= Arima (surname) =

Arima (有馬) is a Japanese surname.

== Families ==
- Hizen-Arima clan, a Japanese family of daimyo
- Murakami-Genji-Arima clan, a Japanese samurai family

== People ==
- Akito Arima (有馬 朗人, 1930–2020), Japanese nuclear physicist
- Arima Yoriyuki (有馬 頼徸, 1714–1783), Japanese mathematician
- Arima Noriyori (有馬 則頼, 1533–1603), Japanese daimyo of Sanda Domain
- Arima Haruzumi (有馬 晴純, 1483–1566), Japanese feudal lord
- Arima Harunobu (有馬 晴信, 1567–1612), Japanese daimyo of Shimabara Domain
- Arima Naozumi (有馬 直純, 1586–1641), Japanese daimyo of Shimabara Domain
- Haruo Arima (有馬 暎夫), Japanese former football player
- Ineko Arima (有馬 稲子, born 1932), Japanese actress
- Kaoru Arima (有馬 馨, 1893–1956), admiral and commander in the Imperial Japanese Navy
- Katsuaki Arima (有馬 克明, born 1969), Japanese voice actor
- Keiichi Arima (有馬 敬一, 1916–1998), Imperial Japanese Navy officer
- Keitarō Arima (有馬 啓太郎, born 1969), Japanese manga artist
- Kenji Arima (有馬 賢二, born 1972), retired Japanese footballer
- Ko Arima (有馬 洪, born 1917), Japanese football player
- Masafumi Arima (有馬 正文, 1895–1944), admiral in the Imperial Japanese Navy
- Stafford Arima, Canadian-born theatre director
- Toshio Arima (有馬 利男, born 1942), President and Representative Director of the Fuji Xerox company
- Yoriyasu Arima (有馬 頼寧, 1884–1957), Japanese politician

== Fictional characters ==
- Soichiro Arima (有馬 総一郎), the male protagonist in the anime and manga series Kare Kano
- Kishou Arima (有馬 貴将), a character from the anime series Tokyo Ghoul
- Kousei Arima (有馬 公生), a character from the anime series Your Lie in April
- Kana Arima, a character from the manga series Oshi no Ko
