= Nossa Senhora da Graça incident =

1610 naval battle between Portugal and Japan

- Part of the Sengoku period and Japanese–Portuguese conflicts
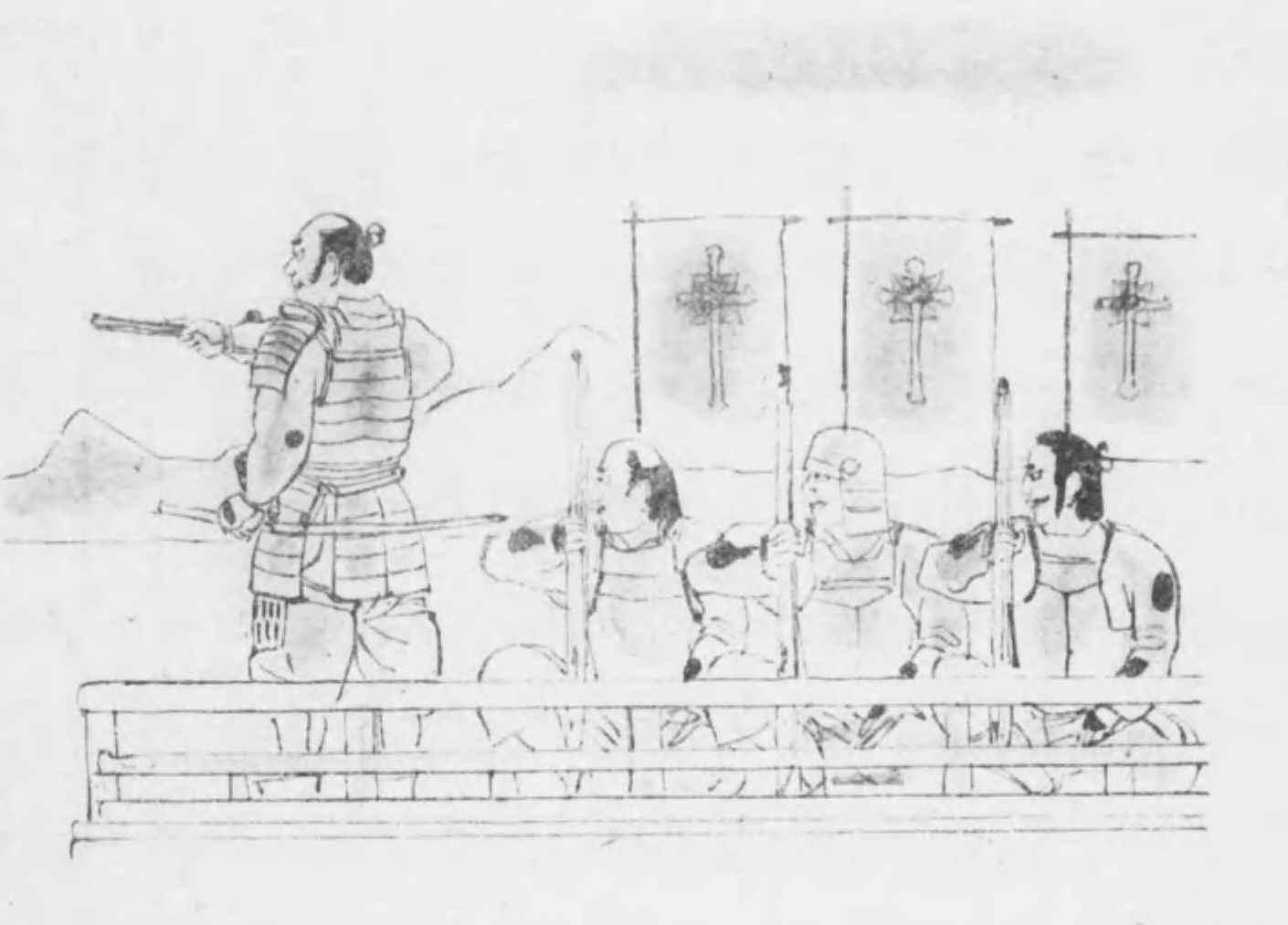
- Illustration from Haruo Satō's Arima Harunobu (1943)
Date	January 3–6, 1610
Location	Nagasaki Bay, Nagasaki, Kyushu
Result	Japanese victory

Belligerents
Tokugawa shogunate; Arima clan	Portugal

Commanders and leaders
Arima Harunobu	André Pessoa ‡‡

Strength
At least 33 vessels carrying around 3000 samurai	1 carrack

Casualties and losses
Several hundred	Jesuits claim under 50; Japanese claim 204 to 300

The Nossa Senhora da Graça incident (ノサ・セニョーラ・ダ・グラサ号事件), alternatively called the Madre de Deus incident (マードレ・デ・デウス号事件), was a four-day naval battle between a Portuguese carrack and Japanese samurai junks belonging to the Arima clan near the waters of Nagasaki in 1610. The richly laden "great ship of commerce", famed as the "black ship" by the Japanese, sank after its captain, André Pessoa, set the gunpowder storage on fire as samurai overran the vessel.

== Background ==
In 1543, Portuguese traders arrived in Japan, initiating its first contact with the West. Soon, they established a trading post in Nagasaki, linking it with their headquarters in Goa via Malacca. Large carracks engaged in the flourishing "Nanban trade", introducing new goods and ideas into Japan, the most important of them being arquebuses and Christianity. Mercantilism consisted in exchanging silver from Japan for silk from China via the Portuguese settlement of Macau on the Chinese coast near Canton, since China banned direct trading with Japan. As Nagasaki grew from a fishing village to a bustling community of Jesuit missionaries and Portuguese traders, its autonomy and religious influence eventually drew the ire of the top powers of Japan. Portuguese control of the settlement was revoked in 1588, and a bugyō (governor) assumed control of Nagasaki in 1605. In addition to the Nagasaki bugyō, local municipal affairs were managed by the daikan (代官; magistrate or lieutenant-governor).

At the same time, the Portuguese near monopoly on East Asian maritime trade was increasingly being contested by new entrants. The Dutch, who had been at war with the Portuguese, made a chance landing in Japan for the first time in 1600 on the Liefde, and the navigator of that ship, the Englishman William Adams, managed to become a key advisor in the shogunal court and therein advocate for Dutch interests. The Spanish, based in the Philippines, also sought a presence in the Japanese trade at the expense of Portugal despite the union of the crowns of Spain and Portugal (the news of which was coolly received in Portuguese Macau). Japan itself toyed with the idea of foreign trade, issuing trading permits to a select list of worthies who would then send off "Red Seal ships" to waters as far as Malacca and the Moluccas.

== Incident in Macau ==
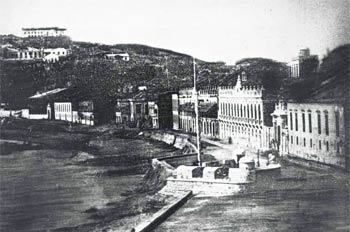
Macau waterfront (1844)

The direct cause of the Nossa Senhora da Graça incident was the waterfront altercation on November 30, 1608, in Macau, resulting in the deaths of 50 Japanese samurai under the orders of André Pessoa, the captain-major of the Portuguese Macau Japan voyage, and is sometimes known as the Red Seal ship incident (マカオの朱印船騒擾事件). Because Macau did not have a permanent governor at the time, Pessoa was the acting governor while he was in the settlement, overriding the Senate of Macau.

In 1608, a red seal ship belonging to the Hinoe daimyō Arima Harunobu weathered in Macau after coming back from Cambodia to fetch a cargo of agarwood, intending to winter there until the monsoon of 1609. The Japanese crew behaved rowdily and walked brazenly through the town in armed bands of thirty or forty. The Chinese inhabitants, greatly concerned by this, urged the Senate of Macau to curb these activities or expel the Japanese altogether. The Senate merely advised the Japanese to moderate their behavior and disguise themselves as Chinese, but this was flatly ignored.

Since appeasement only appeared to encourage the Japanese crew, whom their compatriots joined from a nearby shipwreck, the Portuguese authorities hardened their stance in response, lest the Japanese try to take over Macau. On November 30, the Japanese gang got into a serious brawl. When the Portuguese ouvidor (magistrate) arrived and attempted to stop the fight, he was injured and his retainers killed. Church bells were sounded in alarm following this incident, and Captain-major André Pessoa arrived at the scene with all available armed reinforcements. The Japanese fled and took refuge in two houses, which Portuguese soldiers quickly surrounded. Pessoa offered quarter to those who would surrender, but 27 of those in the first house refused and were gunned down when forced out of the house by fire. The Jesuits and the Bishop of Macau intervened as Pessoa prepared to storm the second house, and the Japanese there, numbering around 50, were induced to surrender on the promise of life and freedom. However, Pessoa had the suspected ringleaders strangled in jail, while the rest were allowed to leave Macau after signing an affidavit absolving the Portuguese from all blame.

Estimates of the Japanese casualties vary, with reports indicating between 27 and 50. The defeated and humiliated Japanese weighed anchor and headed back to Nagasaki.

== The Japan voyage of 1609 ==
Due to Dutch activities in Cantonese waters in 1607 and 1608, no Portuguese ship left for the Japan voyage for over two years. Hence, the 1609 Macau carrack was unusually richly stocked with two years' supply for the Japanese market. This carrack, variously called the Nossa Senhora da Graça (Our Lady of Grace) or the Madre de Deus (Mother of God), left Macau on May 10, six weeks ahead of schedule, because its captain, André Pessoa, heard from Malacca that the Dutch were planning to attack his ship.

It was the Dutch modus operandi at the time to intercept the annual Portuguese trading fleet, especially since their capture of the Santa Catarina in 1603 had been so profitable its booty sold for more than half of the original capital of the Dutch East India Company (VOC). When the admiral of the Dutch fleet in the East learned that the Portuguese were loading an exceptionally rich carrack in Macau, he sent orders to Abraham van den Broeck, in command of two Dutch vessels in the waters of Johor, to find this ship. If they missed the carrack, the Dutch would proceed to Japan and try to open trade there. Van den Broeck, with Jacques Specx in tow, set sail on May 10, stopping by Patani to get a supply of some silk, pepper, and lead to trade in Japan. They then laid around the Taiwan Strait in wait for the Portuguese carrack to no avail, then made their way into the Japanese harbor of Hirado on July 1. As it happened, the Dutch only missed the Nossa Senhora da Graça by two days since Pessoa sailed right into a monsoon that carried the carrack way to the south, offsetting his early lead, and landed in the harbor of Nagasaki on June 29.

== Intrigues in Japan ==
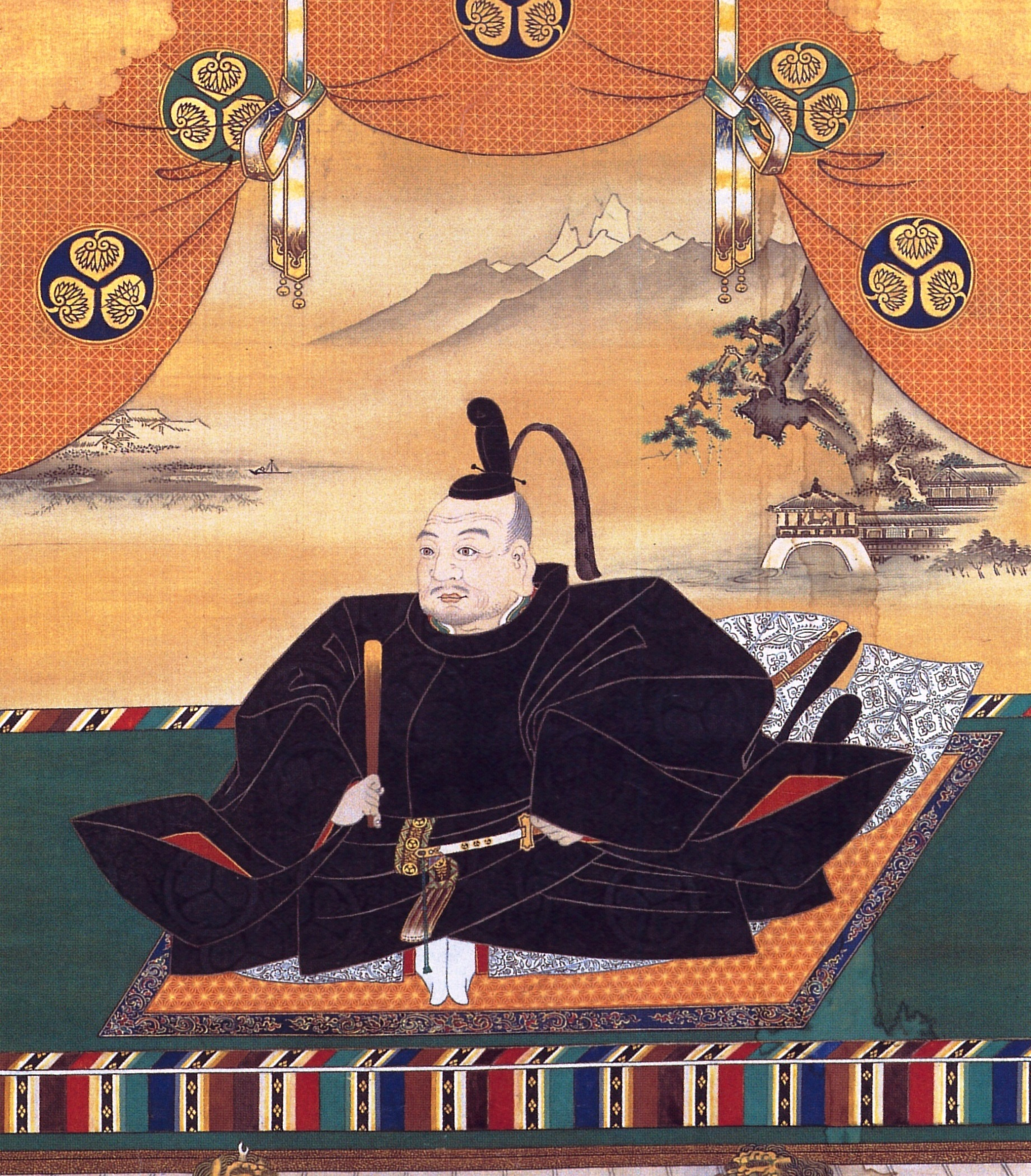
Tokugawa Ieyasu

In Nagasaki, the bugyō Hasegawa Fujihiro (長谷川藤広) gave Pessoa more trouble than was usual for Europeans in Japan at the time. Hasegawa repeatedly tried to inspect the ship's contents, but Pessoa always rejected it, and Hasegawa temporarily relented. When all the merchants and merchandise were unloaded, Hasegawa paid the Portuguese scant courtesy and bought all the best silk at low fixed prices, ostensibly on behalf of the retired shogun Tokugawa Ieyasu. For reasons not entirely clear, Hasegawa and his colleague, the daikan Murayama Tōan, showed hostility to the Portuguese traders at this time, whereas previous relations had been amicable. Their behavior may have been motivated by jealousy against the influential Jesuit father João Rodrigues at Ieyasu's side, desire for a larger share of the Portuguese trade, or merely be a reflection of Ieyasu's increasing impatience with the Portuguese. Hasegawa and Murayama complained to Ieyasu of Portuguese insolence, pointing out that they acted with virtual extraterritoriality in Nagasaki and accusing them of hiding the best silk to sell in the black market for higher prices. They added that if Ieyasu adopted a harder line against the Portuguese, the red seal ships could compensate for some potential losses in the Portuguese trade. Faced with the Dutch establishment of trade at Hirado, Pessoa reconciled with Hasegawa and Murayama through the intercession of the Jesuits and a monetary bribe.

When Pessoa explained his version of events of the Macau incident to Hasegawa and suggested forwarding the affidavit to Ieyasu (who was retired but still in charge), Hasegawa advised Pessoa to do nothing of the sort. Hasegawa explained that while Ieyasu was mindful of the truculent behaviors of the Japanese abroad, he would be forced to take his compatriots's side as a matter of principle if the issue was brought up officially. This argument did not entirely convince Pessoa, and he drew up an unofficial memorandum of the Portuguese case for Honda Masazumi, Ieyasu's handler of foreign affairs, much to the displeasure of Hasegawa and Murayama, who wrongly suspected that Pessoa had also complained about the two in the memorandum. In any case, Honda, with authorization from Ieyasu, gave Pessoa's envoy written assurances that Japanese sailors would be forbidden to travel to Macau, and any who did could be handled according to Portuguese laws.

Outwardly, Hasegawa still put Portuguese interests in mind as it was in his best interests to keep the Portuguese trade alive in Nagasaki. He arranged to have the Portuguese envoys arrive in Ieyasu's court at Sunpu before those of the Dutch trading party, even though Ieyasu chose to grant an audience to the Dutch envoys first. The Dutch entry provided Ieyasu an opportunity to break the Portuguese monopoly on Chinese silk, and the delighted ex-shōgun gave the Dutch permission to establish a trading post anywhere in Japan without the restriction on prices like the Portuguese had. Hasegawa took the Portuguese side and relayed information of Dutch activities to the Portuguese; however, Pessoa and the Macanese merchants were still suspicious of Hasegawa's intentions and resolved to petition Ieyasu directly to complain about Hasegawa and Murayama. The Jesuits were horrified when they found out about Pessoa's decision due to their knowledge that Hasegawa's sister Onatsu (お夏) was a favorite concubine of Ieyasu, "so much so, that if she said black was white, [Ieyasu] would believe it". The fathers used all sorts of rhetoric they could muster, including the threat of excommunication, to dissuade Pessoa from complaining. Pessoa desisted, but the damage had already been done since the Japanese interpreter hired to translate the list of grievances showed it to the bugyō himself. Hasegawa, in great anger, swore to get even with Pessoa dead or alive.

In September 1609, the Japanese survivors of the Macau affair of 1608 returned to tell their version of events to their lord, Arima Harunobu, and the news was reported to Ieyasu. The ex-shogun reprimanded Hasegawa for trying to hide the matter and ordered him to make a full investigation. Hasegawa drew up a lengthy report taking the side of Arima, who wanted revenge for his men, saying the Portuguese had obtained the Macau affidavits under duress and should be considered void. Hasegawa and Arima advocated for the forcible takeover of the Nossa Senhora da Graça and its cargo. Still, Ieyasu was hesitant since such a move could endanger the annual Nagasaki-Macau trade. The Jesuit father Francesco Pasio alleges that the final push Ieyasu needed came when a Spanish ship sailing from Manila to Mexico was wrecked off the coast of eastern Japan in the same month. When Ieyasu received the Spanish survivors in his court at Sunpu, he asked their leader Rodrigo de Vivero y Aberrucia, the newly replaced governor of the Philippines, if the Spaniards could supply the bulk of silk imports to Japan like the Portuguese. Aberrucia rashly replied that they could easily send three ships to Japan yearly. Ieyasu, now convinced that he could replace the Portuguese merchants with the Spaniards, the Dutch, and his red seal ships, ordered Hasegawa and Arima to arrest Pessoa at all costs.

== The battle for the black ship ==
=== Preparations and actions of the first night ===
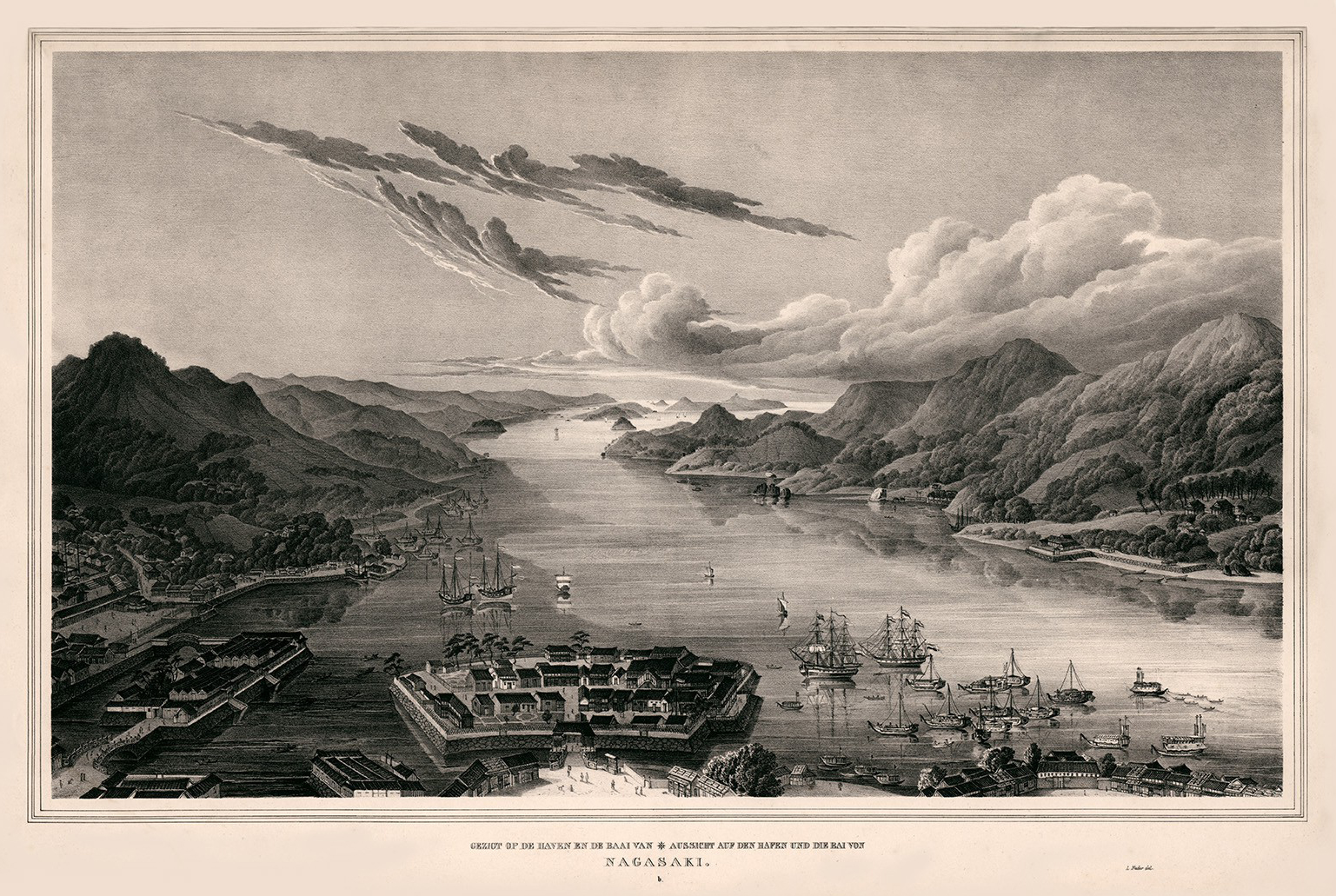
Nagasaki Bay (1897)

Through the Christian community in Japan, Pessoa was informed of the intrigues against him and promptly prepared for defense and departure. He prepared a large number of hand grenades and ammunition aboard the ship. Still, due to the large size of the cargo, the ship was not ready to sail until after New Year's Day in 1610, whereas previous Macanese vessels usually returned before Christmas. While the ship was being loaded, Arima tried to entice Pessoa to come ashore with offers of hospitality, saying that he had been sent to Nagasaki only to negotiate silk prices, and that the high officials in Sunpu only wanted Pessoa to give his account of the Macau events in person—he would be pardoned as a foreigner even if he was found guilty. Many Portuguese believed Arima, but not Pessoa, who knew Arima had assembled a force of 1200 samurai against him. Pessoa now would not go ashore even for mass and ordered his crew to come aboard the carrack to set sail. However, this was delayed as some crew believed that the current crisis was merely Pessoa's feud and dragged their feet, while Japanese guards obstructed most who had wanted to embark. By the time Arima attacked the carrack on January 3, only about 40 Portuguese were on board.

Before they struck, Arima, Hasegawa, and Murayama jointly sent a message to the Jesuits justifying their impending attack on the carrack with the fact that Pessoa was trying to escape Japanese justice. They followed with another message suggesting that if the Portuguese crew would give up their captain, the matter would be settled. The Jesuits responded that surrendering their captains was not in Portuguese culture.

At night, Arima's armada of junks full of shouting men approached the Nossa Senhora da Graça unlit and quiet in stark contrast. Some of Pessoa's officers wanted to fire on the mob, being lit by the torches they carried. Still, Pessoa refused to take responsibility for opening hostilities, so the procedures of setting sail and weighing anchor continued quietly in the darkness. The Japanese shot first, firing two volleys of muskets and arrows, and Pessoa responded with two successive broadsides of five guns apiece, with flutes and trumpets playing after each volley to add insult to injury. The Japanese flotilla scattered and retreated for the night as the Portuguese carrack anchored off Fukahori (深堀) for lack of wind.

Hasegawa assumed the battle was lost and sent a courier to Sunpu carrying the news. Ieyasu received the news in great rage and ordered all Portuguese in Nagasaki to be executed, including Jesuit missionaries. This order was never carried out, as the courier returned to Nagasaki to find the situation significantly changed.

=== The second and third days ===
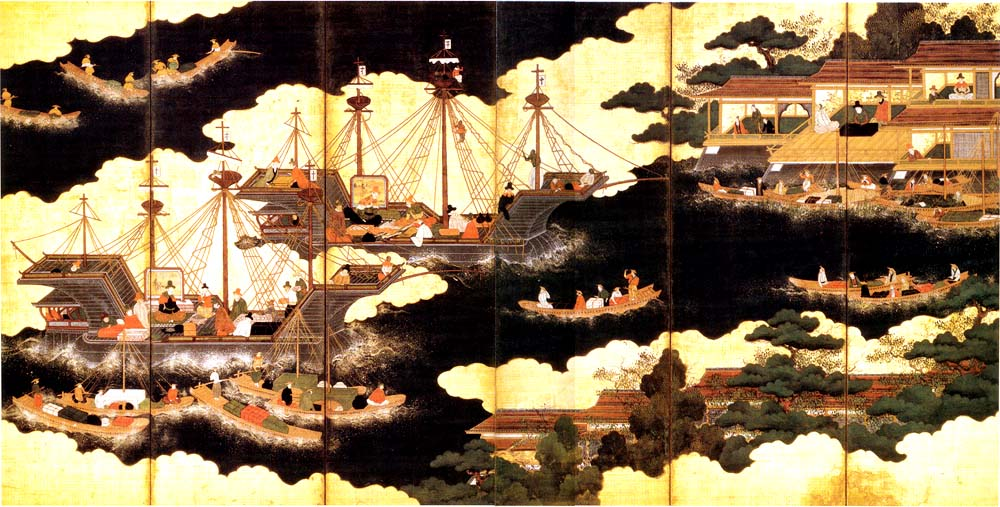
Japanese rafts and Portuguese carracks

The battle continued with minor variations for the next two nights, with half-hearted parleys carried out in the daytime since the Japanese did not dare to attack during the day. In addition to repeating the first night's manoeuvers, Arima tried various methods to subdue the ship. First, he tried sending two samurai to board the ship in disguise and kill Pessoa on deck, but this failed as the two were not allowed onto the ship. He then sent divers to cut the cables of the ship's anchor, but this was also unsuccessful. On the third night, Arima sent forth a flotilla of fire ships, but they all drifted off in the wind save one, which slammed into the bow cable of the carrack but was cleared without much difficulty.

During the third day, Arima sent a message to Pessoa that he wished to renew negotiations about the silk prices and was willing to send hostages aboard to prove his sincerity, provided that the carrack stayed where it was. Pessoa, in return, demanded the sons of both Arima Harunobu and Murayama Toan and that he be allowed to take the ship to the neighboring anchorage of Fukuda, where he could wait for favorable winds to go back to Macau. Arima gave no reply, but Hasegawa was furious when he heard about the exchange, telling Pessoa in a message that Arima had no authority to make such a proposal and, on the contrary, had direct orders to kill Pessoa. Hasegawa added that if Pessoa surrendered himself and let the cargo be sold at a price decided by the Japanese, he could intercede on Pessoa's behalf. Pessoa politely declined further negotiations as long as the Japanese continued hostilities.

=== The final night ===
On the morning of January 6, 1610, a favorable breeze made it possible for Pessoa to move his ship to an inlet near Fukuda, but no further. Seeing that his prey was about to get away, Arima gave chase in a flotilla led by a colossal tower-junk. This junk was built by lashing two large boats together, upon which a wooden siege tower as tall as the carrack's deck was erected. The tower was covered with wet hides to protect it against Portuguese fire and had openings for the 500 archers and musketeers inside to shoot out of. With the attacking force having swelled to around 3000 samurai due to reinforcements in the prior three days, the flotilla tried to approach the carrack under the cover of the tower-junk.

Between 8 and 9 p.m., the flotilla closed in at the carrack's stern, where only one of the two chase guns could be used to fend off the attack since the other had been moved to the prow to protect the ship's cables. A Japanese Christian captain led the charge, rallying his fellow coreligionists with the reasoning that if the carrack were not destroyed or captured, Ieyasu would turn his wrath onto the Christian community, and the churches would be destroyed. A few Japanese succeeded in boarding the ship but were promptly cut down (Pessoa himself killed two) or were forced to jump into the water.

The Portuguese fended off the smaller crafts with hand grenades, but they made little effect on the floating tower, which grappled the poop deck. Up to this point, the Portuguese casualties had been few, with only four or five Portuguese along with a few lascars killed, while the Japanese dead were estimated at several hundred. However, six hours into the fighting, a shot from the tower-junk hit a fire pot that a Portuguese soldier was about to throw, smashing it onto the gunpowder at his feet. This started a conflagration that spread through the deck, setting the mizzen sail ablaze. Pessoa and his men retreated to the forecastle, where they realized they did not have enough men to fight the fire and the Japanese boarders simultaneously. At this point, Pessoa ordered the ship's magazine to be set on fire since he would rather die than surrender. When the ship's purser hesitated, Pessoa cast away his sword and shield and picked up a crucifix, and then he exclaimed: "Blessed be thou, oh Lord, since thou willest that all this should end!" He then told his crew to save themselves as he started the fire. The Nossa Senhora da Graça blew up in two successive explosions, split into two, and sank with cargo, crew, and boarders alike. The Japanese killed all they could see swimming in the water, but a few survivors safely made it onto the shore. André Pessoa's body, however, was never found.

== Aftermath ==
The remaining Portuguese merchants and missionaries were naturally concerned about their fates, especially since Ieyasu had personally ordered their execution. Arima, a Christian, apparently regretted what he had done and interceded on the Jesuits' behalf. Ieyasu had a change of heart since he was convinced that foreign trade would cease without the missionaries. Eventually, the merchants were allowed to leave for Macau with their property while the missionaries could stay. (With the notable exception of Ieyasu's Jesuit translator João Rodrigues, who was replaced by William Adams.) In March 1610, Hasegawa told the leaving merchants to "not cut the thread of trade, but arrange for at least a small vessel to come this year, and the Great Ship the next, when all would be well."

Since the Portuguese settlement of Macau greatly depended on the Japanese trade, the Senate of Macau decided it was prudent to send an envoy to Japan to officially negotiate the resumption of trade. They could not send a ship to Japan until the summer of 1611 when an embassy led by Dom Nuno Soutomaior reached the court of Ieyasu in August. By this time, Ieyasu was quite disillusioned about his previous hopes of having the Dutch and Spaniards replace the Portuguese traders, since the Dutch could not come in 1610, as their ships intended for Japan were caught in François de Wittert's defeat in the First Battle of Playa Honda by Spain, and Spain's contribution to the Japan trade in March 1611 was found to be disappointing. In addition, contrary to Hasegawa's previous assurances to Ieyasu, silk imports from red seal ships could not compare with those from the "great ship of commerce" since the Portuguese enjoyed near-exclusive direct access to the Canton silk market due to the Chinese ban on Japanese trade. Therefore, both sides were eager to resume the annual Japan trade.

Soutomaior had first justified Portuguese suppression of the incident in Macau, then demanded from the shogunate compensation for all damages caused by the sinking of Nossa Senhora da Graça and the dismissal of Hasegawa, but the latter demands were rejected. Finally, blame for the incident was placed squarely on the dead André Pessoa for refusing to surrender when asked. Ieyasu permitted the "great ship" to come to Nagasaki as before. After another trip to the court of Ieyasu in 1612 to clear up the terms of trade, the São Felipe e Santiago became the first Portuguese carrack to trade in Nagasaki after the two-year hiatus.

Nevertheless, Pessoa's resistance ultimately harmed Portuguese trade and missionary activities since it reaffirmed that the Portuguese were a troublesome people in the eyes of the Tokugawa shogunate. The Nossa Senhora da Graça incident made Ieyasu and his successors move away from their earlier toleration of the Portuguese in favor of the Dutch. In 1639, the Portuguese were expelled from Japan and the Dutch were segregated to the artificial island of Dejima, during the shogunate's enforcement of their isolationist sakoku policy.

For Arima's part in sinking the Nossa Senhora da Graça, Ieyasu not only rewarded Arima Harunobu with a prized sword but also presented his granddaughter Kunihime (国姫) as a wife for Harunobu's son Naozumi. Harunobu felt that his efforts during the Nossa Senhora da Graça incident warranted further rewards – namely the return of territory in Hizen that was taken from the Arima during the Sengoku period. To this end, Harunobu approached and bribed Okamoto Daihachi, a Christian aide to Honda Masazumi. This led to the Okamoto Daihachi incident, in which the corruption case was discovered and caused Harunobu to be exiled in 1612 and executed the following year.

== Salvage ==
When the Nossa Senhora da Graça sank, its cargo mainly consisted of about 3000 piculs of unsold Chinese silk and 160 crates of silver bullion; altogether, the total loss was estimated at more than a million in gold. Recovery efforts have persisted from the night of the sinking—when 200 floating baskets of silk were picked up with grappling hooks—right down to modern times, but most of the treasure caches have yet to be found. These efforts centered around the area where the carrack was recorded to have sunk, 35 fathoms (64 m) under the sea off the island of Koyagi, Nagasaki.

Of the 150 or 160 crates of silver on board the vessel, 70 were retrieved by a merchant of Hirado in 1617. Later salvage efforts only turned up three bars of silver, a few trinkets in 1653, and a cannon and some silver in 1658. Modern attempts from 1928 to 1933 found another cannon (now placed at the front door of the Tenri Central Library in Nara), two iron helmets, an anchor, some oyster-shell window panes, and an astrolabe, among other artifacts. A suspected wreck of the Nossa Senhora da Graça was discovered by the local carpenter and amateur underwater archaeologist Matsumoto Shizuo from 1987 to 2000, 600 m from Fukuda and 45 m underwater. Matsumoto erected a life-sized Virgin Mary statue on the nearest island of Matsushima (松島) to commemorate the occasion.

== Legacy ==
The British historian C. R. Boxer noted the significant effect that Pessoa's actions had on how the Japanese see Portuguese people. According to Boxer, the event gave the Japanese an exaggerated impression of the Portuguese's fighting qualities and appealed to the Japanese samurai mentality due to Pessoa's rather un-Christian suicide. As such, stories of the event were told and retold again over the next hundred years, often in an exaggerated and wildly inaccurate manner, and found themselves embedded as part of local folklore.

A direct reference to the event can be found in 1808, during Japan's period of self-imposed isolation, when the Royal Navy frigate HMS Phaeton entered Nagasaki harbor to ambush two Dutch merchant vessels that were expected to arrive in an offshoot of the Napoleonic Wars. The Nagasaki bugyō, somewhat inaccurately, threatened to sink the foreign warship "as the Madre de Deus had been burned and sunk some two hundred years before".

== See also ==
- Siege of Moji (1561) – the Portuguese carrack joined a Japanese battle in what became the first European naval bombardment on Japanese soil.
- Battle of Fukuda Bay (1565) – A Japanese flotilla attacks a Portuguese carrack and fails to capture it in the first naval clash between Japan and the West.
- Battle of Manila (1574) – A Chinese and Japanese pirate fleet attacked Manila intending to capture the city
- Battle of Cagayan (1582) – Battle between Wokou pirates and a Spanish flotilla.
- Second attack on Kamishi (August 9, 1945) – last-ever direct naval bombardment of the Japanese home islands in World War II.
