= Arima (disambiguation) =

Arima may refer to:

== Places ==
- Arima, a borough and town in eastern Trinidad, Trinidad and Tobago.
- Arima (Cilicia), a town of ancient Cilicia, now in Turkey
- Arima, Syria, a village in the Aleppo Governorate in Syria
- Arima, Tartus Governorate, a medieval fortress and village in the Tartus Governorate in Syria
- Arima Onsen, a hot springs resort area in Kobe, Japan
- Arima, a place where, according to Hesiod, Echidna dwells

== People ==
- Hizen-Arima clan, a Japanese family of daimyo
- Arima (surname), a Japanese surname

== Acronym ==
- ARIMA, autoregressive integrated moving average, model in statistics

== Others ==
- Arima (parliamentary constituency), an electoral district in Trinidad
- Arima (beetle), a genus of leaf beetles (subfamily Galerucinae)
- Arima, a synonym for the moth genus Spargania
- Arima Kinen, horse race in Japan

== See also ==
- Arimaa, a board game invented by Omar Syed
