= Hinoe Castle =

Castle in Minamishimabara, Japan

Coordinates: 32°39′36.04″N 130°15′9.97″E

- 日野江城
- Minamishimabara, Nagasaki Japan
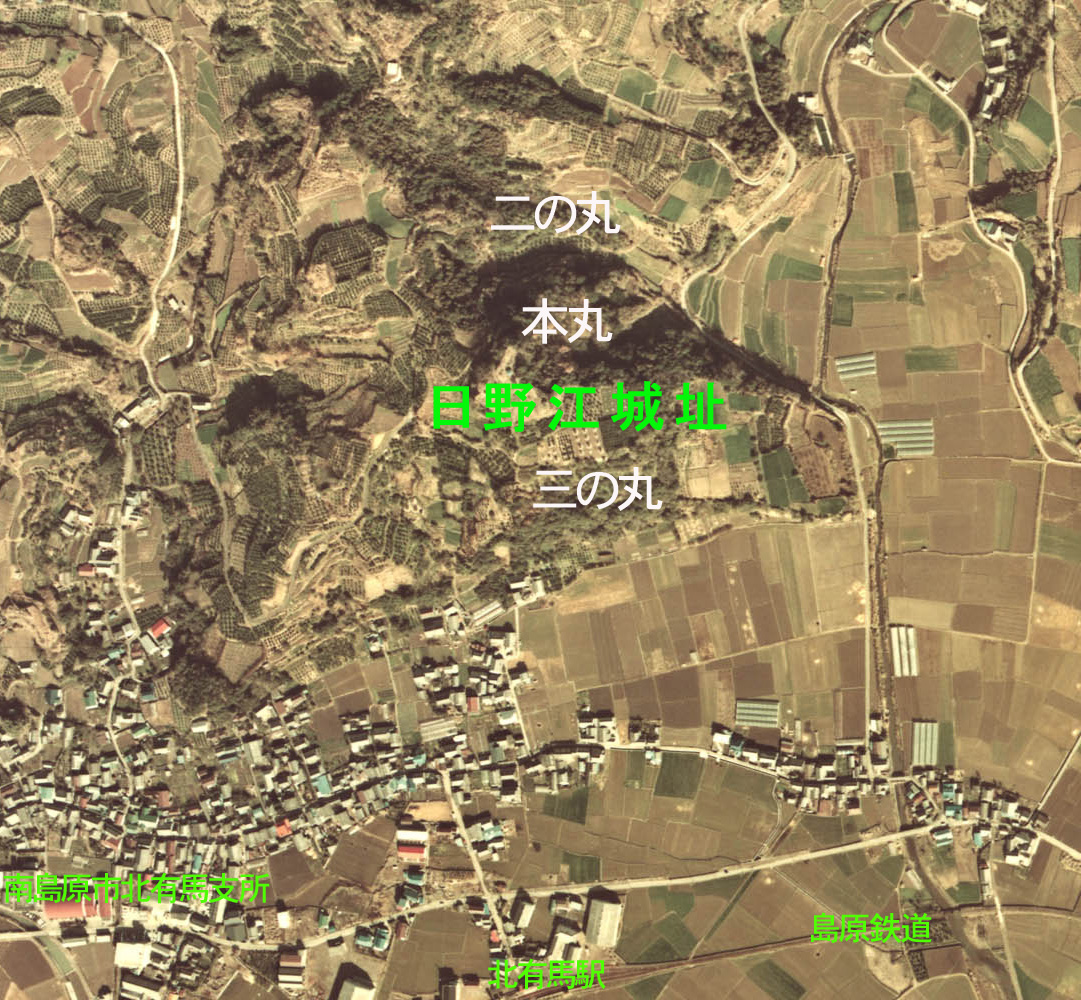
- Aerial view

Site information
- Type: hirayama-style Japanese castle
- Controlled by: Arima clan
- Open to the public: yes
- Condition: Archaeological and designated national historical site; castle ruins

Location

Site history
- Built: 1213 -1219
- In use: Sengoku period
- National Historic Site of Japan

The Hinoe Castle (日野江城, Hinoe-jō) was a Sengoku period Japanese castle cemetery located in the Kita-Arima neighbourhood of city of Minamishimabara, Nagasaki Prefecture Japan. Its ruins were designated a National Historic Site of Japan in 1972.

== Overview ==
Hinoe Castle is located on a hill near the mouth of the Arima River, almost in the urban center of Minamishimabara. The site is at the tip of long ridge continued southward from Mount Unzen, at the south coast of the Shimabara Peninsula. The Arima River flows to the south, and the Ote River flows to the east. The existing castle is a mountain castle from the Sengoku period, with many enclosures arranged in a stepped pattern around the main citadel. The main body of Hinoe Castle extended over an area 400 by 200 meters, separated from connecting ridge by valley. The core area of the castle was the eastern half, and consisted of the central enclosure at highest point on the hill, the secondary enclosure to southeast and the third enclosure to the west. Another peak at western half of the hill was used as a frontal fortification protecting the castle from the castle town, and numerous terraces were also built surrounding these areas. The main gate is presumed to be on the east side, and the remains of a staircase stretching over 100 meters that reaches all the way to the bottom of the main enclosure.

A castle was built on this site by Fujiwara Tsunezumi, who ruled parts of the Shimabara Peninsula during the early Kamakura period. Tsunezumi claimed descendant from Fujiwara no Sumitomo (although he also claimed descent from the Taira clan or the Northern Fujiwara clan as circumstances warranted), and at the time of the castle's construction, he took the surname Arima. By the Sengoku period, the Arima clan had conquered the various powers within Shimabara Peninsula. Arima Takazumi built Hara Castle as a subsidiary castle to Hinoe Castle and during his rule, the Arima clan's territory reached its largest, growing to 210,000 koku and controlling most of Hizen Province. The Arima earned enormous profit from marine transportation, and in 1550 the Portuguese began to trade at Kuchinotsu port next to Hinoe Castle. However, when the Ōuchi clan, which had been their backer, was destroyed, the Arima came under pressure from the Ryūzōji clan. The 13th head of the clan, Arima Harunobu, converted to Christianity and expanded Hinoe Castle to include a seminary, destroying Buddhist temples and Shinto shrines to use as building materials. After the 1600 Battle of Sekigahara, he was reduced to 40,000 koku, but survived as daimyō of Shimabara Domain under the Tokugawa shogunate. Hinoe Castle became the headquarters of the Shimabara Domain. However, in 1612, he was ordered to commit seppuku for his involvement in the Okamoto Daihachi incident. His eldest son, Arima Naozumi, became his successor, but in 1614, he was transferred to Nobeoka Domain in Hyūga Province. The castle was controlled directly by the shogunate until the arrival of Matsukura Shigemasa in 1616. He found the castle inconvenient, so he built Shimabara Castle (cannibalising some buildings and parts of the stone walls of Hinoe Castle) to which he relocated his seat. Hinoe Castle was allowed to fall into ruins, and after the Shimabara rebellion, what remained was demolished to prevent any further use. Much of the area of the castle disappeared under orchards and farms.

Archaeological excavations were carried out from 1995 to 2000. During these excavations, a straight staircase similar to one found in Azuchi Castle, stonework incorporating foreign technology, Chinese ceramics, and roof tiles with gold leaf were unearthed. These findings suggest that the castle was advanced for its time and had close ties with the Toyotomi government. The castle was nominated as one of the components in the UNESCO World Heritage Site Hidden Christian Sites in the Nagasaki Region; however, it was removed from the candidate listing when the International Council on Monuments and Sites, an advisory body to UNESCO, pointed out that the castle had little connection to the period when Christianity was prohibited in Japan.

The remains of the staircase were subsequent backfilled for preservation, and it cannot be seen at present. Remnants of stone walls and dry moats can still be seen on site. The castle ruins are located about 24 kilometers southwest of Shimabarakō Station on the Shimabara Railway Line.

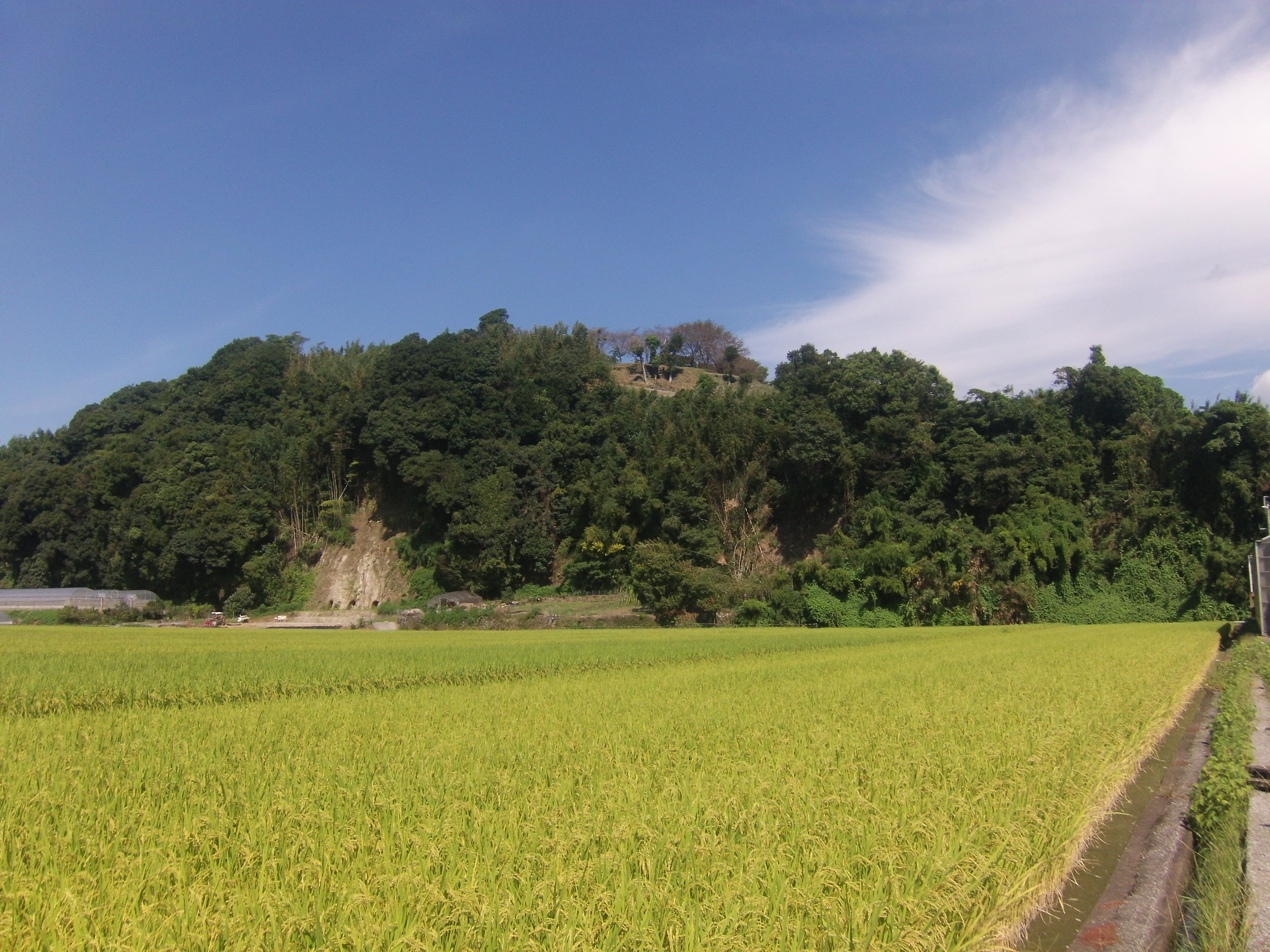
View of the exterior, showing how the natural mountain was utilized

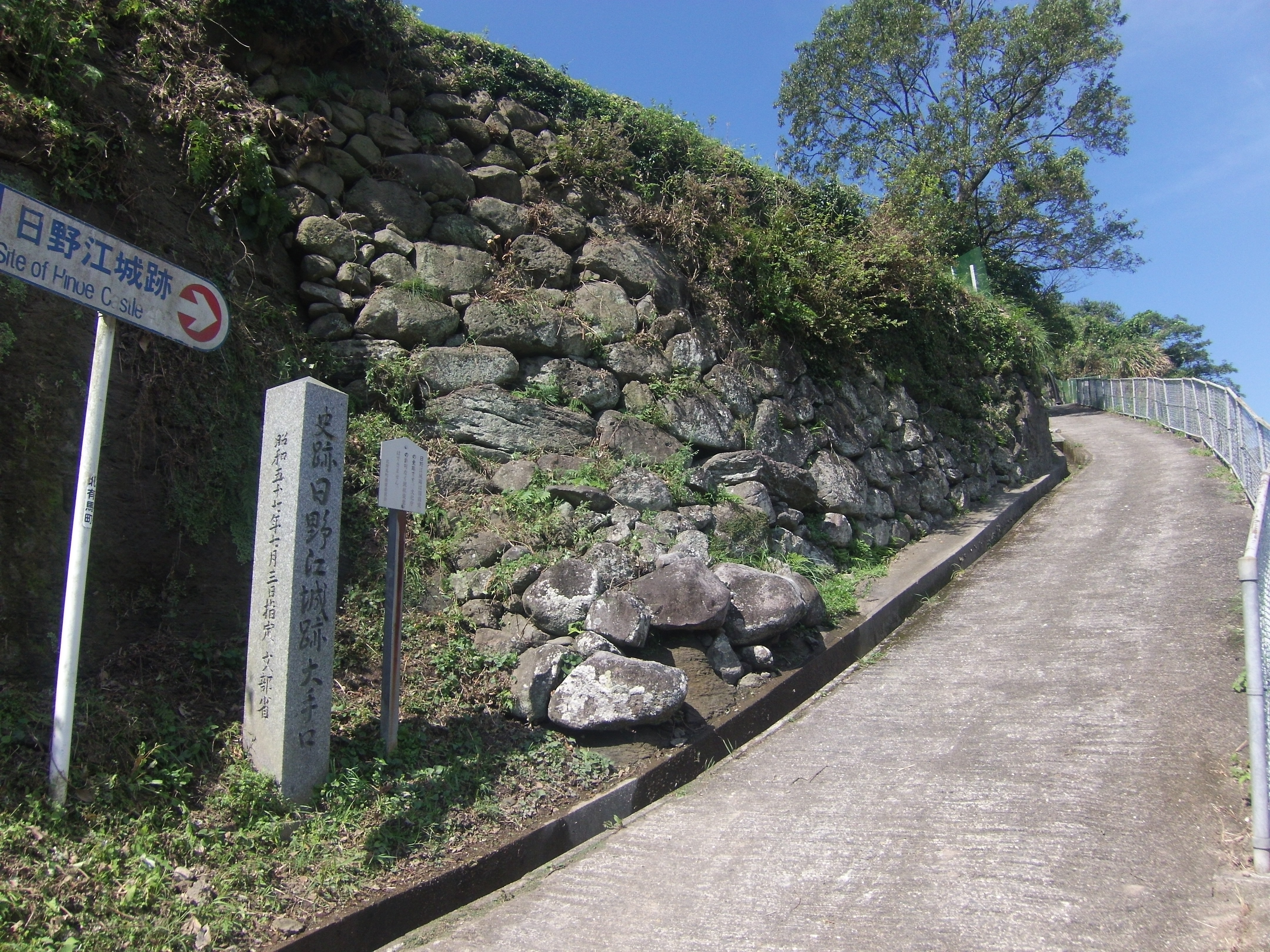
Site of the Otemon main gate

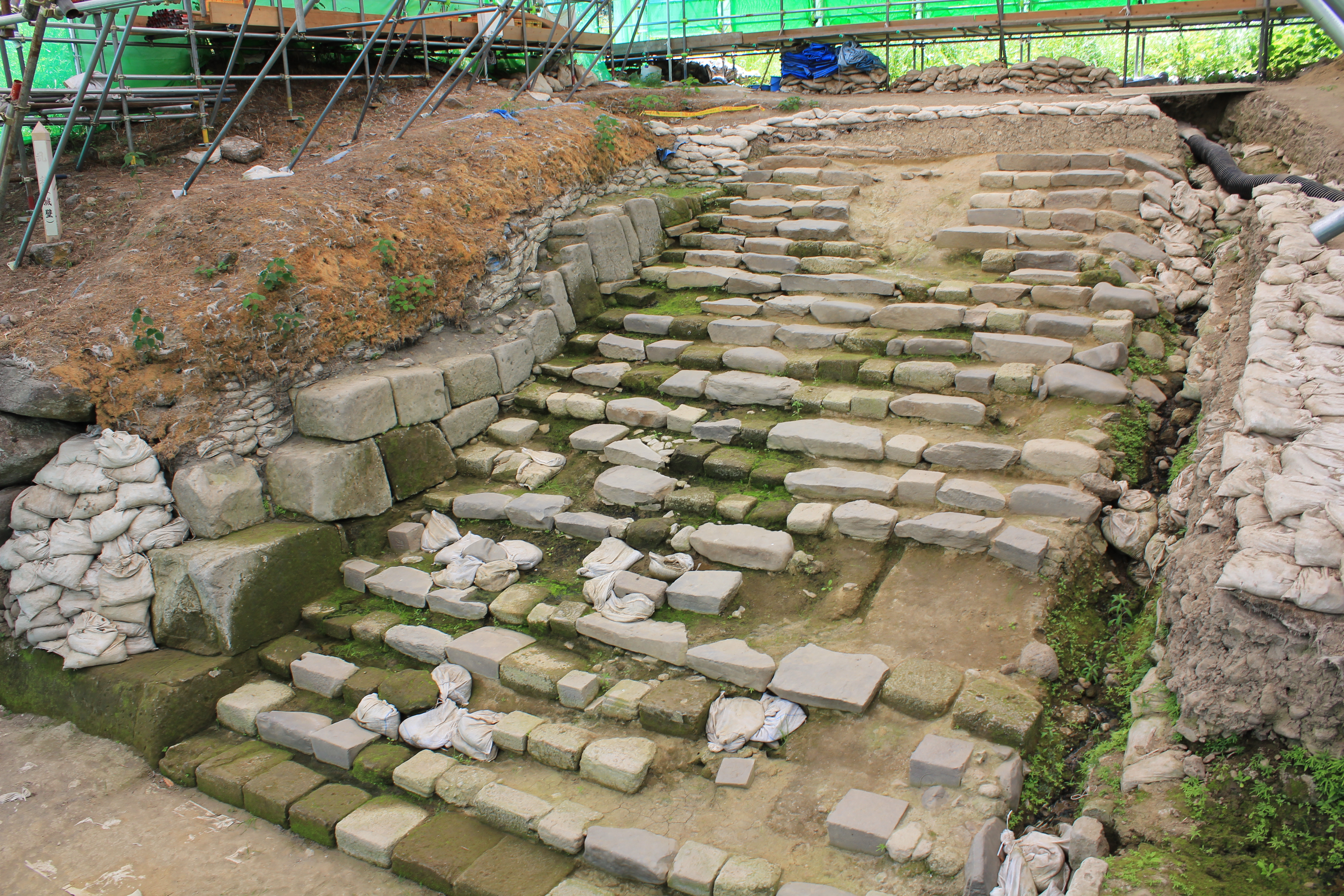
Remnants of stone staircase

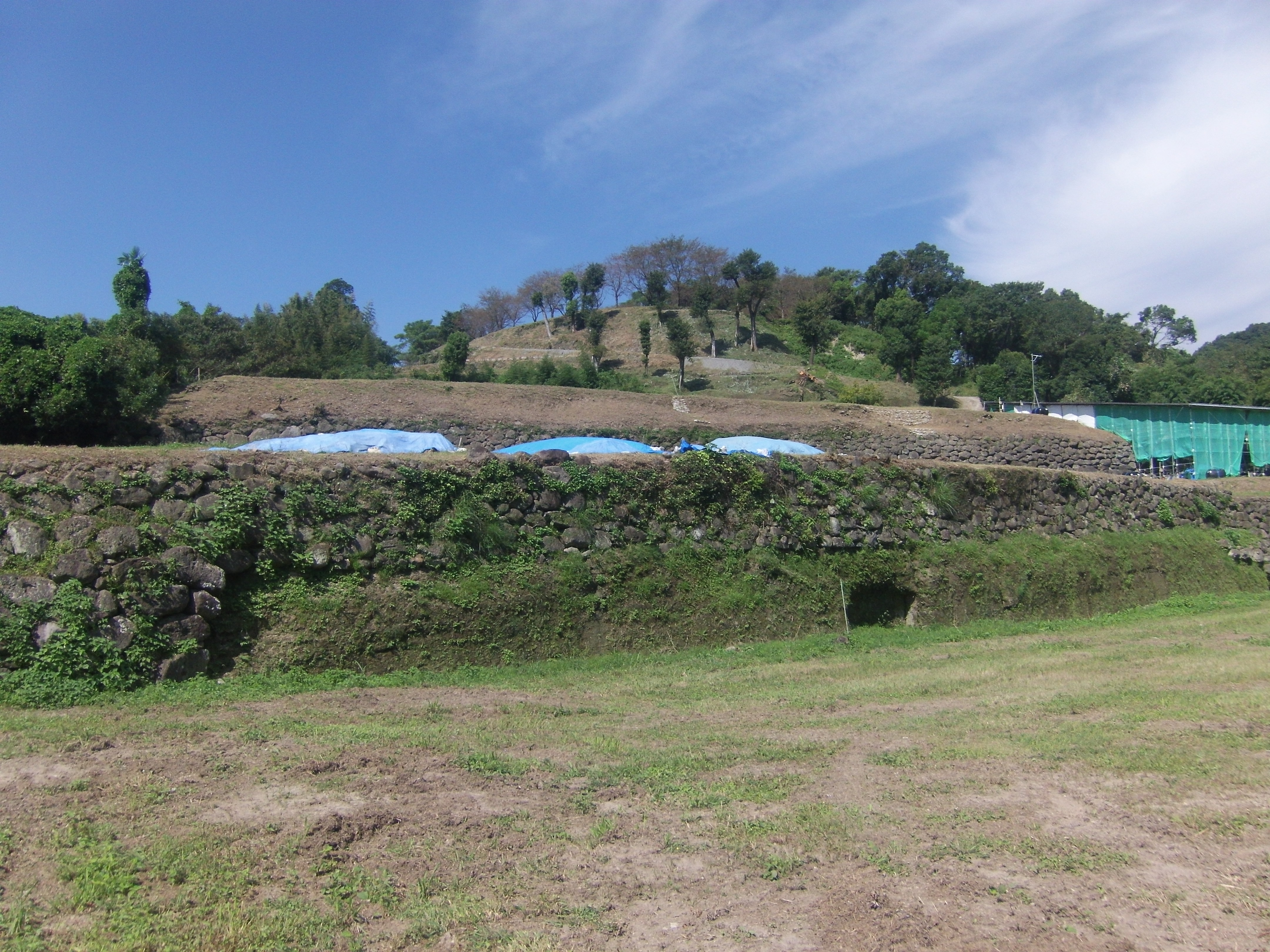
The stone walls are built on natural bedrock.

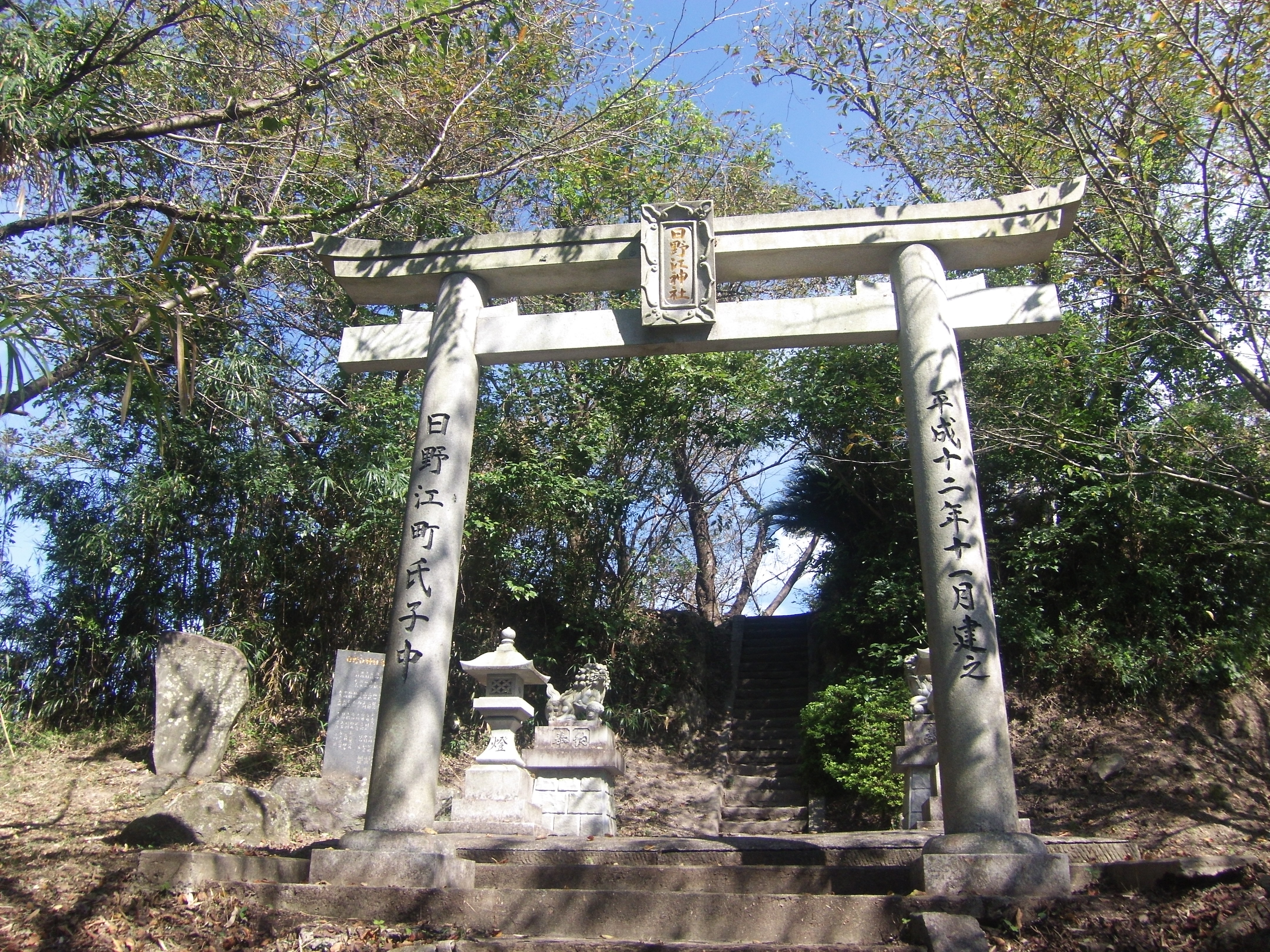
Hinoe Jinja located on the site of the tenshu

== See also ==
- List of Historic Sites of Japan (Nagasaki)
