= Arima Yoshisada =

Japanese Daimyo from Hizen

- 有馬 義貞

Arima clan head
- Preceded by: Arima Haruzumi
- Succeeded by: Arima Harunobu

Personal details
- Born: Yoshinao; Daiei 1 (1521) Hizen, Ashikaga, Japan
- Died: Tensho 5 (15 January 1577)
- Parent(s): Arima Haruzumi (father), Ōmura Sumitomo daughter's (mother)
- Relatives: Ōmura Sumitada, Naokazu Chijiwa, Mori Matsuura, Sutra Shiki (siblings)
- Occupation: Tycoon
- Known for: Leader of Arima clan
- Nickname: Don Andres (spiritual)

Arima Yoshisada (Japanese: 有馬義貞) (1521-1576) was a Japanese daimyo from Hizen. He lived during the Sengoku period. He was the son and successor of Arima Haruzumi and the father of Kirishitan daimyo Arima Harunobu. He was the 12th head of the Arima clan.

In 1563, Yoshisada formed a partnership with the Portuguese and the Jesuits due to the goods they brought to the domain. In 1576, Yoshisada converted to Christianity, along with some of his subjects. He was given the baptismal name Don Andre.

== See also ==
- Arima Harunobu
- Catholic Church in Japan
- Arima clan
