= Tadachika =

- Gender: Male

Origin
- Origin: Japanese
- Meaning: Different meanings depending on the kanji used

Tadachika (written: 忠周, 忠隣 or 忠親) is a masculine Japanese given name. Notable people with the name include:

- Matsudaira Tadachika (松平 忠周; 1661–1728), Japanese daimyō
- Nakayama Tadachika (中山 忠親; 1131–1195), Japanese noble and writer
- Ōkubo Tadachika (大久保 忠隣; 1553–1628), Japanese daimyō
