= Corycium Antrum =

Inland town of ancient Cilicia

Coordinates: 36°27′06″N 34°06′17″E

Corycium Antrum was an inland town of ancient Cilicia, above Arima, inhabited during the Byzantine era.

Its site is tentatively located near Cennet Obruğu in Asiatic Turkey.
