= Matsudaira Tadakazu =

Matsudaira Tadakazu 松平 忠和
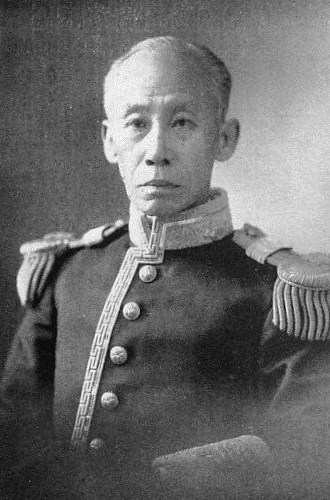
- Portrait of Matsudaira

8th Lord of Shimabara
- In office 1861–1871
- Preceded by: Matsudaira Tadachika
- Succeeded by: none

Personal details
- Born: September 14, 1851 Mito, Hitachi Province, Japan
- Died: June 8, 1917 (aged 65) Japan
- Parent: Tokugawa Nariaki (father)

Viscount Matsudaira Tadakazu (松平 忠和; September 14, 1851 – June 8, 1917) was the 8th and final daimyō of Shimabara Domain in Hizen Province, Kyūshū, Japan (modern-day Nagasaki Prefecture).

== Biography ==
Tadakazu was the 16th son of the Mito Domain Tokugawa Nariaki, and was thus the younger brother of Shōgun Tokugawa Yoshinobu. In 1861, when the 7th daimyō of Shimabara, Matsudaira Tadachika died without heir, Tadakazu was selected as his replacement, and was posthumously adopted as his son. He assumed the office of daimyō on December 16, 1861 and was awarded lower 6th court rank the same day.

With increasing anti-shogunal activities on part of Satsuma Domain to the south and Chōshū Domain to the east, and with neighboring Saga Domain showing signs of leaning towards the anti-Tokugawa Alliance, the situation in Shimabara domain was increasingly uncertain. To compound the situation, Tadakazu was ordered by Edo to lead his forces against Chōshū in both the First Chōshū Punitive Expedition of 1864, and Second Chōshū Punitive Expedition in 1866. Both expeditions were extremely unpopular among his samurai, many of whom had fallen under the influence of the Sonnō jōi movement.

In 1868, with the start of the Boshin War, he pledged Shimabara domain in support of Emperor Meiji, and proved his loyalty by committing his troops to the northern campaign against the Ōuetsu Reppan Dōmei, fighting at Akita and Morioka.

In June 1869, the title of daimyō was abolished, and he was appointed domain governor. However, in 1871, Shimabara domain itself was abolished with the abolition of the han system, and became part of the new Nagasaki Prefecture. Tadakazu relocated to Tokyo. He later served as chief priest of Nikkō Tōshō-gū in the Meiji period; he was also created viscount (shishaku) under the kazoku peerage system.

Matsudaira Tadakazu died in June 1917, and his grave is at the temple of Honko-ji in Kōta, Aichi.

| Preceded by Matsudaira Tadachika | 8th Lord of Shimabara; 1862-1871 | Succeeded by none |
