= Shimabara =

Shimabara can refer to any of the following:

- Shimabara, Nagasaki, a city in Nagasaki Prefecture, Japan
- Shimabara Peninsula, the geographic feature that hosts Shimabara, Nagasaki
- Shimabara Castle, in Shimabara, Nagasaki
- Shimabara Rebellion (also known as the Battle or Siege of Shimabara), a 1637 uprising of residents of the Nagasaki area against the Shōgun's anti-Christian policies
- Shimabara, Kyoto, an entertainment quarter in Kyoto, Japan
