= Shimabara Domain =

Japanese domain of the Edo period

Shimabara Domain (1618–1871) 島原藩 Hinoe Domain (1600–1618) 日野江藩
- Domain of Japan
- 1600–1614; 1614–1871
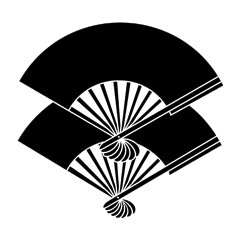
- Mon of the Fukōzu-Matsudaira clan

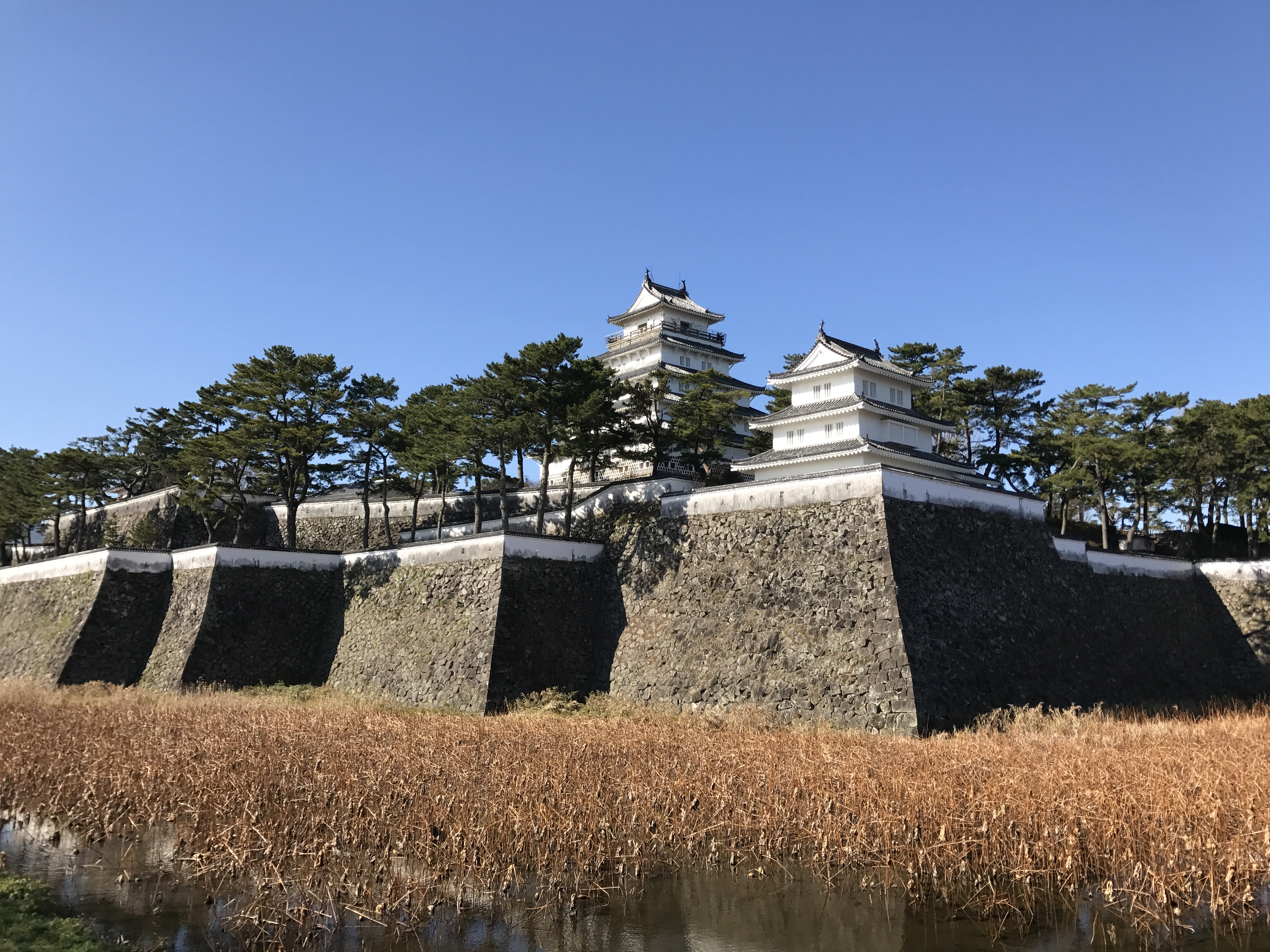
- Far distant view of Shimabara Castle
- Capital: Hinoe Castle (1600–1618); Shimabara Castle (1618–1871)
- Government
  - Type: Daimyō
- Historical era: Edo period
  - Established: 1600
  - Disestablished: 1871
- Today part of: Nagasaki Prefecture
- Location of Shimabara Castle Shimabara Domain (Japan)

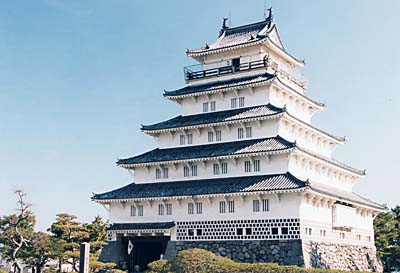
Shimabara Castle

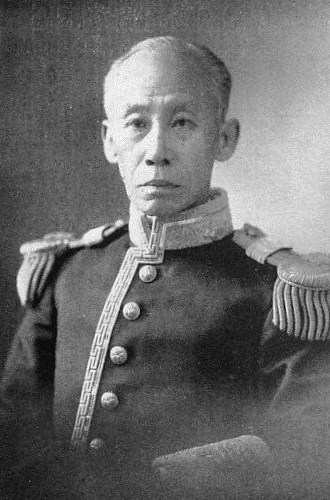
Matsudaira Tadakazu, final daimyo of Shimabara Domain

Shimabara Domain (島原藩, Shimabara-han) was a Japanese domain of the Edo period. Originally known as Hinoe Domain, its administrative center was initially established at Hinoe Castle in Minamishimabara, Nagasaki Prefecture. However, it was later relocated to Shimabara Castle in Shimabara, Nagasaki Prefecture. The domain was governed by various fudai daimyō clans, including the Koriki clan and the Fukōzu-Matsudaira clan.

== History ==
Shimabara was under the rule of the Arima clan in the tumultuous Sengoku period. Arima Harunobu, a daimyō who followed the Christian faith, aligned himself with the eastern army during the Battle of Sekigahara, resulting in the preservation of his domains. However, following the Okamoto Daihachi Incident in 1612, he was imprisoned in Kai Province, and ordered to commit seppuku. Despite this, his son Arima Naozumi distanced himself from his father and had a close relationship with the Tokugawa shogunate. Consequently, he inherited his father's estates after the failed incident. In 1614, Naozumi was transferred to Nobeoka Domain in Hyūga Province. Subsequently, the territory came under direct control of the shogunate for a brief period of time. However, in 1616, Matsukura Shigemasa took over the domain from the Yamato-Gojō Domain for 40,000 koku. Matsukura Shigemasa, unlike his father Matsukura Shigenobu, who had been a respected general, was known for his oppressive policies towards his subjects and harsh treatment of the Kirishitan. Shimabara Castle was constructed during his tenure, and he relocated his seat from Hinoe Castle. Matsukura Katsuie, who succeeded Shigemasa, implemented even more severe policies than his father. As a testament to Katsuie's brutality, there was a method of execution called "Mino Odori," where individuals who could not pay the yearly tax were dressed in a cloak and burned alive. Shimabara was described as a true hell, as even the children of those unable to pay the tax were captured and executed. Additionally, the reported collection of 40,000 koku was inflated to 100,000 koku in order to gain favor with the shogunate.

The people's anger towards Katsuie's oppressive policies eventually erupted, leading to the Shimabara Rebellion of 1637, with Amakusa Shirō as the leader of the rebels seizing Hara Castle. The unpopularity of Matsukura rule so intense that some members of Matsukura's army defected to the rebel side, rendering his forces insufficient to suppress the rebellion. Recognizing the gravity of the situation, the shogunate dispatched a pacification force led by Itakura Shigemasa. However, this force proved ineffective and Itakura perished in battle. Replacing him as the commander-in-chief was Rōjū Matsudaira Nobutsuna. Nobutsuna rallied approximately 120,000 troops from various daimyō to besiege Hara Castle. This army including the seasoned warrior Tachibana Muneshige. The rebel force was no match for the well-supplied shogunate army, which was also supported by a Dutch naval bombardment offshore, resulting in the rebellion's suppression three months later. The rebels, including Amakura Shirō, were mercilessly slaughtered without quarter. Conversely, Matsukura Katsuie also faced severe scrutiny for his role in precipitating the revolt through misgovernment, and he was beheaded after the rebellion was quelled. This denial of the honorable punishment of seppuku and his execution by beheading as a common criminal exemplified the shogunate's grave view of the severity of his crimes.

After Matsukura Katsuie, Kōriki Tadafusa, a long-time retainer of the Tokugawa clan, was transferred from Hamamatsu Domain and worked hard to restore the Shimabara region, which had been devastated by the rebellion. He implemented a skillful agricultural policy and a policy of encouraging colonization from other parts of Japan to resettle the area. However, Kōriki Takanaga, who succeeded Tadafusa, was so eager to establish the domain's revenues that he made many mismanagement decisions, leading to a reprimand from the shogunate and the removal of his domain in 1668. In his place, Matsudaira Tadafusa of the Fukōzu Matsudaira clan was transferred from Fukuchiyama Domain in Tanba Province with a kokudaka of 65,000 koku. The Fukōzu Matsudaira clan ruled Shimabara for the next five generations, but in 1747, the Fukōzu-Matsudaira clan traded places with Toda Tadamitsu of Utsunomiya Domain the kokudaka of the domain increased 77,000 koku. The Toda clan continued for two generations, and in 1774, traded placed back again with the Fukōzu-Matsudaira clan, who then ruled for the next eight generations.

The final daimyō, Matsudaira Tadakazu carried out military reforms due to the need to strengthen coastal defenses in 1863, but to a much lesser extent than neighbouring Saga Domain. As he was a younger half-brother of the Shogun Tokugawa Yoshinobu, he supported the shogunate in the First Chōshū expedition in 1864, and Second Chōshū expedition in 1866. However, his pro-Shogunate actions caused discontent among lower-ranking samurai. many of who were supporters of the Sonnō jōi movement. Some defected from the domain to participate in the Tenchugumi Incident and the Tengutō Rebellion. During the Boshin War, which began in January 1868, he submitted to the Meiji government and sent troops to fight against the pro-Tokugawa remnants in northern Japan. In June 1869, he was appointed imperial governor of Shimabara Domain and with the abolition of the han system on July 14, 1871, he moved to Tokyo. In November of the same year, he received permission from the government to travel to Europe and the United States. In October 1873, he returned to Japan from England, and was later given the kazoku peerage title of viscount.

Shimabara has a warm climate, but is a volcanic region with poor soil, and it is said that the actual harvest yield for tax was less than the official kokudaka.

== Holdings at the end of the Edo period ==
As with most domains in the han system, Shimabara Domain consisted of several discontinuous territories calculated to provide the assigned kokudaka, based on periodic cadastral surveys and projected agricultural yields.

- Hizen Province
  - 33 villages in Takaki District
- Buzen Province
  - 39 villages in Usa District
- Bungo Province
  - 61 villages in Kunisaki District

== List of daimyōs ==
	Name	Tenure	Courtesy title	Court Rank	kokudaka
Arima clan, 1600–1612 (fudai daimyo)
1	Arima Harunobu (有馬晴信)	1600–1612	Shūri-daiyū (修理大夫)	Junior 5th Lower Grade (従五位下)	40,000 koku
2	Arima Naozumi(有馬直純)	1612–1614	Saiemonfu (左衛門佐)	Junior 5th Lower Grade (従五位下)	40,000 koku
tenryō
Matsukura clan, 1616–1630 (fudai daimyo)
1	Matsukura Shigemasa (松倉重政)	1616–1630	Bungo-no-kami (豊後守)	Junior 5th Lower Grade (従五位下)	40,000 koku
2	Matsukura Katsuie (松倉勝家)	1630–1638	Nagato-no-kami (長門守)	Junior 5th Lower Grade (従五位下)	40,000 koku
Kōriki clan, 1638–1668 (fudai daimyo)
1	Kōriki Tadafusa (高力忠房)	1638–1655	Sakontaiyu (左近大夫)	Junior 5th Lower Grade (従五位下)	40,000 koku
2	Kōriki Takanaga (高力高長) (隆長)	1655–1668	Sakontaiyu (左近大夫)	Junior 5th Lower Grade (従五位下)	40,000 koku
Matsudaira (Fukōzu) clan, 1668–1749 (fudai daimyo)
1	Matsudaira Tadafusa (松平忠房)	1669–1698	Tonomori-no-tsukasa (主殿頭)	Junior 4th, Lower Grade (従四位下)	65,000 koku
2	Matsudaira Tadakatsu (松平忠雄)	1698–1735	Tonomori-no-tsukasa (主殿頭)	Junior 4th, Lower Grade (従四位下)	65,000 koku
3	Matsudaira Tadami (松平忠俔)	1735–1738	Tonomori-no-tsukasa (主殿頭)	Junior 5th Lower Grade (従五位下)	65,000 koku
4	Matsudaira Tadatoki (松平忠刻)	1738–1749	Tonomori-no-tsukasa (主殿頭)	Junior 4th, Lower Grade (従四位下)	65,000 koku
5	Matsudaira Tadamasa (松平忠祗)	1749	Tonomori-no-tsukasa (主殿頭)	Junior 4th, Lower Grade (従四位下)	65,000 koku
Toda clan, 1749–1774 (fudai daimyo)
1	Toda Tadamitsu (戸田忠盈)	1749–1774	Hyuga-no-kami (日向守)	Junior 5th Lower Grade (従五位下)	77,000 koku
2	Toda Tadatō (戸田忠寛)	1754–1774	Iki-no-kami (壱岐守)	Junior 5th Lower Grade (従五位下)	77,000 koku
Matsudaira (Fukōzu) clan, 1774–1871 (fudai daimyo)
1	Matsudaira Tadahiro (松平忠恕)	1774–1792	Yamato-no-kami (大和守)	Junior 5th Lower Grade (従五位下)	65,000 koku
2	Matsudaira Tadayori (松平忠馮0	1792–1819	Tonomori-no-tsukasa (主殿頭)	Junior 5th Lower Grade (従五位下)	65,000 koku
3	Matsudaira Tadayoshi (松平忠侯)	1819–1840	Tonomori-no-tsukasa (主殿頭)	Junior 5th Lower Grade (従五位下)	65,000 koku
4	Matsudaira Tadanari (松平忠誠)	1840–1847	Tonomori-no-tsukasa (主殿頭)	Junior 5th Lower Grade (従五位下)	65,000 koku
5	Matsudaira Tadakiyo (松平忠精)	1847–1859	Tonomori-no-tsukasa (主殿頭)	Junior 5th Lower Grade (従五位下)	65,000 koku
6	Matsudaira Tadaatsu (松平忠淳)	1859–1860	Tonomori-no-tsukasa (主殿頭)	Junior 5th Lower Grade (従五位下)	65,000 koku
7	Matsudaira Tadachika (松平忠愛)	1860–1862	Tonomori-no-tsukasa (主殿頭)	Junior 5th Lower Grade (従五位下)	65,000 koku
8	Matsudaira Tadakazu (松平忠和)	1862–1871	Tonomori-no-tsukasa (主殿頭)	Junior 5th Lower Grade (従五位下)	65,000 koku

=== Simplified genealogy (Matsudaira-Fukōzu) ===
- Matsudaira Nobumitsu, 3rd head of the Matsudaira (c. 1400 – c. 1488–89)
  - Chikatada, 4th head of the Matsudaira (c. 1431–1531)
    - Nagachika, 5th head of the Matsudaira (1473–1544)
      - Nobutada, 6th head of the Matsudaira (1490–1531)
        - Kiyoyasu, 7th head of the Matsudaira (1511–1536)
          - Usui-hime, m. Sakai Tadatsugu (1527–1596)
            - Ogasawara Nobuyuki, 1st daimyō of Koga (1570–1614)
              - daughter, (m.?) Mizuno Tadasada
                - daughter, m. Tsuchiya Kazunao, 1st daimyō of Tsuchiura (1608–1679)
                  - Tsuchiya Masanao, 2nd daimyō of Tsuchiura (1641–1722)
                    - Tsuchiya Nobunao, 3rd daimyō of Tsuchiura (1696–1734)
                      - daughter, m. IV. Matsudaira Tadatoki, 4th daimyō of Shimabara (1st creation) (1716–1749; r. 1738–1749).
                        - V. Tadamasa, 5th daimyō of Shimabara (1st creation) (c. 1737–38 – 1801; r. 1749)
                        - I. Tadahiro, 1st daimyō of Shimabara (2nd creation, cr. 1774) (c. 1740–42 – 1792; r. 1774–1792)
                          - II. Tadayori, 2nd daimyō of Shimabara (2nd creation) (1771–1819; r. 1792–1819)
                            - III. Tadayoshi, 3rd daimyō of Shimabara (2nd creation) (1799–1840; r. 1819–1840)
                              - IV. Tadanari, 4th daimyō of Shimabara (2nd creation) (1824–1847; r. 1840–1847)
                              - V. Tadakiyo, 5th daimyō of Shimabara (2nd creation) (1832–1859; r. 1847–1859)
                            - Tadaatsu
                              - VII. Tadachika, 7th daimyō of Shimabara (2nd creation) (1845–1862; r. 1860–1862)
          - Hirotada, 8th head of the Matsudaira (1526–1549)
            - Tokugawa Ieyasu, 1st Tokugawa shōgun (1543–1616; r. 1603–1605)
              - Matsudaira Nobuyasu (1559–1579)
                - Kuma-hime (1577–1626), m. Honda Tadamasa, 2nd daimyō of Kuwana (1575–1631)
                  - Kuni-hime (1595–1649), m. Arima Naozumi, daimyō of Shimabara (1586–1641)
                    - daughter, m. Akimoto Tomitomo, 1st daimyō of Yamura (1610–1657)
                      - daughter, m. Toda Takamasa, 1st daimyō of Sakura (1632–1699)
                        - Toda Tadaaki
                          - Toda Tadami, 2nd daimyō of Utsunomiya (1689–1746)
                            - Toda Tadamitsu, daimyō of Shimabara (1730–1781)
                            - Toda Tadatō, daimyō of Shimabara (1739–1801)
                          - daughter, m. II. Matsudaira Tadakatsu, 2nd daimyō of Shimabara (1st creation) (1673–1736; r. 1698–1735). He adopted a distant relation:
                            - III. Matsudaira Tadami, 3rd daimyō of Shimabara (1st creation) (1712–1738; r. 1735–1738). He adopted a cousin, Tadatoki, son of Matsudaira Kankei, a hatamoto (see above):
              - Kame-hime (1560–1625), m. Okudaira Nobumasa, 1st daimyō of Kanō (1555–1615)
                - Matsudaira Tadaaki, 1st daimyō of Himeji (1583–1644)
                  - Eshō-in, m. Nabeshima Tadanao (1613–1635)
                    - Nabeshima Mitsushige, 2nd daimyō of Saga (1632–1700)
                      - Nabeshima Muneshige, 5th daimyō of Saga (1687–1755)
                        - Nabeshima Harushige, 8th daimyō of Saga (1745–1805)
                          - daughter, m. Date Munetada, 7th daimyō of Uwajima (1792–1889)
                            - VI. Matsudaira Tadaatsu, 6th daimyō of Shimabara (2nd creation) (1841–1860; r. 1859–1860)
              - Tokugawa Yorifusa, 1st daimyō of Mito (1603–1661)
                - Matsudaira Yorishige, 1st daimyō of Takamatsu (1622–1695)
                  - Yoritoshi (1661–1687)
                    - Yoritoyo, 3rd daimyō of Takamatsu (1680–1735)
                      - Tokugawa Munetaka, 4th daimyō of Mito (1705–1730)
                        - Tokugawa Munemoto, 5th daimyō of Mito (1728–1766)
                          - Tokugawa Harumori, 6th daimyō of Mito (1751–1805)
                            - Tokugawa Harutoshi, 7th daimyō of Mito (1773–1816)
                              - Tokugawa Nariaki, 9th daimyō of Mito (1800–1860)
                                - VIII. Tadakazu, 8th daimyō of Shimabara (2nd creation), 8th family head, 1st Viscount (1851–1917; daimyō: 1862–1869; Governor: 1869–1871; family head: 1862–1917; Viscount: cr. 1884)
                                  - Tadaii (1870–1909)
                                    - Tadaryō, 9th family head, 2nd Viscount (1903–1934; 9th family head and 2nd Viscount: 1917–1934)
                                      - Tadasada, 10th family head, 3rd Viscount (born 1928; 10th family head: 1934–present; 3rd Viscount: 1934–1947)
                                        - Tadatsugu (b. 1965)
                                        - Tadaoki (b. 1967)
  - Tadakage (d. 1485)
    - Tadasada
      - Yoshikage (1517–1561)
        - Koretada (1537–1575)
          - Ietada, daimyō of Omigawa (1555–1600)
            - Tadatoshi, 1st daimyō of Yoshida (1582–1632)
              - I. Tadafusa, 1st daimyō of Shimabara (1st creation, cr. 1669) (1619–1700; daimyō: 1669–1698)

== See also ==
- List of Han
- Abolition of the han system
