= Okamoto Daihachi incident =

1612 conspiracy in Japan

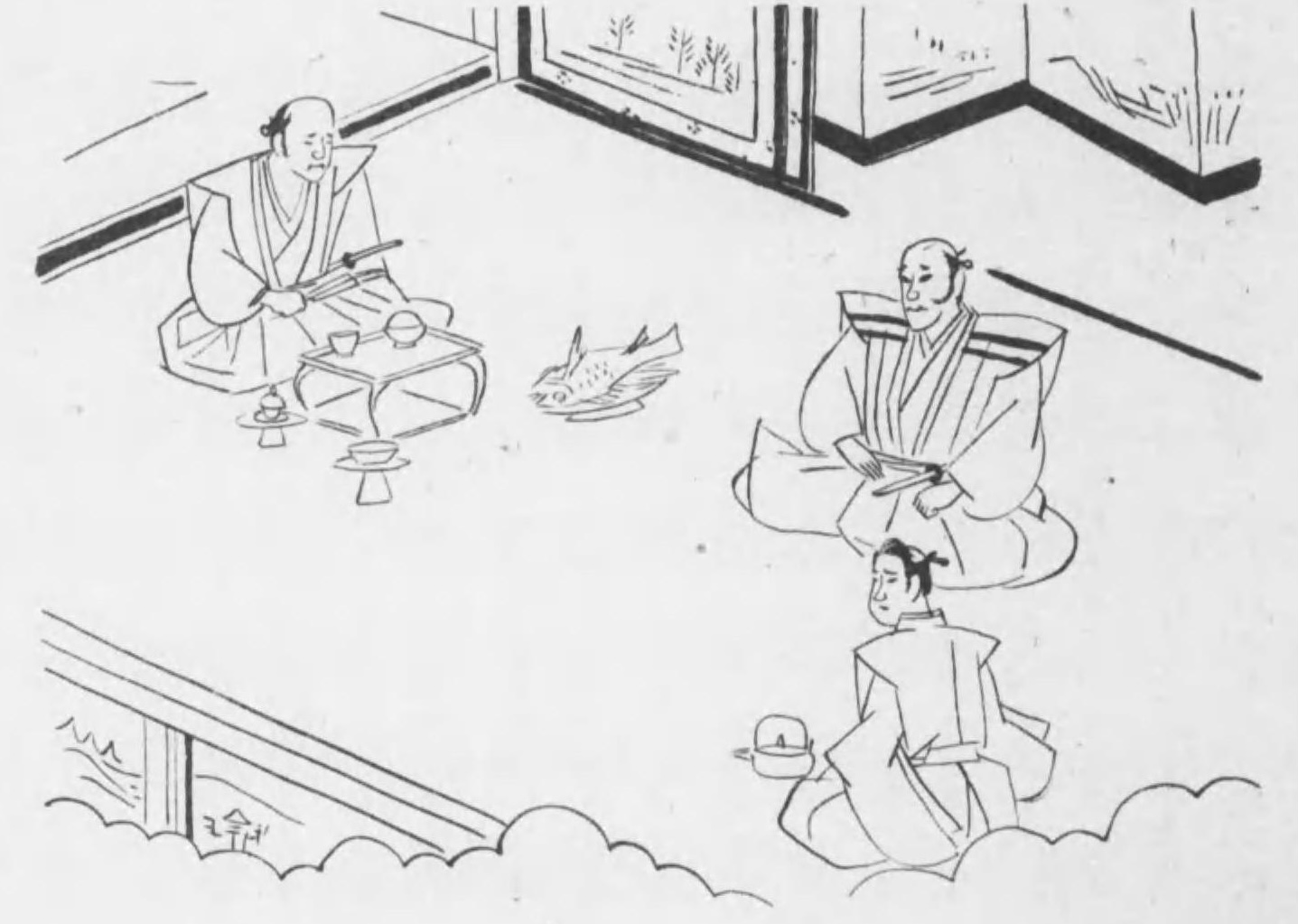
Illustration from Haruo Satō's Arima Harunobu (1943)

The Okamoto Daihachi incident (岡本大八事件) of 1612 refers to the exposure of the intrigues involving the Japanese Christian daimyō and retainers of the early Tokugawa shogunate in Japan. The conspiracy, motivated by the Christian daimyō Arima Harunobu's desire to retake Arima lands in Hizen that were lost in the Sengoku wars, did much to shake the confidence that the Tokugawa regime placed on its Christian subjects, and was attributed as one of the reasons the Tokugawa eventually took an anti-Christian stance, which culminated in the persecution of Christians throughout the country.

== Background ==
In 1543, during the wars of the Sengoku period, the Portuguese landed in Japan for the first time, and soon spread Christianity throughout Japan from Kyushu. Regional daimyō, or feudal lords, were eager to trade with the Portuguese for their European arquebus, while the Portuguese saw the Japanese as potential converts to the Christian religion, preferring to trade with those who converted. Trade and religion thus tied, many daimyo became Christian, such that at the eve of unification of Japan by Tokugawa Ieyasu in 1600, as many as 14 daimyo at the time were baptised. Even when some of those Christian daimyo supported Ieyasu at the decisive Battle of Sekigahara, many other Christian daimyo rallied around the heir of Toyotomi Hideyoshi. In any case, the question remained for the unifier of Japan where the Christian lords' loyalties ultimately lay.

Arima Harunobu, the daimyo of Hinoe Domain, became one of the most important supporters of the Church in post-Sekigahara Japan as Tokugawa Ieyasu became shōgun and purged his enemies, like the influential Christian lord Konishi Yukinaga. In the first decade of the Tokugawa shogunate, Arima Harunobu was able to keep his fief and was given the right to send red seal ships to trade overseas. In one of these voyages in 1608, the crew of a red seal ship belonging to Harunobu became involved in a deadly quarrel in Portuguese Macau after coming back from Cambodia to fetch a cargo of agarwood for Ieyasu, resulting in 50 Arima samurai being killed under the orders of the Captain-major André Pessoa (Red Seal Ship incident). The same captain-major came to Nagasaki on the Nossa Senhora da Graça to trade in 1609, and Arima Harunobu took this opportunity to seek permission from Tokugawa Ieyasu to avenge his dead men. Ieyasu acceded - although the Portuguese controlled much of the Nanban trade, Ieyasu sought to decouple the close relationship between that trade and Christianity. Arima Harunobu thereupon took a flotilla of 1,200 men to attack Pessoa in Nagasaki, and after a three-day engagement, the Nossa Senhora da Graça sank in an explosion bringing Pessoa down with it on January 6, 1610. However, this victory for Harunobu soon led to his downfall.

== Intrigues ==
For Arima's part in sinking the Nossa Senhora da Graça, Ieyasu not only rewarded Arima Harunobu with a prized sword, but also presented his granddaughter Kunihime (国姫) as wife for Harunobu's son Naozumi. This proved to be problematic for the Arima, as Naozumi had followed Christianity like his father and had married a Christian girl. Naozumi eventually repudiated his legitimate wife in favour of Kunihime, showing that, rather than standing by his faith and family, Naozumi opted to not risk offending Ieyasu.

Harunobu apparently felt that his efforts during the Nossa Senhora da Graça incident warranted further rewards — namely the return of the territories Isahaya and Kōjiro (神代) in Hizen Province that the Arima lost during the Sengoku period. To this end, Harunobu bribed Okamoto Daihachi (岡本大八, baptismal name Paulo), a Christian aide to the rōjū Honda Masazumi, who advised Ieyasu on affairs concerning the redistribution of fiefs. However, Okamoto took the money and did not follow through; instead, he strung Harunobu on by forging documents promising to reward Arima with the territories, then claiming that the reward had been revoked due to the interference of the Governor of Nagasaki Hasegawa Fujihiro. Harunobu, after seeking further assistance from a Jesuit priest on this matter to no avail, brought the issue directly to Ieyasu in 1612, bringing Okamoto's scam to light. At this juncture, Naozumi turned against his father and told Ieyasu of Harunobu's underhanded dealings with Okamoto.

That the investiture of fiefs, a matter that defines the feudal relations of the Tokugawa shogunate, could be bought and sold was deeply troubling to Tokugawa Ieyasu. He sentenced Okamoto Daihachi to death by burning for forging shōgunal documents, but not before Daihachi had a chance to reveal that Arima Harunobu had conspired to kill Hasegawa Fujihiro. As the important port city of Nagasaki was governed directly by a shogunate-appointed official (rather than through a daimyō), this conspiracy was seen as an affront to Tokugawa rule. For this and his bribery, Harunobu was exiled to Kai Province in late 1612, and was ordered to commit suicide by seppuku the next year. However, Harunobu refused to kill himself on grounds of his faith, and instead had his head cut off. Naozumi was allowed to inherit his father's fief for his part in denouncing Harunobu.

== Aftermath ==
The fact that the perpetrators of this episode of bribery, conspiracy, forgery, and attempted murder were both Christians was not lost on Ieyasu. The retired shōgun was further incensed to hear that Christian followers had gathered at Okamoto's execution to offer prayers and sing hymns, cementing in his mind that the creed encouraged insubordination against the shogunate. Ieyasu later referenced this incident along with other executions of Christian criminals in 1614:

If they see a condemned fellow, they run to him with joy, bow to him, and do him reverence. This they say is the essence of their belief. If this is not an evil law, what is it? They truly are the enemies of the Gods and of Buddha.

In the same year as the Daihachi incident was uncovered, Ieyasu evicted the Christian servants of his household and forbade his vassals from following Christianity or risk having their revenues withheld. On January 27, 1614, the prohibition was extended to everyone regardless of class or origin, including all missionaries without exception. This order was unevenly followed by Ieyasu's vassals, as domains that were predominantly Christian or sufficiently far from the central did not interfere with their Christian subjects up to 1623. However, in Shimabara Domain (formerly the Hinoe Domain), Arima Naozumi apostatized and pursued a campaign of persecution of Christians, killing even his two half-brothers, aged 8 and 6. He was transferred to Nobeoka in Hyūga Province in mid-1614, leaving behind a restive Christian population that would instigate the Shimabara Rebellion in 1637.
