= André Pessoa =

Portuguese soldier

- Born: 1560; Azambuja, Portugal
- Died: 6 January 1610 (aged 49–50); Nagasaki Bay, Japan
- Relatives: Lourenço Pessoa (father); Francisca Calado (mother)
- Military career
- Allegiance: Kingdom of Portugal; Pro-Philip faction Iberian Union
- Branch: Portuguese Navy
- Service years: 1577–1610
- Rank: Captain-major
- Conflicts: War of the Portuguese Succession; Dutch–Portuguese War; Nossa Senhora da Graça incident ‡‡

André Pessoa (1560 – 6 January 1610) was a Portuguese soldier and Captain-major better known for his service in Macau and Nagasaki.

== Early life ==
André Pessoa was born in 1560, Azambuja, Portugal. He was the son of Lourenço Pessoa and Francisca Calado.

== Career ==
=== Early career ===
Pessoa began his military career at a young age, traveling to India in 1577. He returned to Europe shortly thereafter and, in 1583, participated in an expedition to the Azores, where he fought against the supporters of Prior of Crato, the pretender to the Portuguese throne.

=== In Malacca, 1584–1606 ===
In 1584, he returned to the East with the Secretary of the Factory at Malacca. He accompanied André Furtado de Mendonça to the Moluccas from 1601 to 1603, and participated in the siege of Malacca against the Dutch from May to August 1606. Pessoa was the captain of a bulwark and was wounded in the right arm during the siege. In October of the same year, Pessoa was captured with his ship São Simão by Cornelis Matelief de Jonge. He was later ransomed for 6,000 ducats. His contribution during one of the battles was referenced by Faria e Sousa.

=== In Macau, 1607–1609 ===
After his release from Dutch custody, Pessoa bought the privilege to captain the Japan voyage and made his way to Macau in 1607. Ten days after arriving in Macau, Pessoa warded off a Dutch squadron led by Matelief who had come to trade with the Chinese.

In 1608 or 1609, a red seal ship belonging to Arima Harunobu anchored in Macau. After an attack on a Portuguese magistrate and his men, Pessoa, now Captain-major, ordered his crew to intervene. Pessoa blamed the Japanese for the incident, however, Ieyasu blamed Pessoa, but he was hesitant to take drastic action, as it would result in the loss of the silk trade.

=== In Japan and death, 1609–1610 ===
The following year, on June 29, 1609, Pessoa commanded the Portuguese carrack Nossa Senhora da Graça (also known as Madre de Deus) on a voyage to Japan and arrived in Nagasaki. On January 3, 1610, the ship was besieged by forces under Arima Harunobu, seeking retribution for the previous incident in Macau. After days of intense conflict, Pessoa, facing overwhelming odds, chose to scuttle the ship by setting the gunpowder storage on fire, resulting in its destruction. Pessoa's body was never found.

== Bibliography ==
- Boxer, C. R. (1986). Portuguese Merchants and Missionaries in Feudal Japan, 1543-1640. Variorum Reprints. ISBN 0860781801.
- Boxer, C. R. (1979) [1st. pub. 1929]. "The affair of the Madre de Deus". In Moscato, Michael (ed.). Papers on Portuguese, Dutch, and Jesuit Influences in 16th- and 17th-Century Japan: Writings of Charles Ralph Boxer. Washington, D.C.: University Publications of America. pp. 4–94. ISBN 0890932557.
- Boxer, C. R. (1951). The Christian Century in Japan: 1549–1650. University of California Press. GGKEY:BPN6N93KBJ7.
- Kshetry, Gopal (2008). Foreigners in Japan: A Historical Perspective. Xlibris Corporation. ISBN 9781469102443.
- Boxer, C. R. (1948). Fidalgos in the Far East, 1550–1770. The Hague: Martinus Nijhoff.
- Hesselink, Reinier H. (2015). The Dream of Christian Nagasaki: World Trade and the Clash of Cultures, 1560-1640. McFarland. ISBN 978-0786499618.
