= Toda Tadatō =

Japanese daimyō

Toda Tadatō (戸田 忠寛; October 17, 1739 – March 14, 1801) was a Japanese daimyō of the Edo period. He was daimyō of Shimabara.
