= Arima Haruzumi =

Arima Haruzumi (有馬 晴純, 1483 – March 19, 1566) was a Japanese feudal lord in the Sengoku period.

== Biography ==
Initially known as Arima Sadazumi, he held the title of Shuri-dayu and a position in the shobanshu, the private guard of the Shogun. His tenure as lord had the Arima at the height of their power, controlling trade in the strategically important Shimabara Peninsula, near modern-day Nagasaki. Ashikaga Yoshiharu, the 12th Ashikaga shōgun, recognizing his strategic importance and strength, allowed him to take a character from his name and call himself "Haruzumi."

In 1546 he attacked Ryuzoji Iekane's Mizu-ga-e Castle, and while he captured it, Iekane led a counterattack after a mere two months, recapturing it. After this, Haruzumi gave his second son in adoption to the Omura clan, and it was this son who would become Ōmura Sumitada. In the course of his tenure as lord, Haruzumi clashed with many local daimyōs such as the Goto, Hirai, Matsuura, Omura, Saigo, and Taku. He soon on expanded the Arima to control five districts of Hizen Province. As a result of his military conquests and political maneuvering, Haruzumi was able to control all of Hizen Province by way of political maneuvering.

In his later years, Portuguese vessels began to appear in the waters controlled by the Arima, and the family profited from foreign trade. While Christianity spread greatly, Haruzumi did not like the faith, and persecuted it.

His son Yoshisada succeeded him.
