= Shimabara Castle =

Japanese castle in Nagasaki prefecture

- 島原城
- Shimabara, Nagasaki prefecture, Japan
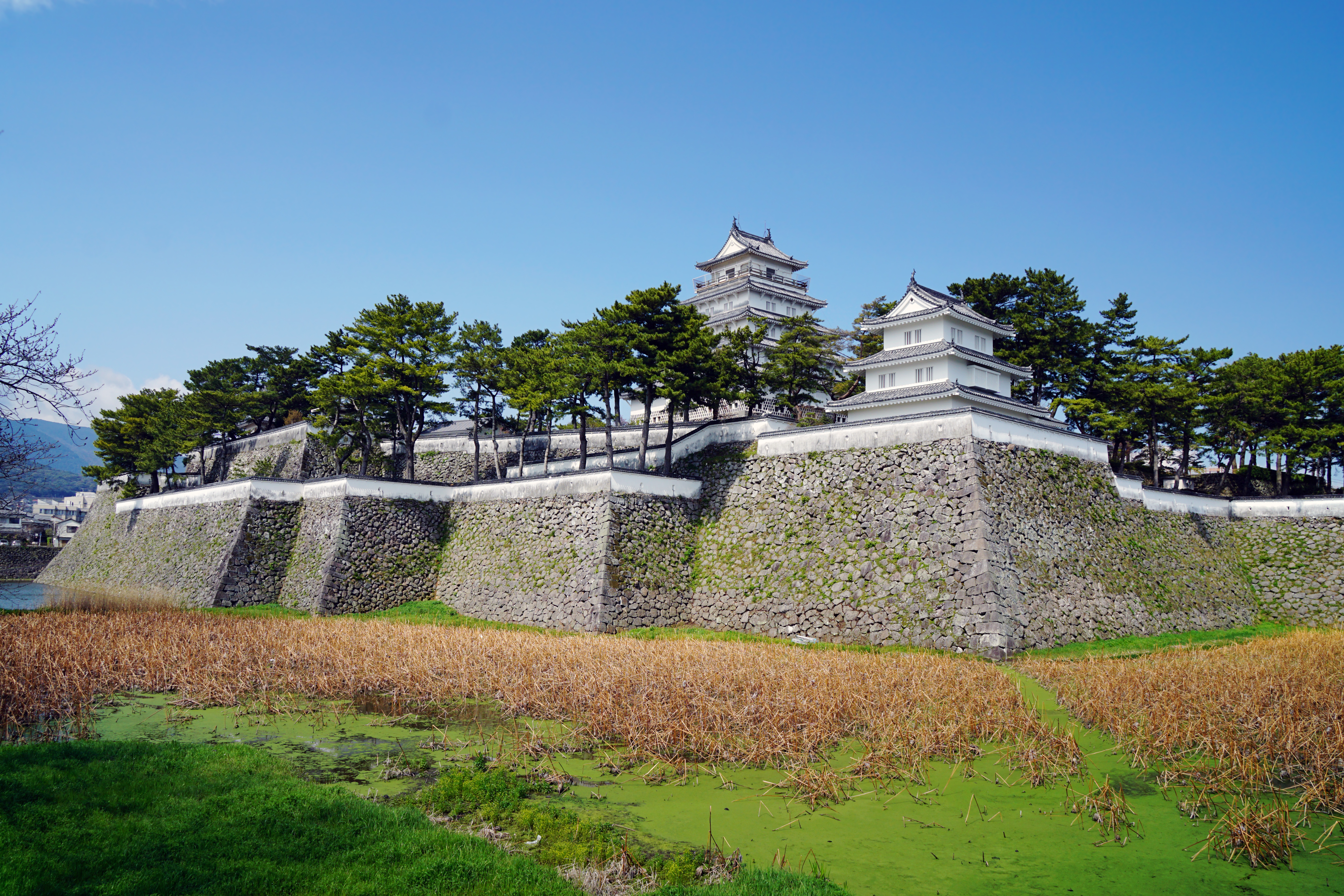
- Inner Bailey

Site information
- Type: Hira-style Japanese castle
- Open to the public: yes
- Condition: Moat and stone walls original; remainder of the complex was rebuilt in 1964

Location
- Shimabara Castle
- Location within Nagasaki Prefecture Location within Japan
- Coordinates: 32°47′21.18″N 130°22′2.15″E
- Height: 33 metres (108 ft)

Site history
- Built: 1624
- Built by: Matsukura Shigemasa
- In use: Edo period
- Demolished: 1874
- Battles/wars: Shimabara Rebellion
- National Historic Site of Japan

Shimabara Castle (島原城, Shimabara-jō), also known as Moritake Castle (森岳城, Moritake-jō) and Takaki Castle (高来城, Takaki-jō), is a Japanese castle located in Shimabara, Hizen Province (present day Nagasaki prefecture). This five-story white building stands in stark contrast to the black Kumamoto Castle in neighboring Kumamoto Prefecture.

== Overview ==
Shimabara Castle faces Ariake Bay and is located at the foot of Mount Unzen. The castle is a rectangular linked-wall flatland-style (flatland castle (平城, Hirajiro)) castle, characterized by high stone walls. The outer moats, some 15 meters deep and between 30–50 meters wide, extended 360 meters east-west and 1260 meters north-south, with the enclosed area divided into three baileys. The walls extended for 3900 meters and had 16 yagura of various sizes at key points. The main enclosure is also surrounded by a moat and is connected to the second enclosure by a single wooden corridor bridge. Destroying the bridge would allow the main enclosure to be isolated, but on the other hand it would be trapped, and the corridor bridge would make it difficult for arrows to hit enemies on the bridge so this was a flaw in the layout. The main tenshu had five stories, and a height of 33 meters, and was connected to two secondary tenshu. In terms of scale, it was far larger than normal for a daimyō with revenues of only 40,000 koku.

== History ==
The Kirishitan Arima clan, who ruled over the Shimabara peninsula from the late Muromachi period from Hinoe Castle and Hara Castle were transferred to Nobeoka Domain in 1616 by the Tokugawa shogunate. The Arima were replaced as daimyō of Shimabara Domain by Matsukura Shigemasa as a reward for his services in the Siege of Osaka. This was soon after the shogunate banned Christianity from 1614 and Matsukura strictly enforced the prohibition against Christianity with mass executions. In 1618, he began the construction of Shimabara Castle using forced labor. Construction was plagued with difficulties due to the loose lava soil of the site, which created problems for supporting the weight of the stone walls, and construction took seven years and the castle was not completed until 1624. During this period, Matsukura raised taxes severely, partly to pay for the construction costs of the castle. This oppression of the peasants was a major factor leading to the Shimabara Rebellion of 1637 to 1638. The castle came under siege during the Shimabara Rebellion, but was not damaged. It subsequently served as the seat of the Kōriki clan, who ruled Shimabara from 1638–1668, Matsudaira clan (1669–1747, 1774–1871) and Toda clan (1747–1774). The Matsudaira daimyō remained in residence at Shimabara Castle until the Meiji Restoration of 1868.

It was the seat of the local government until 1871, when the former Shimabara Domain was merged into the new Nagasaki prefecture. The castle was abolished by the Meiji government in 1874 and the tenshu was pulled down in 1876, as were most of the supporting structures, and the land sold to the private sector. The third bailey became a school grounds, and most of the inner bailey was given over to farmland.

Today, only the moat and stone walls remain from the original structure. The West Yagura was restored in 1960, and the tenshu was rebuilt in 1964 in reinforced concrete as a city museum containing exhibits of the Kirishitan culture, Shimabara Rebellion and feudal period. In 1972, the Tatsumi Yagura was restored. It became a memorial museum in honor of Seibo Kitamura, a noted sculptor, in 1980. Also in 1980, the Ushitora Yagura was restored. A Tourism Revival Memorial Hall was opened on the castle grounds to convey information about the Unzen-Fugen volcanic disaster in 1996. In 2006, the Shimabara Castle was listed one of the 100 Fine Castles of Japan by the Japan Castle Foundation.

In 2016, Shimabara Castle was designated as a Nagasaki Prefecture Historic Site. It was upgraded to a National Historic Site in 2025.

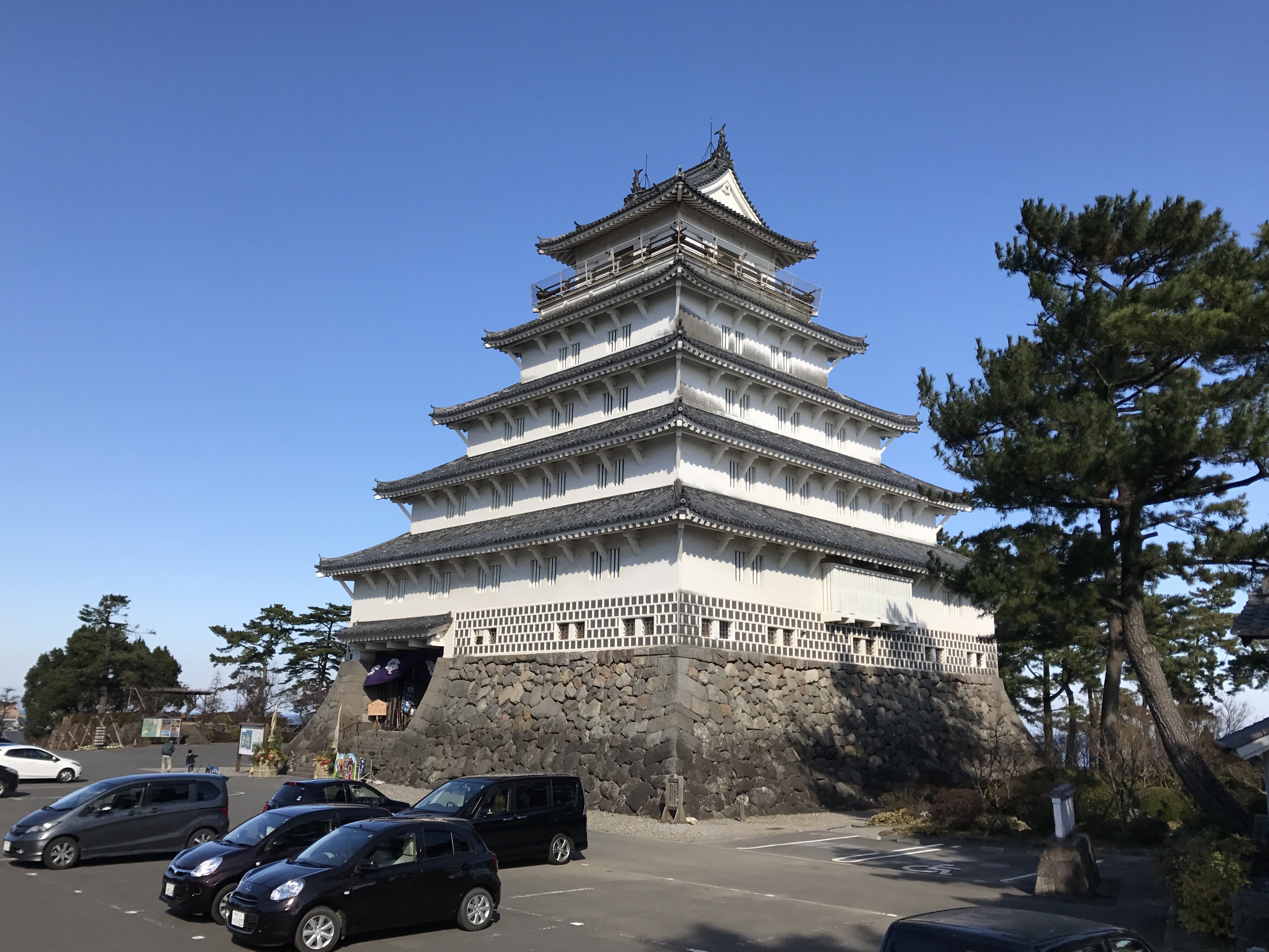
Tenshu

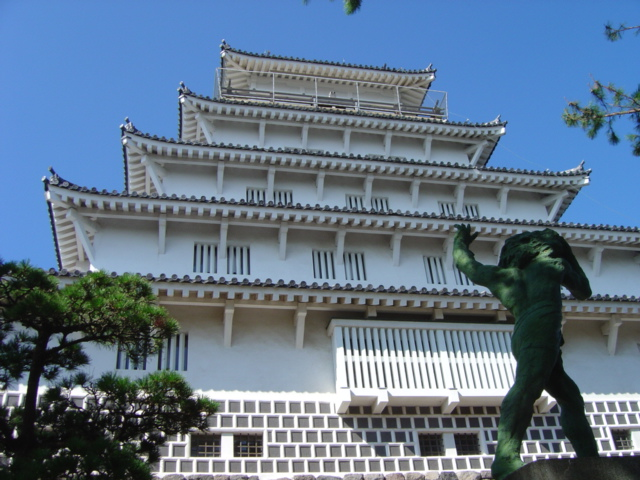
Tenshu

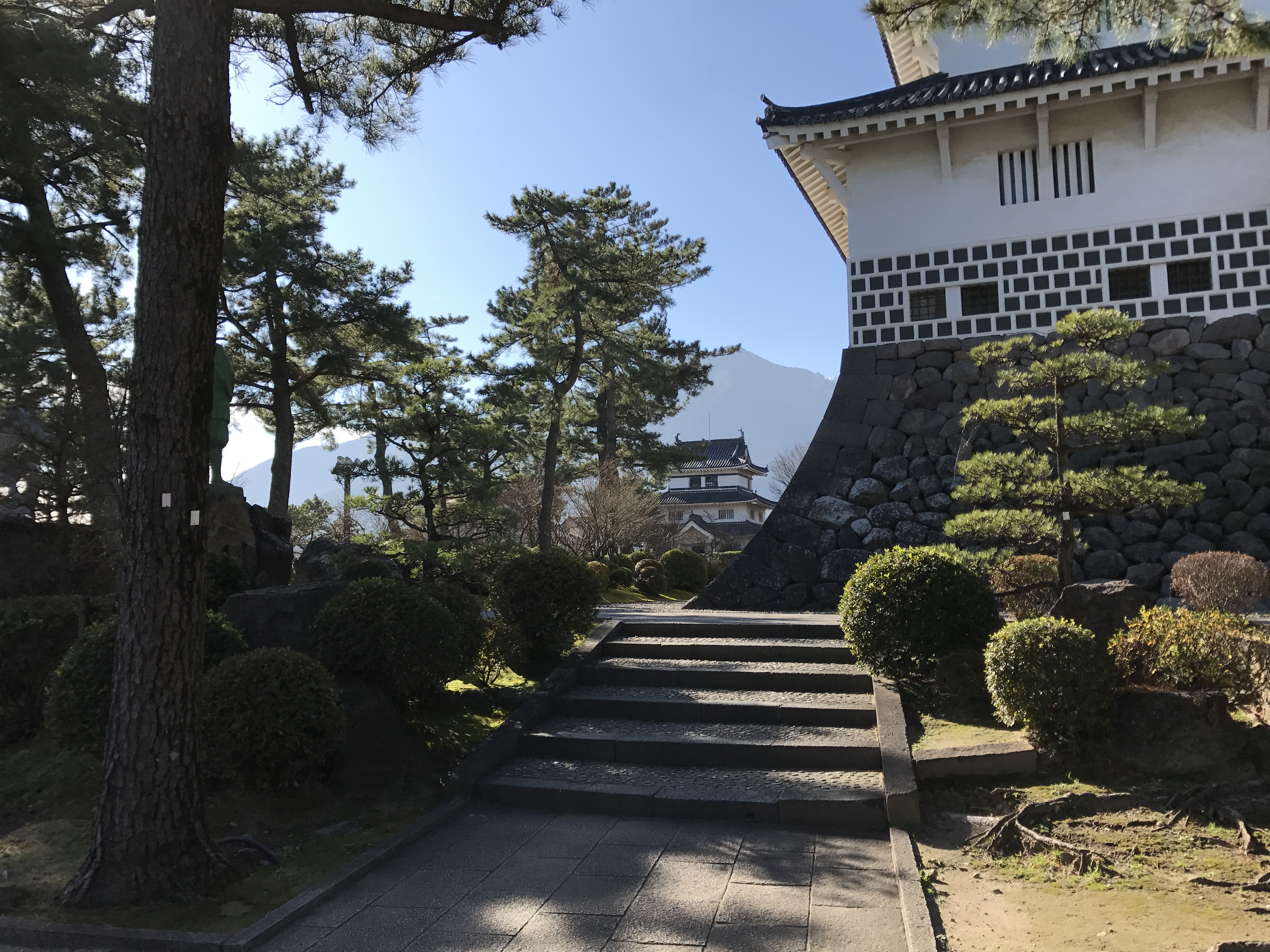
Mount Unzen and the West Yagura

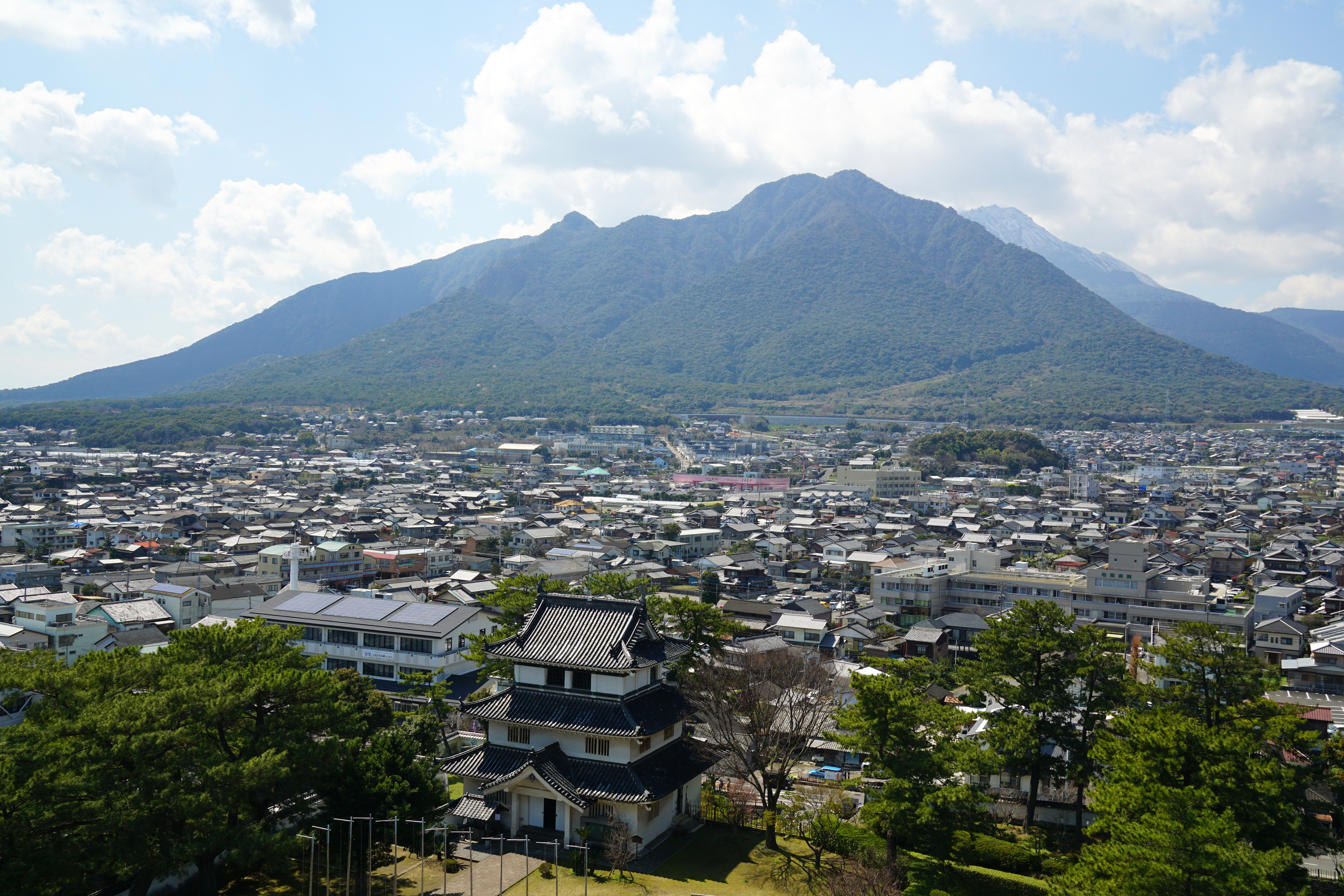
Mount Unzen from the tenshu

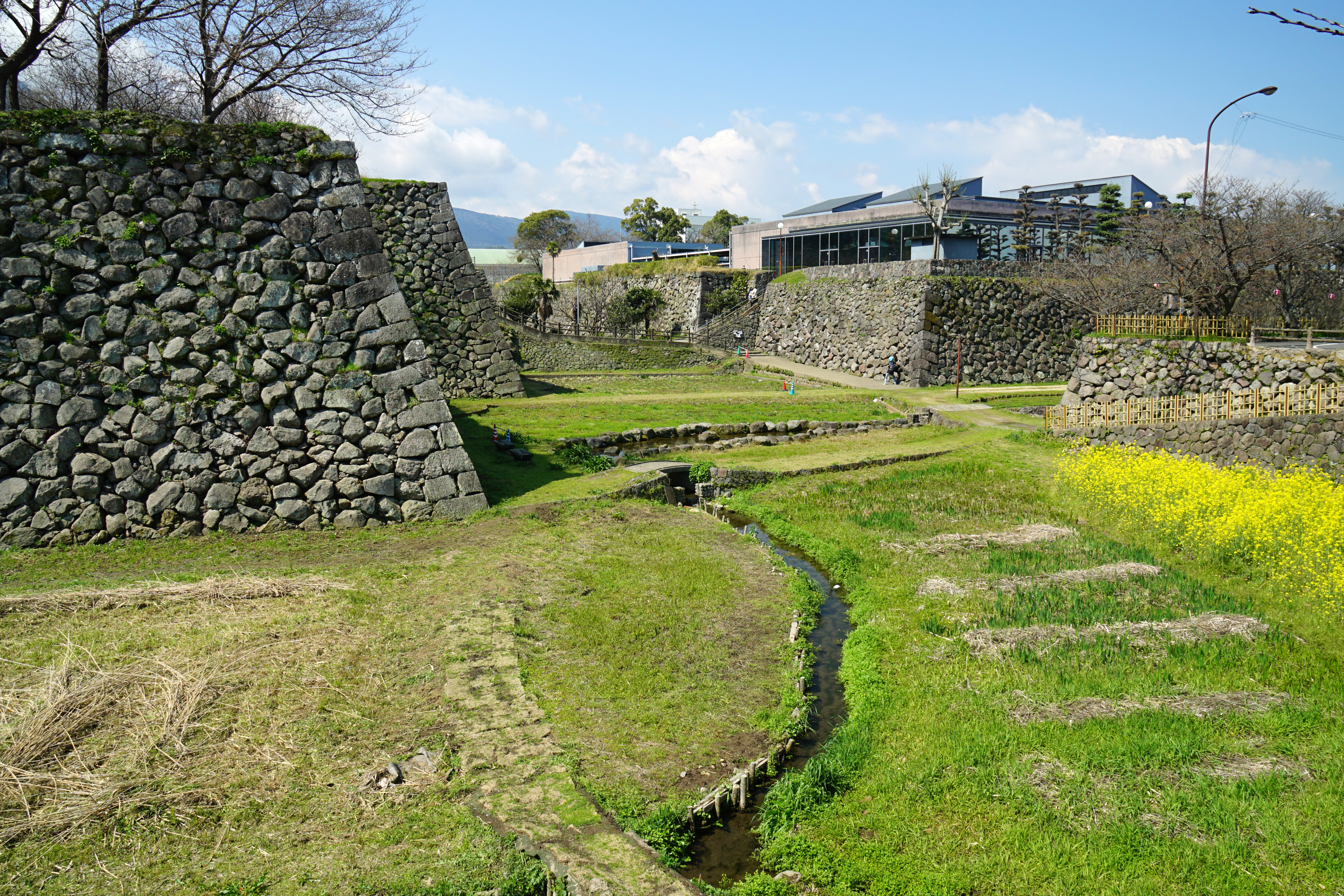
Inner Bailey and Ni-no-maru bailey

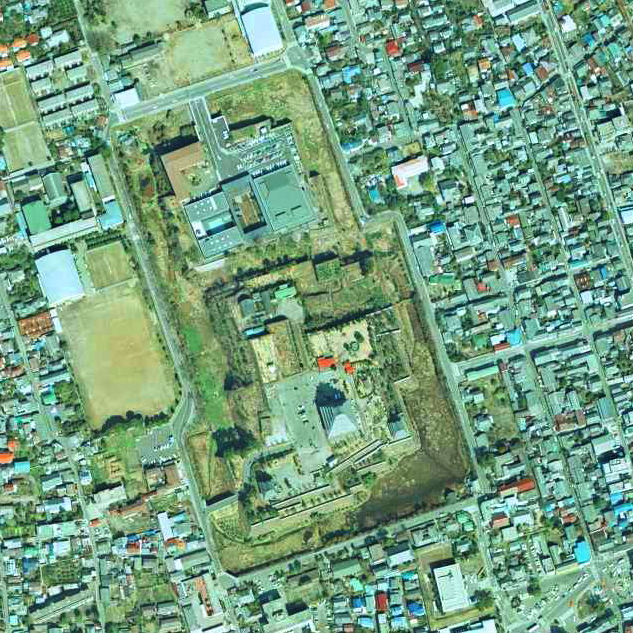
Aerial photograph

== See also ==
- List of Historic Sites of Japan (Nagasaki)
