= Arima Harunobu =

Japanese samurai lord (1567–1612)

- 有馬 晴信
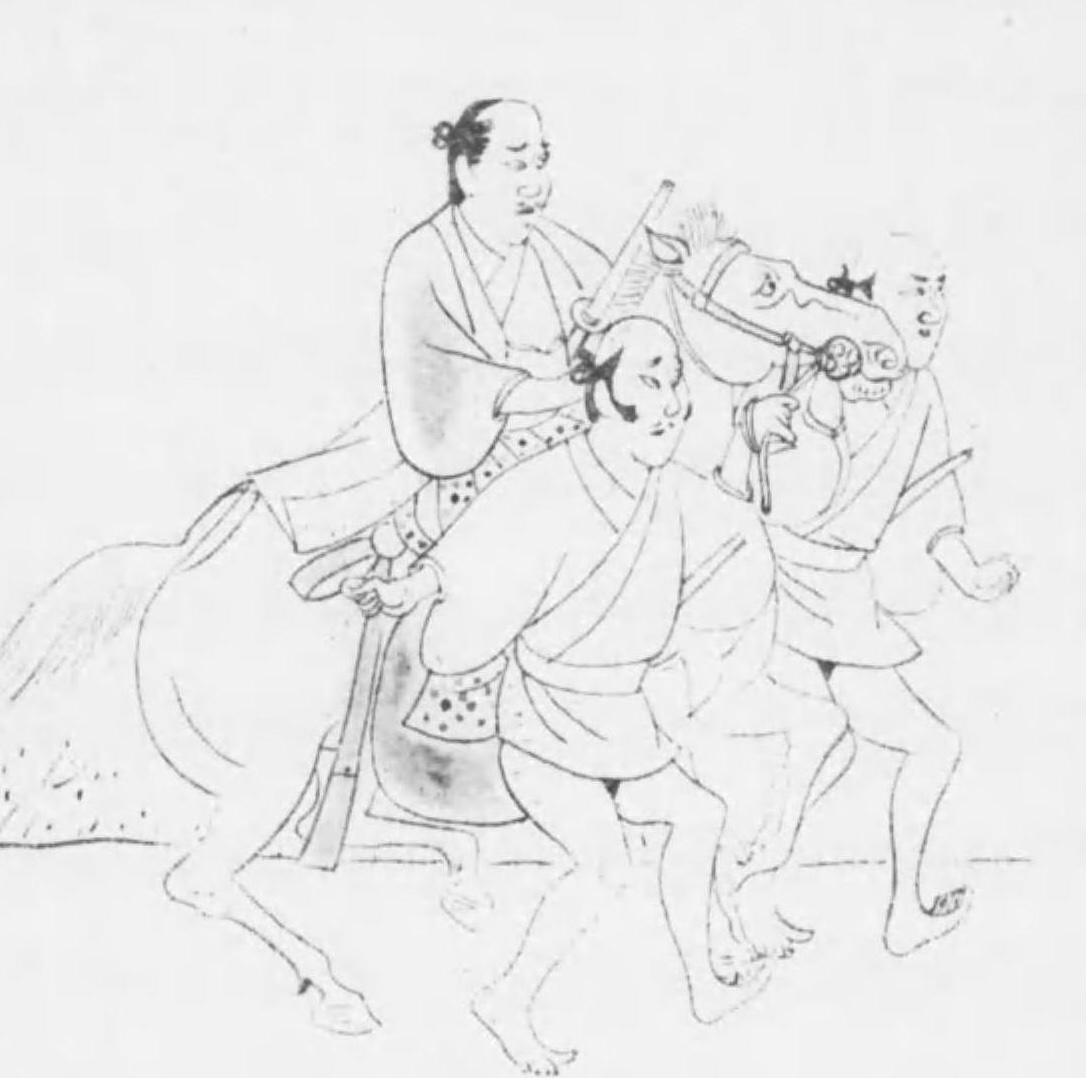
- Illustration from Haruo Satō's Arima Harunobu (1943)

Head of Hizen-Arima clan
- In office 1571–1612
- Preceded by: Arima Yoshisada
- Succeeded by: Arima Naozumi

Daimyo of Shimabara
- In office 1600–1612
- Succeeded by: Arima Naozumi

Personal details
- Born: 1567 Hinoe Castle, Japan
- Died: June 5, 1612 (aged 44–45) Kai Province

Military service
- Allegiance: Arima clan Ryuzoji clan Shimazu clan Toyotomi clan Eastern Army; Tokugawa Shogunate
- Rank: Daimyo
- Battles/wars: Battle of Okitanawate (1584); Kyushu Campaign (1587); Korean campaign (1592); Sekigahara Campaign (1600); Nossa Senhora da Graça incident (1610); Okamoto Daihachi incident (1612)

Arima Harunobu (有馬 晴信; 1567 – June 5, 1612) was a Japanese samurai lord who was the daimyo of Shimabara Domain and the head of the Hizen-Arima clan from Hizen Province. In his early years, he was a retainer of Ryūzōji clan.

== Biography ==
Harunobu was born in Hinoe Castle, the Arima clan castle that controlled the Shimabara area of Hizen Province. He was the second son and successor of Arima Yoshisada. After Yoshisada's death, he began the persecution of Kirishitan in his region. With Ryūzōji Takanobu expanding into his domain, Harunobu turned to the help of the Jesuits.

Harunobu was baptized by Alessandro Valignano in 1579. His conversion was spurred by the prospects of the goods and military assistance offered by the Portuguese. He took the baptismal name Protasius, and later took the name John when he received Confirmation. As a result of his conversion to Christianity, Harunobu started to receive weapons from the Portuguese, which strengthened the Arima clan. Harunobu also founded a seminary and training center for novices in his domain where, apart from the ordinary curriculum, students were also taught European music, painting and sculpture and the manufacture of organs and pocketwatch.

Soon after the conversion, Harunobu and the Jesuits ordered the destruction of over 40 Buddhist and Shinto temples and shrines in the domain, along with the forced evictions of Buddhist monks. Before their destruction, the temples and shrines were said to be some of the most stunning and famed in all of Japan.

In 1582, Harunobu teamed up with the Kyūshū Christian daimyo Ōtomo Sōrin and Ōmura Sumitada to send a Japanese embassy to the Pope in Rome, led by Valignano and represented by Mancio Itō.

During the year 1582, Harunobu lost Shimabara Castle and was reduced to holding a thin strip of the peninsula. Harunobu called for the help of the Shimazu clan against the forces of Ryūzōji Takanobu. The Shimazu sent Shimazu Iehisa to Shimabara. During the year 1584, the combined forces of the Arima and the Shimazu, with over 3,000 troops, defeated that of the Ryūzōji clan. The battle that they fought was known as the Battle of Okitanawate. During that battle, Ryūzōji Takanobu was killed. Afterwards, Shimazu Yoshihisa suggested that the Arima renounce Christianity, but this was only refused by Harunobu.

In 1586, he had a vision in which there appeared to him two persons of celestial exterior, who thus spoke to him: "Know that on the lands over which you rule, the sign of Jesus is found; honor and love it much, for it is not the work of man." Six months afterwards, it happened that a fervent Christian from the neighborhood of Arima sent his son to the woods to cut firewood. On his arrival the young man noticed a tree that was somewhat dried up; he split it in two, and found inserted in the middle of it a cross of a brown color and of a regular form. As soon as Harunobu heard of this, he went to the place, and on seeing the cross he cried out: "Behold the sign of Jesus, that I was told was hidden in my dominions, and that was not made by the hand of man." He then fell on his knees, and after having venerated it amidst many tears, he had it carried to Arima, where by his order it was formed in a magnificent crystal. This miraculous cross brought about the conversion of twenty thousand people. When Toyotomi Hideyoshi expelled the Catholic fathers and outlawed the teaching of Christianity in 1587, the Arima domain became a refuge for many Christian missionaries and believers.

After Kyūshū was invaded in 1587, Harunobu allied with Toyotomi Hideyoshi. During the year 1592, the allied force led some 2,000 men to Korea under Konishi Yukinaga. During the Battle of Sekigahara in 1600, Harunobu supported Tokugawa Ieyasu, and thus did not lose any land after the battle.

== Okamoto Daihachi incident ==
During the year 1609, Harunobu was tasked to scout out a potential trade center for Japanese, Chinese, and Western ships. When they arrived in Formosa (Taiwan), the indigenous Formosans attacked Harunobu's men, and many were killed. Later that same year, a trading party Harunobu had sent to Champa was attacked by the Portuguese while stopping at Macau. Harunobu retaliated the following year by attacking the Portuguese trading ship Madre de Deus, bound for Nagasaki from Macau. Immediately following this incident, the Okamoto Daihachi incident resulted in Arima Harunobu's death.

A certain Okamoto Daihachi, who was a servant of Tokugawa Ieyasu's close advisor Honda Masazumi, was sent to Harunobu to congratulate him on his triumph against the Portuguese. Okamoto was also a Christian and he was entertained by Arima Harunobu with a feast. During the banquet, Okamoto told Arima that through his influence upon his master, he could help Arima recover three districts (gun (郡)) that were lost to the Ryūzōji clan over the preceding years. Arima believed him and sent him payments of gold and silver to lobby for him in the Tokugawa government.

However, Okamoto pocketed the money and never did anything about the situation. When Arima Harunobu encountered Honda Masazumi during his obligatory visit to Edo, he learned that Honda was unaware of Harunobu's dealings with Okamoto. Furious with Okamoto, Arima presented the case to Tokugawa Ieyasu. Ieyasu immediately imprisoned Okamoto; further investigation revealed that Arima had various other dealings with Okamoto and they were involved in a conspiracy to assassinate the Bugyo of Nagasaki. In the end, Okamoto was sentenced to death by burning, while Arima was stripped of his holdings and exiled to Kai Province.

== Death ==
When Arima was ordered by the Shogunate to commit suicide, Arima refused based upon his Christian principles and instead ordered his retainers to behead him.

St. Alphonsus Liguori wrote of his death as follows:

The emperor had deposed and exiled him, in consequence of an odious intrigue concocted against him by his own son, named Michael. In his exile King John led a very penitent life, to repair all the bad example that he had given, and he desired nothing so much as to expiate by his death his past iniquities. God soon brought about the accomplishment of his desires.

Prince Michael, not content with having thus humbled his father, and with seating himself on his throne, wished also to deprive him of life. He had him accused to the emperor of several supposed crimes. The latter, taking counsel only of the hatred that he bore him, condemned him without trial to be beheaded, and sent one hundred and fifty soldiers to carry out the sentence. It is the custom in Japan that when it is desired that a prince should die, the persons of his court defend him till death. But John begged his servants not to oppose his execution, and through affection for him they obeyed most reluctantly. Moreover, he made them swear not to open his body after death ... He then wrote to his unnatural son a letter full of tenderness, and asked his pardon should he ever have offended him. He afterwards had the Passion of Jesus Christ read to him, praying with tears that the many sins of his past life might be forgiven him. Having had a crucifix put before him, he went on his knees and calmly awaited the death-blow. The good Princess Justa, his wife, who was present, took the head of her husband between her hands and kissed it. Then she withdrew to her apartments, where she cut off her hair, indicating thereby that she renounced the world.

The new king of Arima, the infamous parricide Michael, after having taken possession of all the goods of his father, declared war against the Christian religion ...

His son Arima Naozumi married Tokugawa Ieyasu's adopted daughter Kuni-hime and as a result inherited the land that was confiscated from his father.

Preceded by Arima Yoshizumi	Arima family head 1571–1612	Succeeded by Arima Naozumi
Preceded by none	Lord of Shimabara; 1600–1612	Succeeded by Arima Naozumi
