= Arima (Cilicia) =

Town of ancient Cilicia

Coordinates: 36°26′29″N 34°06′52″E

Arima (Ancient Greek: Ἄριμα), also called Krine, was a town of ancient Cilicia, on the coast east of Seleucia ad Calycadnum. Arima was noted in Greek mythology in connection with Typhon and Arima, couch of Typhoeus.

Its site is tentatively located near Narlıkuyu in Asiatic Turkey.
