= Arima Naozumi =

Japanese samurai lord

- 有馬 直純
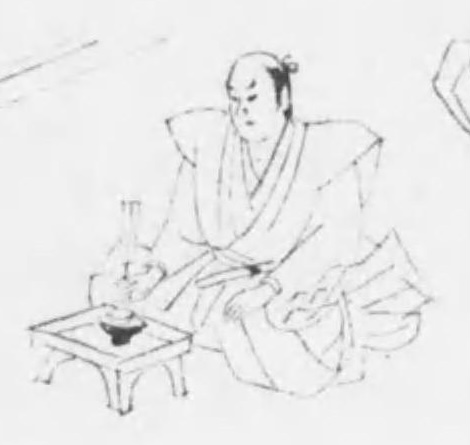
- Illustration from Haruo Satō's Arima Harunobu (1943)

Head of Hizen-Arima clan
- In office 1612–1641
- Preceded by: Arima Harunobu
- Succeeded by: Arima Yasuzumi

Daimyo of Shimabara
- In office 1612–1614
- Preceded by: Arima Harunobu
- Succeeded by: Matsukura Shigemasa

Personal details
- Born: 1586 Shimabara, Japan
- Died: June 3, 1641 (aged 54–55) Osaka, Japan

Military service
- Battles/wars: Sekigahara campaign (1600); Shimabara Rebellion (1637)

Arima Naozumi (有馬 直純; 1586 – June 3, 1641) was a Japanese samurai lord who was daimyo of Shimabara Domain and head of the Hizen-Arima clan.

== Biography ==
Naozumi was born at Hinoe Castle in Shimabara, in 1586, the first son of daimyo Arima Harunobu, who was a Christian. He was baptized as Miguel (ミゲル). He was sent by his father to work beside Tokugawa Ieyasu at the age of 15.

In 1600, Harunobu participated in Sekigahara campaign by sending Naozumi to aid Katō Kiyomasa attacking.

He married Konishi Yukinaga's niece Marta (マルタ); however, in order to curry favor with Ieyasu, he divorced his Christian wife and married Ieyasu's adopted daughter Kuni-hime in 1610.

In 1612, he inherited his father's land, which was valued at 40,000 koku, in Shimabara when his father was executed for his role in the Okamoto Daihachi incident. Tokugawa Ieyasu ordered a general persecution of all Christians in Japan, and Naozumi immediately gave up his Christian belief, exiled his former wife, and secretly killed his two half-brothers: the 8-year-old Francisco (フランシスコ) and the 6-year-old Mathias (マティアス).

However, he was dissatisfied with the constant revolts and chaos as a result of the Christian persecution and asked the Shogunate to transfer him to Nobeoka in Hyūga Province. When the Shimabara Rebellion broke out in his old fief in 1637, he answered the call of the shogunate and led a detachment of 4,000 troops to suppress the rebellion.

He died in 1641, during his sankin-kōtai in Osaka.
