= Matsudaira Tadachika =

Japanese fudai daimyō

Matsudaira Tadachika (松平 忠周, 19 April 1661 – 1 May 1728) was a Japanese fudai daimyō of the Edo period. He was highly influential in the Tokugawa shogunate under Shōgun Ieshige.

Tadachika served as Kyoto shoshidai from 1717 through 1724. He was promoted to rōjū in 1724 when he moved from Kyoto to Edo.
