= Hizen-Arima clan =

Japanese clan; famous as Christian daimyo in the Sengoku period

Hizen-Arima 肥前有馬
- Hizen-Arima family crest (mon)
- Home province: Hizen Province
- Parent house: Fujiwara clan
- Titles: Various
- Founding year: Heian period
- Ruled until: 1873 (Abolition of the han system)

The Hizen-Arima clan (Japanese: 肥前有馬氏, Hepburn: Hizen-Arima-shi) is a Japanese samurai family. From 1695 until 1871 they ruled the Maruoka Domain as daimyo. They were appointed Viscount after the Meiji Restoration.

== History ==
The clan is called Hizen-Arima clan after its province of origin to distinguish it from other unrelated clans of the same name. The clan claimed descent from Fujiwara Sumitomo (d. 941 AD), who settled in Iyo Province after the Tengyō no Ran war. During the late Muromachi period, Arima Haruzumi was a powerful retainer of the Ashikaga shogunate and controlled the Shimabara Peninsula in northern Kyushu, and thus controlled trade between Japan and Portugal.

During the Sengoku period, Haruzumi's descendant Arima Harunobu allied with the Shimazu clan of Kagoshima against the Ryūzōji clan at the Battle of Okitanawate. This alliance won and first demonstrated the effects of cannon in the battlefield. Shortly afterwards, Toyotomi Hideyoshi invaded Kyushu and by quickly joining forces with him, the Arima were confirmed in their existing holdings.

However, after the start of the Edo period, Arima Harunobu fell from favour due to Tokugawa Ieyasu's aversion to the Kirishitan faith - the term for the Roman Catholic religion in Japan. This culminated during the Okamoto Daihachi incident, a court intrigue involving Harunobu and the Kirishitan Okamoto Paulo Daihichi. As a result, he was relieved of his offices and sentenced to die by Tokugawa Ieyasu. Although his son, Arima Naozumi was married to an adopted daughter of Tokugawa Ieyasu, at the start of the suppression of the Kirishitan religion, he was transferred from Shimabara to Nobeoka Domain (53,000 koku) in Hyūga Province in 1614. During the Shimabara Rebellion of 1637-1638, he led an army of 4000 troops against the Kirishitan rebels, many of whom were former Arima vassals.

In 1692, Arima Kiyozumi was transferred (i.e. demoted) from Nobeoka Domain to Itoigawa Domain (50,000 koku) in Echigo Province due to mismanagement of his domains which resulted in a peasant revolt. Although of almost equal kokudaka as Nobeoka, Itoigawa was a holding of lesser prestige, as it was not permitted a castle. However, in 1695, he was transferred again to Maruoka Domain in Echizen Province, which was permitted a castle. The Arima clan continued to rule Maruoka Domain until the Meiji restoration and abolition of the han system in 1871. The last daimyō of Maruoka, Arima Michizumi served as jisha-bugyō, wakadoshiyori and rōjū in the Bakumatsu period of the Tokugawa shogunate, and was made a viscount in the Meiji period kazoku peerage system.

== Clan heads ==
- Arima Haruzumi
- Arima Harunobu
- Arima Naozumi
- Arima Kiyozumi
- Arima Michizumi
