= Siege of Shimabara Castle =

1637–1638 unsuccessful siege in Japan

- Part of Shimabara Rebellion
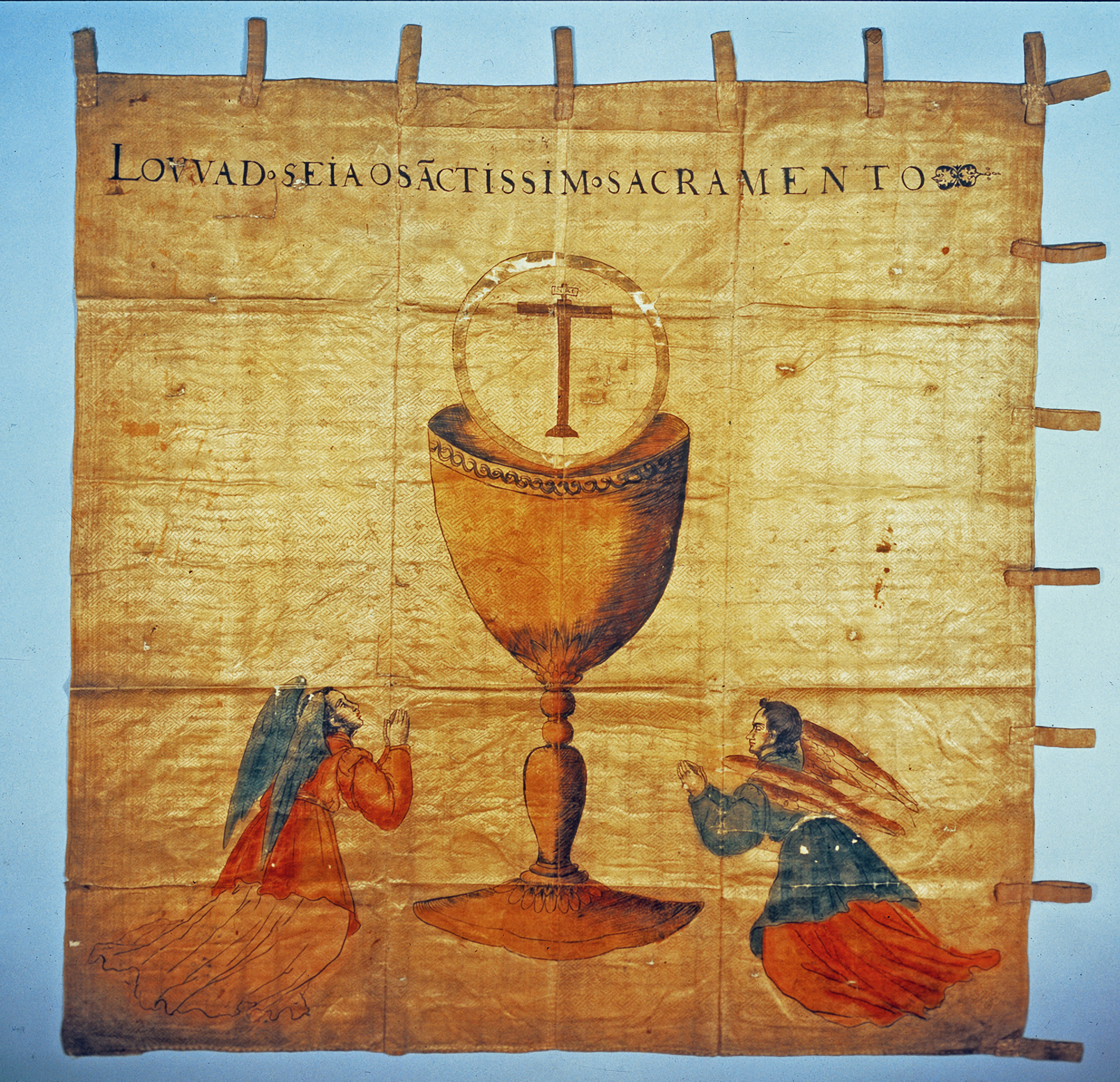
- Rebel banner
Date	12 December 1637 – 8 January 1638
Location	Shimabara Domain, Tokugawa Shogunate (present-day Nagasaki Prefecture, Japan)
Result	Shogunate victory

Belligerents
Tokugawa shogunate	Japanese Catholics and rōnin peasants

Commanders and leaders
Okamoto Shinbei	Amakusa Shiro

Strength
500	1,500–12,000

Casualties and losses
100+ killed	200+ killed

The siege of Shimabara Castle (December 12, 1637 – January 8, 1638) was an unsuccessful siege of the Shimabara Castle by rebel peasants and ronin during Shimabara Rebellion. Although the castle garrison was too weak to defend the castle town, which was completely looted and burned down, the numerically superior rebels were not able to storm the heavily fortified citadel. After a siege that lasted for 20 days, the news of an upcoming Shogunate army forced the rebel forces to retreat to the south, where they fortified themselves in the dilapidated Hara Castle.

== Prelude ==
Shimabara Domain, which occupies the peninsula of the same name on the island of Kyushu, was in 1637 the stage of the largest peasant uprising in the Japanese history. Several factors contributed to the peasant uprising in the Shimabara and Amakusa islands at the time. The first was the deposition of many local daimyos who fought on the losing side after the battle of Sekigahara (1600) by the newly established Tokugawa shogunate, including Konishi Yukinaga, the former lord of Amakusa, which left thousands of local samurai unemployed, in the position of ronin: that way, many battle hardened veterans of Korean war (1592-1598) and Sekigahara campaign were forced to live as farmers. The second was building of new Shimabara Castle, which lasted from 1614 to 1624, taking a heavy toll on the local peasants in taxes and forced labor. The third was the persecution of local Christian population, which have formed in Kyushu since 1549 (arrival of jesuit mission od Francis Xavier) and still persisted in hiding, although the Christianity was officially outlawed in 1614 on the pain of death or exile, and all the residents were regularly forced to trample the crosses and Christian relics in order to reveal themselves as Christians or publicly renounce their faith. The fourth factor, which led local peasantry to the breaking point, was the attempt by the lord of Shimabara, Matsakura Katsuie, to forcefully collect all unpaid taxes for the last seven years in autumn of 1637. Since local peasants had had seven consecutive poor harvests from 1629 to 1636, in 1637. they were on the brink of starvation. However, unpaid taxes were extorted with unusual cruelty even for Japan of that time, and women and children of peasants who could not pay were tortured to death.

After one such incident, in the end of November 1637, a riot broke out in the village of Kuchinotsu and some 700 armed peasants killed the local magistrate and burned his house. When the rebellion broke out, local Christians and ronin joined in and took the leadership positions. Official documents claim that the leaders of the rebellion were young Christian Amakusa Shiro, his father Masuda Joshitsugu, a former samurai, and another five ronin of the Konishi Yukinaga former army. By December 11, rebels gathered in several villages and killed local magistrates and tax collectors, and Okamoto Shinbei, castellan of Shimabara Castle, sent a punitive expedition to the village of Fukae, which was defeated on the way.

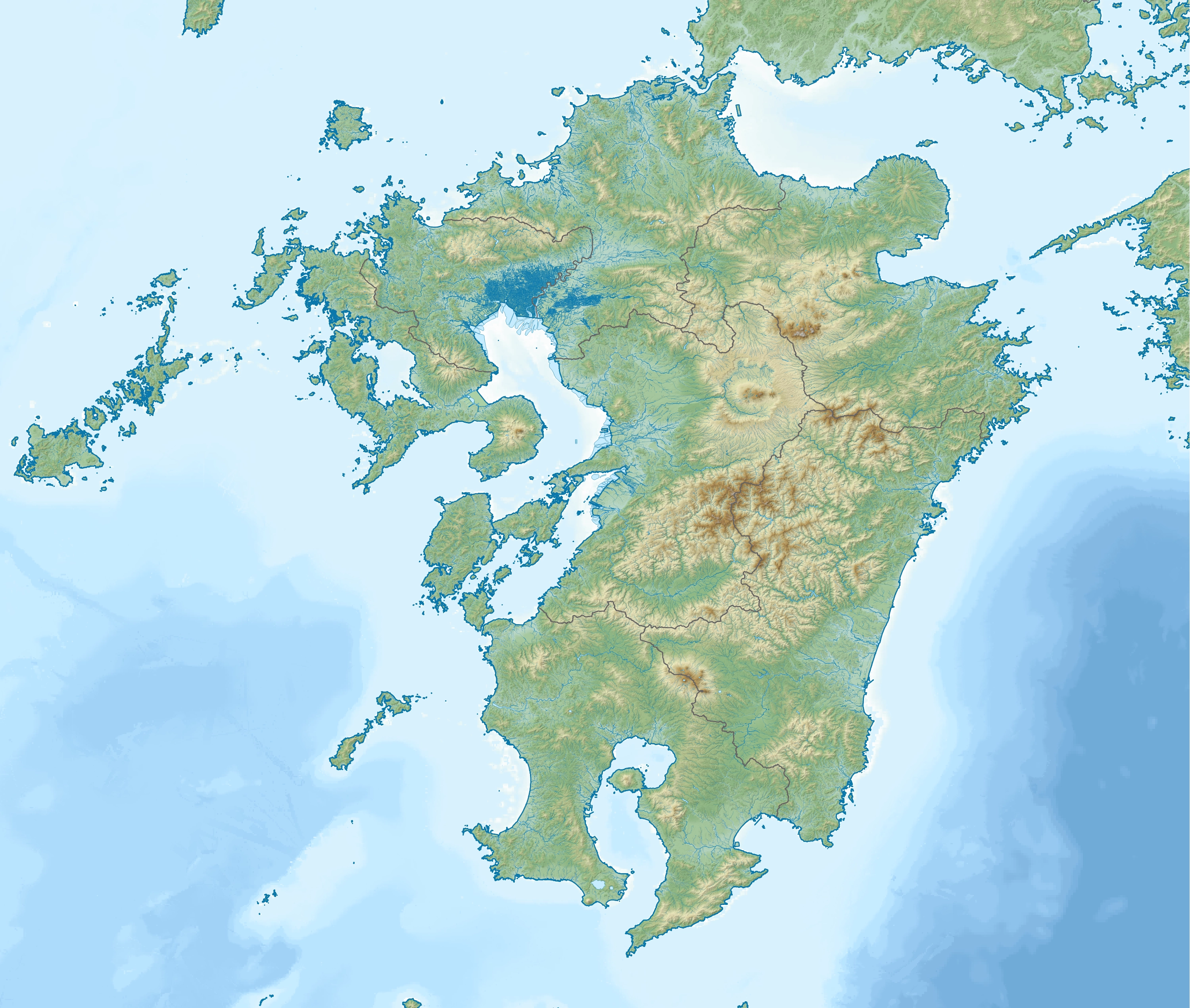
Shimabara Rebellion (1637–1638) on the map of Kyushu

== Battle ==
=== Opposing forces ===
As a lord of 60,000 koku, Matsukura Katsuie was required to keep a retinue of 600 soldiers (10 mounted samurai, 16 foot samurai, 30 pikemen, 10 archers and 20 arquebusiers for every 10,000 koku), all of them equipped with full or partial armor and swords, with at least as many servants and non-combatants. However, some of his warriors were with him in Edo, while at least 100 died in the battle of Fukae village.

As for the rebels, they started the siege with some 1500 men, but in a few days their numbers swell to 8,000, and by the end of the siege, to about 12,000 men. Most were armed with simple farming tools, but many ronin had swords, and several hundred peasants had arquebuses: although the possession of arms was illegal for non-warrior class in Japan at the time, some of the peasants had obviously kept their family swords and muskets in hiding.

=== The siege ===
After an easy victory at the Fukae Village, the rebels, whose number swelled to 1,500 fighters, pursued the fleeing Matsakura soldiers all the way to Shimabara Castle, where they lost about 200 men in a short skirmish before the gates, but forced the defenders behind the walls. As the castle town of Shimabara was too large and only symbolically fortified, the remaining soldiers retreated to the castle proper, leaving the town unprotected. The rebels immediately looted the suburbs (including two Buddhist temples) and besieged the citadel. On the same day, a riot broke out on the neighboring domain, in some of the villages on the Amakusa Islands, where local Christians took up arms and burned down Buddhist temples. The total number of insurgents under Shimabara Castle in a few days swell to 8,000: people who took arms were mostly starving farmers and oppressed Christians, some of them former samurai and veteran soldiers, but some of the villagers were forced to join the rebels in order to save their homes from looting and pillage. During the siege the defenders made a sally to a village north of the castle to collect supplies from the local granary: some 300 ashigaru, 100 arquebusiers and 15 samurai on horseback left the castle, but the rebels met them in battle at the granary and beat them back with more than 100 loses, thanks to the superior number of muskets. Although the castle was surrounded on land, the rebels were not able to block it from the sea, and some supplies reached the castle by boats from the villages around Nagasaki, which refused to join the rebellion. As the heavily fortified Shimabara Castle proved to be too strong to be taken by lightly armed rebels who had no armor or cannon, a part of the rebel army kept pressure on the castle while several thousands of the best armed ronin and peasants boarded hundreds of fishing ships and sailed to nearby Amakusa islands, to help the rebellion there. There they defeated the local samurai and their reinforcements from Karatsu in the battle of Hondo Castle, but failed to capture strongly defended Tomioka Castle.

As the siege of Shimabara Castle reached a stalemate, after twenty days the news arrived to the rebel camp of the massive reinforcements that were coming from Edo and nearby domains, that were numbering in the tens of thousands of professional soldiers. As they intended to take a stand at a strong defensive position, where poorly armed peasants with muskets would have a fair chance against armored samurai, and failing to take either Shimabara or Tomioka Castle, rebels decided to withdraw to the old Hara Castle, which was deserted and partly dismantled in 1614, but still possessed massive stone walls that could quickly be repaired and used for defense. Both rebel armies from Shimabara Castle and Amakusa successfully retreated to Hara Castle and joined forces there in the middle of January 1638. Lord Matsukura Katsuie arrived to Shimabara Castle on 8 January with a strong force of his retainers, with the remaining rebels fleeing in front of his army. The siege was broken, but the castle town was completely destroyed.
