= Siege of Tomioka Castle =

- Part of Shimabara Rebellion
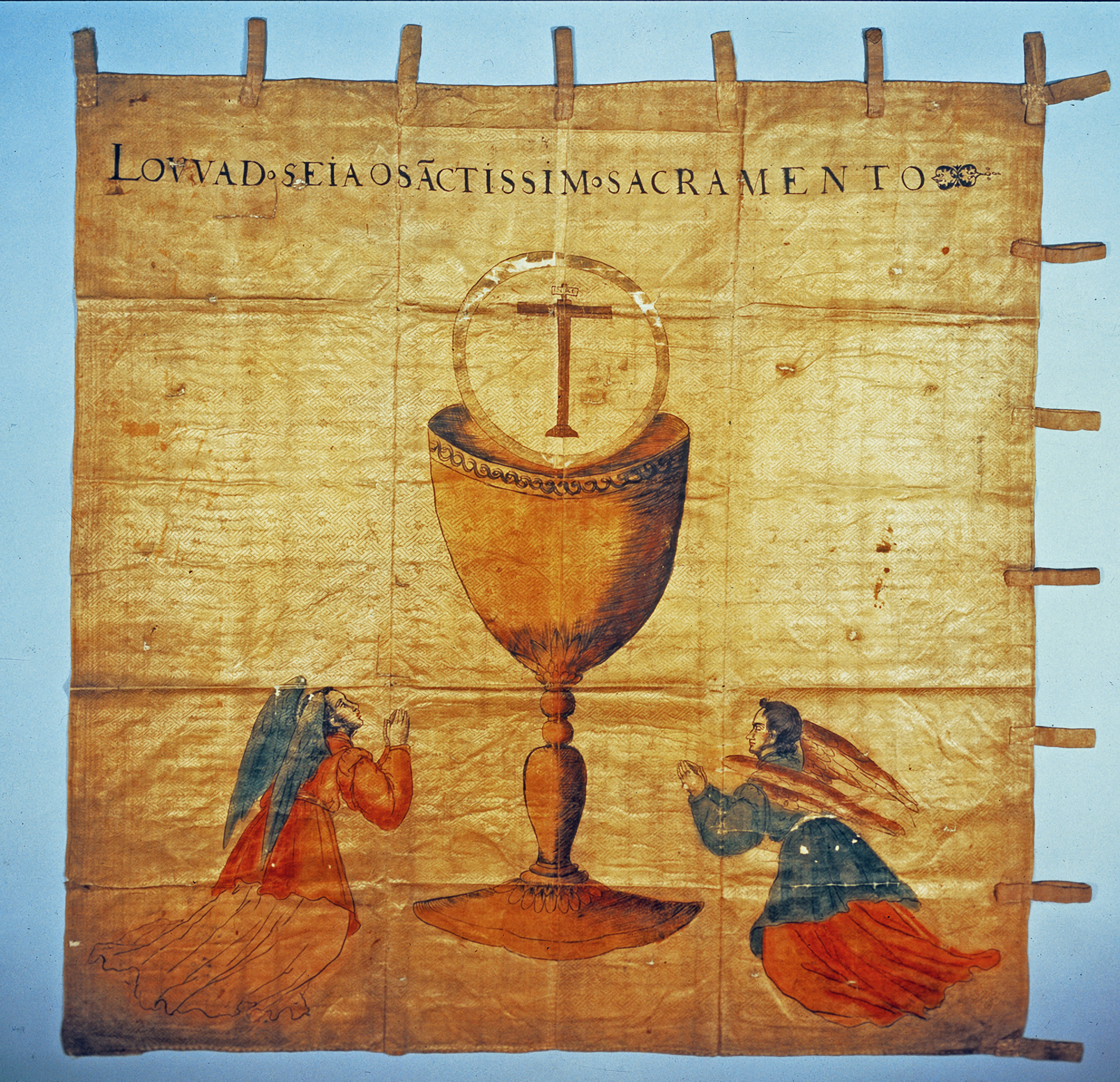
- Rebel banner.
Date	2–6 January 1638
Location	Amakusa, Tokugawa Shogunate (present-day Kumamoto Prefecture, Japan)
Result	Tokugawa victory

Belligerents
Tokugawa shogunate	Japanese Catholics and rōnin peasants

Commanders and leaders
Unknown	Amakusa Shiro

Strength
1,000	10,000

Casualties and losses
5 officers, unknown ashigaru	400

The siege of Tomioka Castle (2–6 January 1638) was a defeat of the rebel peasants and ronin during Shimabara Rebellion. After a successful uprising in Shimabara Domain, several thousand of rebels crossed the sea to the nearby Amakusa islands, domain of the Terazawa family, to help the local Christians who rose to arms at the same time. The local Terazawa samurai suffered a devastating defeat at Hondo Castle, but the survivors took refuge in Tomioka Castle, where they were able to repulse several assaults.

== Prelude ==
After the rebel victory at Hondo Castle on 29 December, Amakusa Shiro arrived the next day from Shimabara (where the main rebel army was besieging Shimabara Castle) and assumed command of the rebel army in Lower Amakusa, which swelled to some 10 thousand men.

== Battle ==
On 2 January 1638, 10 thousand rebels advanced on Shiki, a small village south of Tomioka Castle, finding it deserted and burning its small castle and the shrine to Hachiman, the Japanese god of war. In Tomioka, Terazawa soldiers have retreated to the castle proper, leaving the town to the rebels and burning the outlying buildings to deprive the attackers of any cover under the walls. As the rebels entered the town, the defenders of the castle fired their only cannon, which burst after a single shot, making it useless. In order to intimidate them, Amakusa Shiro ordered for the heads of high-ranking samurai taken at Hondo to be mounted on spikes in view of the defenders, along with a sign that read: These five people, including Miyake Tobee (the former castellan of Tomioka Castle), have been punished for being hostile to the Christians.

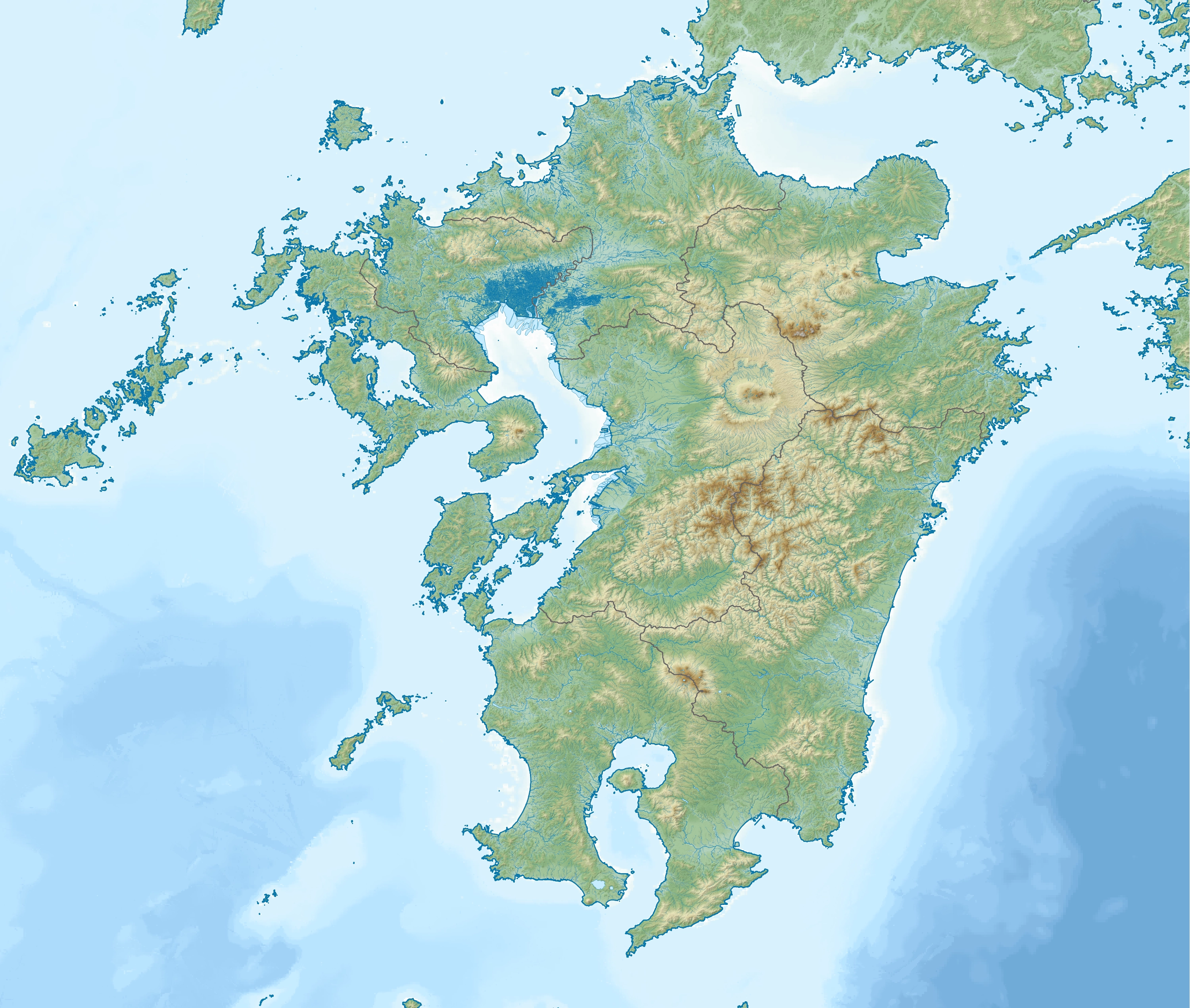
Shimabara Rebellion (1637–1638) on the map of Kyushu

Before the sunrise on 3 January, the rebels made a daring assault on the castle, chanting the name of Jesus as they advanced. One group climbed up to the high ground behind the castle, firing arrows and muskets at the castle's main turret. As the soldiers within returned fire, a second group of rebels charged the main gate, but the cleared ground in front of it gave no cover from the muskets and archers on the walls, and the rebels were forced to retreat, losing some 200 men. The day ended in stalemate, with the rebels breaching the castle gate, only to be repulsed. The defenders of Tomioka lost four of their officers, and an unrecorded number of soldiers.

The rebels spent 4 and 5 January making improvised shields to protect themselves from musket balls and arrows, using wooden doors and sliding screens taken from Tomioka town. A final attack came around 8 a.m. on 6 January, with the rebels advancing behind these new shields. Defenders lost another officer, while the rebels, pressed forward till the second wall was taken and only the inner wall remained. At that critical moment, the defenders unleashed a storm of fire-arrows on the advancing shield wall, which burst in flames: as the rebels dropped their shields, they received a volley of musket balls from close quarters, which repulsed them with heavy casualties.

== Aftermath ==
This last assault broke the resolution of the attackers, as they received the news that an Imperial Commissioner was on his way to Shimabara, assembling a great army from the western domains of Japan along the way, and they could not afford to wait for the shogunate army in the open field. So the entire rebel army took to their boats and left Amakusa for the abandoned ruin of Hara Castle, where they planned to make a final stand.
