= Battle of Hondo Castle =

1637 battle of the Shimabara Rebellion

- Part of Shimabara Rebellion
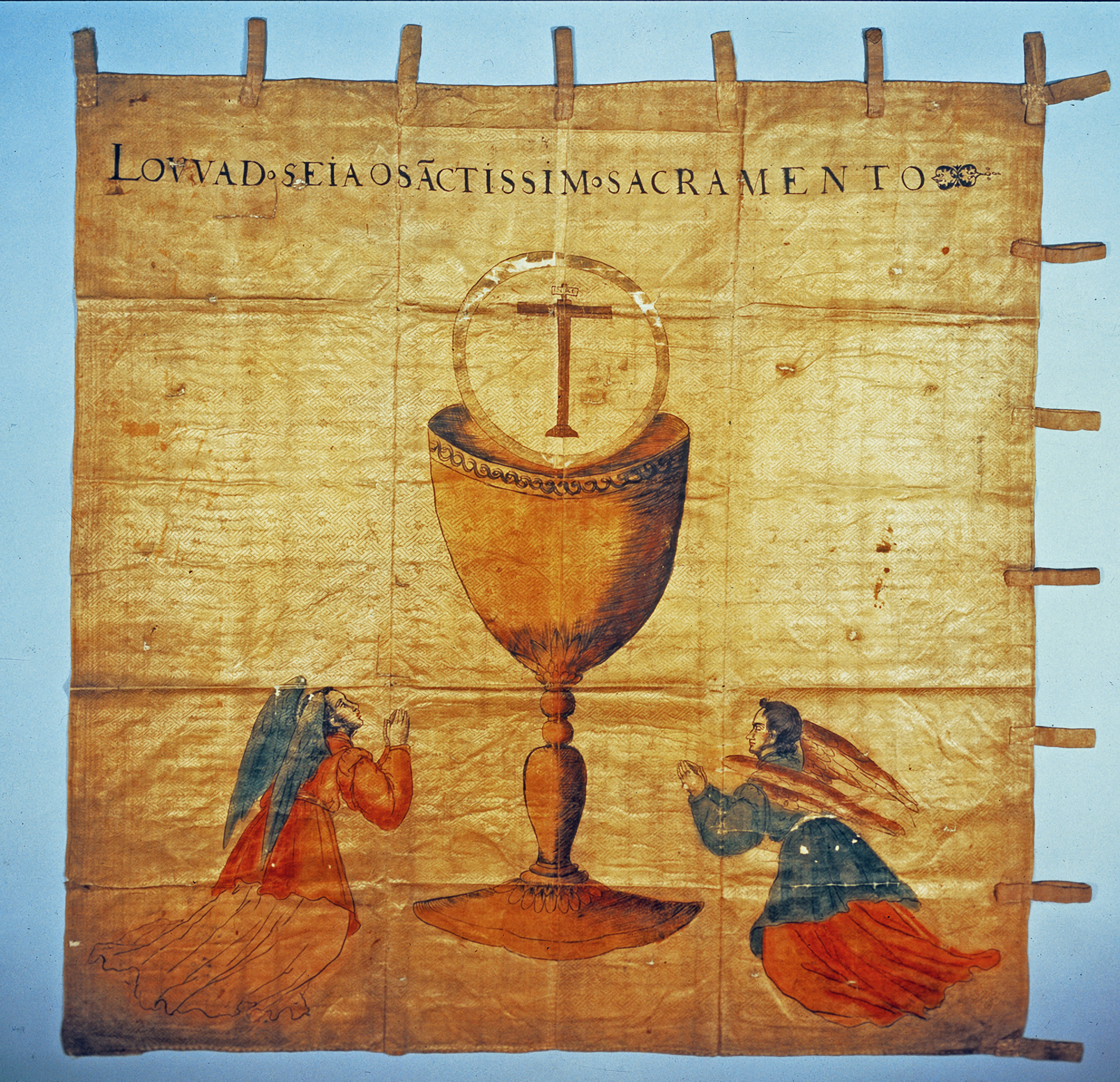
- Rebel banner
| Date | 29 December 1637 |
| Location | Amakusa, Tokugawa Shogunate (present-day Kumamoto Prefecture, Japan) |
| Result | Rebel victory |

Belligerents
| Tokugawa shogunate | Japanese Catholics and rōnin peasants |

Commanders and leaders
| Miyake Tobee † | Unknown |

Strength
| 1,500 | 3,000–5,000 |

Casualties and losses
| 5–12 samurai, several hundred ashigaru | Light |

The Battle of Hondo Castle (December 29, 1637) was a victory for the rebel peasants and ronin during the Shimabara Rebellion. After a successful uprising in Shimabara Domain, several thousand rebels crossed the sea to the nearby Amakusa Islands, domain of the Terazawa family, to help the local Christians who rose to arms at the same time. The local Terazawa samurai, overconfident and believing they had to deal only with their own peasants, attacked the rebels on the open field and suffered terrible loses. The surviving Terazawa soldiers took refuge in Tomioka Castle, which was attacked within a few days.

== Prelude ==
In the end of November 1637, a combination of several poor harvests, violent collection of arbitrarily doubled taxes and persecution of Christianity (which existed in Kyushu since 1549, but was outlawed in 1614) among local peasants led to violent uprising of starving peasants, Christians, and ronin in the Shimabara Domain, property of the Matsukura family. The rebels were organized and led by several ronin, who were formerly in the service of Konishi Yukinaga. Under the leadership of Amakusa Shiro, a charismatic Christian youth, the rebels defeated the punitive expedition of Matsukura samurai on 12 December 1637 and besieged Shimabara Castle, capital of their domain.

At the same time, on December 12, 1637, Christian peasants rose to arms in the nearby Amakusa Islands, domain of the Terazawa family, and took Oyano, the smallest of the Amakusa Islands, burning several Buddhist temples there. Rebels of Oyano collected a small flotilla of 14 fishing boats and attacked nearby villages near Uto, in the domain of the Hosokawa family, on December 16. The rebels intended to rescue the family of Amakusa Shiro there, and spread the rebellion. However, rebels were repelled by local villagers and Hosokawa samurai, and Amakusa Shiro's relatives were imprisoned by government forces.

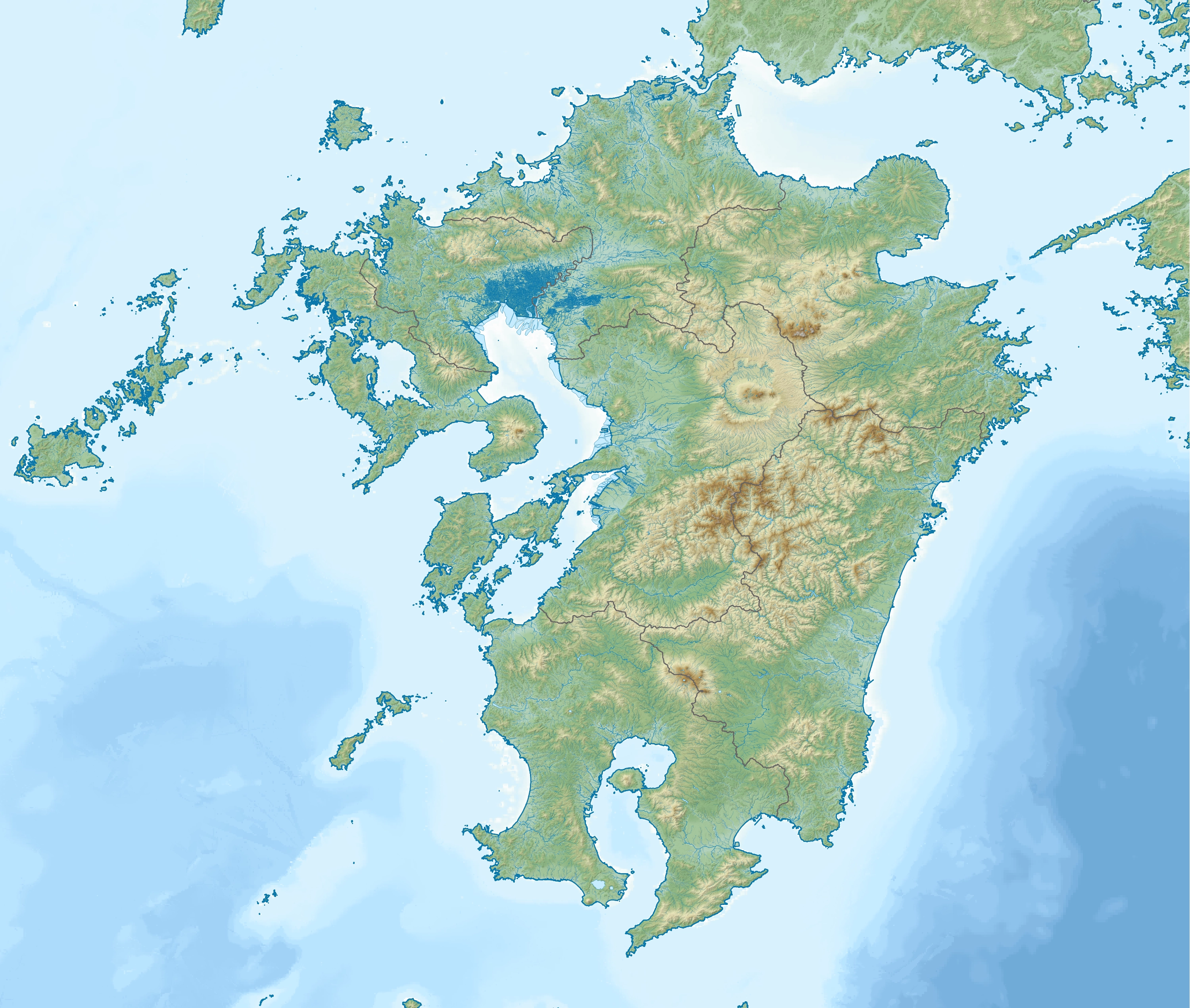
Shimabara Rebellion (1637–1638) on the map of Kyushu

== Battle ==
After he was informed of the Christian rebellion in Oyano, and with his own villagers starting to arm themselves, gather and profess their Christianity openly, Miyake Tobee, the governor of Lower Amakusa and castellan of Tomioka Castle, requested reinforcements from his superiors of the House Terazawa. In response, a fleet of 37 cargo boats with some 1500 Terazawa soldiers set sail from Karatsu (on the northern side of Kyushu) and reached Tomioka Castle on December 28. Confident in his strength, and believing that he will face only the rebels from Amakusa Islands, whose number he estimated at several hundred at most, Miyake left Tomioka Castle with his army and marched across the island to the small Hondo Castle, from where he intended to attack the rebels in the open battle. However, without his knowledge, a large army of rebels from Shimabara, numbering some 2000–6000 men, have secretly sailed from Shimabara to Lower Amakusa, carried by some 50–100 fishing boats with wooden crosses fixed to their prowls.

At dawn of 29 December, Miyake sent several hundred of his men across to Upper Amakusa, which was separated from the Lower Amakusa by a shallow strait less than 200 m (660 ft) wide. But the samurai vanguard stumbled into literally thousands of rebels and was almost completely annihilated. Around 10 am, a strong force of several thousands of rebels disembarked from their boats just north of the Hondo Castle. At the same time, another large group of rebels approached from the south-east, marching on foot across the narrow strait linking Upper Amakusa to Lower. As Hondo Castle was a little more than a fortified mansion on a hill, Miyake decided to leave the castle and attack the rebels in the open field, believing in the superiority of his men's weapons and armor, as most of the rebels were still armed with farm implements and garden tools. In order to prevent both rebel groups from joining forces, Miyake tried to destroy the southern group first, which had assembled on the southern bank of Machiyamahuchi river, with a single bridge across. However, the rebels had more than a hundred arquebuses, and managed to hold the bridge long enough for the northern group to arrive. Caught from two sides, and forced into hand-to-hand battle with the rebels several times their number, Terazawa samurai collapsed and fled. Contemporary sources cite the government losses as 5 commanders, 12 important samurai and at least several hundred footmen.

== Aftermath ==
Surviving government troops fled to Tomioka Castle, which was besieged in a couple of days. Amakusa Shiro joined the victorious rebels at Hondo on 30 December, and was welcomed as supreme leader by the rebel army. A local merchant described him as wearing a plain kimono under an embroidered white robe, with a cross painted on his forehead, a crown made of Chinese ramie grass (Boehmeria nivea) and a wand adorned with hemp and paper streamers like those used by Shinto clerics, which he used to command the forces around him.
