= Battle of Fukae Village =

1637 battle of the Shimabara Rebellion

- Part of the Shimabara Rebellion
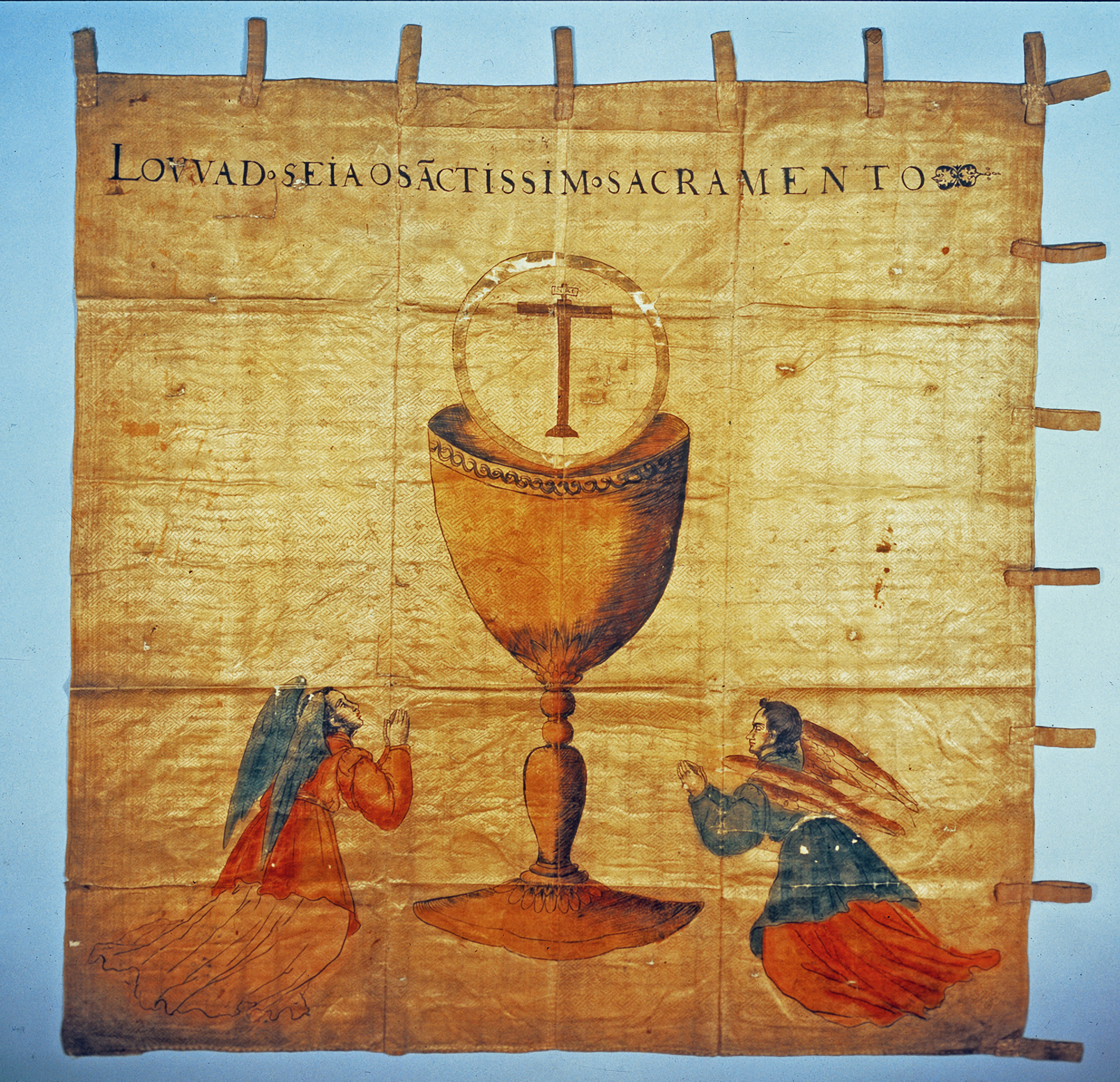
- Rebel banner
Date	12 December 1637
Location	Shimabara Domain, Tokugawa shogunate (present-day Nagasaki Prefecture, Japan)
Result	Rebel victory

Belligerents
Tokugawa shogunate	Japanese Catholics and rōnin peasants

Commanders and leaders
Matsukura Katsuie	Unknown

Strength
400	1,000

Casualties and losses
100+ killed	20+ killed

The 12 December 1637 Battle of Fukae Village was the first recorded engagement of the Shimabara Rebellion in Japan. The battle was an early rebel victory against a punitive expedition which was sent from Shimabara Castle.

== Prelude ==
=== Christianity in Japan ===
The Portuguese, the first European traders, arrived in Japan in 1543. The first Christian missionaries, Jesuits led by Francis Xavier, came as early as 1549. To encourage trade with the Europeans, who brought luxury goods and firearms from India, some feudal lords in southwestern Japan permitted Christian missionaries and the construction of Catholic churches on their estates. As early as 1574, Lord Bartolomeo Omura of Nagasaki converted to Christianity with 60,000 of his subjects (under threat of exile) and burned the local Buddhist temples. In 1580, the Arima family (who ruled the nearby Shimabara Peninsula) also converted to Christianity. Omura donated Nagasaki to the Catholic Church, making Nagasaki a semi-independent Jesuit Japanese colony. In 1582, on the west coast of Kyushu, nobleman Otomo Sorin converted to Christianity and the Christian nobles of Kyushu sent a delegation of young Japanese Christians to the pope. The delegation, which sailed halfway around the world, was formally received at the court of King Philip II of Spain and by Pope Sixtus V. As early as 1585, Nagasaki, Shimabara and the nearby Amakusa Islands had 150,000 Christians, 200 Catholic churches and 85 priests; a seminary in Shimabara had 100 students. In 1590, a delegation from Europe returned to Japan and brought the first printing press. It was installed on the Amakusa Islands from 1591 to 1597, and in Nagasaki from 1597 to 1606 .

By the end of the 16th century, the number of Christians in Japan – from peasants to entire aristocratic families – reached almost half a million and were primarily concentrated on the island of Kyushu. Further north, Christianity encountered determined and organized resistance from Buddhist monasteries, clergy, and adherents.

=== Prohibition of Christianity in 1614 ===
The unification of Japan under Toyotomi Hideyoshi brought about new resistance to the spread of Christianity, and Hideyoshi's 1587 edict condemned the Christian destruction of Buddhist temples. In 1592, he began an invasion of Korea in which the Christian lords from Kyushu were led by Konishi Yukinaga. Yukinaga, lord of the Amakusa Islands and also known by the Christian name of Augustine Konishi, was placed (accidentally or intentionally) in the vanguard of the main army and suffered the heaviest losses. The open persecution of Christians began in 1596 when the Spanish galleon San Filipe, carrying silk from Manila, ran aground on the coast of Shikoku Island. Hideyoshi's samurai seized the ship's cargo, and the Spanish sailors threatened the Japanese with the armada commanded by the Spanish king. Recognizing the threat of a Spanish invasion, Hideyoshi declared all foreign missionaries spies. In 1597 in Nagasaki, he ordered 26 Christians (six Franciscans, three Jesuits and 17 Japanese converts) to be crucified to intimidate the rest into giving up their faith. Hideyoshi died in 1598, and the new government ended the persecution of Christians. In a civil war culminating in the Battle of Sekigahara (1600), however, Christian lords from western Japan fought for the defeated Western Army; Yukinaga, the most significant Christian magnate, and Ishida Mitsunari were executed following the battle.

After establishing a new shogunate, Tokugawa Ieyasu ordered all samurai and nobles to denounce Christianity and revert to Buddhism. One prominent figure who acted on this decree was Lord Sancho Omura, son of Bartolomeo Omura. By 1606, Sancho wrested control of Nagasaki from the Jesuits and formally renounced Christianity; the remaining Christian lords on the island of Kyushu also returned to Buddhism. A generation after the Battle of Sekigahara, Christianity was a forbidden religion practiced in secrecy and all residents were required to register at their local Buddhist temple. If anyone was suspected of maintaining Christian beliefs, government officials would force them to trample on crosses and desecrate Christian relics in a public renunciation of their faith.

The former possessions of Augustine Konishi were divided among the new masters: those on Kyushu to the Hosokawa family (who renounced Christianity), and the Amakusa Islands to the Terazawa family. All Christian samurai were forced to sign a renunciation of their faith under threat of exile and the confiscation of their possessions. After the 1614 arrival of a delegation from the Catholic Philippines which offered to establish trade and diplomatic relations, new shogun Tokugawa Hidetada issued an edict on February 1, 1614, which officially banned Christianity in Japan, expelled all Christians and Europeans from the country (including the children of mixed marriages) except the Dutch – who, as Protestants, were happy to desecrate Catholic shrines and were not therefore considered Christians by the Japanese – and ordered harsher persecution of, and searches for, hidden Christians in Japan.

=== Situation in Shimabara ===
A few Christians left Japan; an even smaller number openly refused to submit and were punished by death, primarily by crucifixion. The example of these Japanese martyrs encouraged a number of others, who kept their faith in secret. Lord of Shimabara Mihail Arima tried to preserve his domain by renouncing his Christian faith, but he was exiled and his estates were given to Matsukura Shigemasa. In other regions, authorities also persistently searched for and punished hidden Christians; fifty-five Christians were crucified in Nagasaki in June 1622, and many Jesuit books were burned.

The shogun gave Matsukura two tasks: to build a new castle, and eradicate hidden Christians on his estates. At enormous expense (borne by the local peasants, many of whom were former samurai of the Arima family who had lost their positions), the new Shimabara Castle was completed in 1624; the previous seat of the estate, Hara Mountain Castle on the seashore, was abandoned and partially demolished. During the castle's construction, taxes on rice were greatly increased and were cruelly collected; peasants who did not pay the tax were burned at the stake, and their wives and daughters were hung naked by their feet. When Matsukura visited new shogun Tokugawa Yemitsu in 1624, however, he was severely reprimanded for not eradicating Christians from his estates and was threatened with their confiscation. Immediately after returning from the shogun, Matsukura ordered all Christians in Shimabara to identify themselves. Of those people who reported, about 150 were branded, mutilated by cutting off their fingers and exiled; about 80 (including four samurai) were executed by crucifixion, burning, or being thrown into the hot, volcanic springs of Mount Unzan after public torture intended to coerce hidden Christians to renounce their faith. Some Christians, especially in the cities, did so; in the villages, most remained steadfast and retreated into secrecy. In 1529, Matsukura was invited by the local authorities to persecute Christians in neighboring Nagasaki as well. On the way back, he died of a stroke or was killed in a bathtub by his enemies.

Shigemasa was succeeded by his inexperienced 27-year-old son, Matsukura Katsuie, who was even more cruel and greedy than his father. Shimabara Domain was officially valued at 60,000 koku a year, but the young Matsukura raised the value of his estate to 120,000 koku; this doubled the already-heavy taxes, to as much as 60 percent of the yield from the peasants. For non-payment of taxes, Matsukura's men tortured the debtors' wives and children. Harvests from 1629 to 1636 were poor, and the peasants in Shimabara and the surrounding estates were starving. In 1637, however, Matsukura decided to collect all back taxes for the preceding seven years without mercy.

=== Rebellion ===
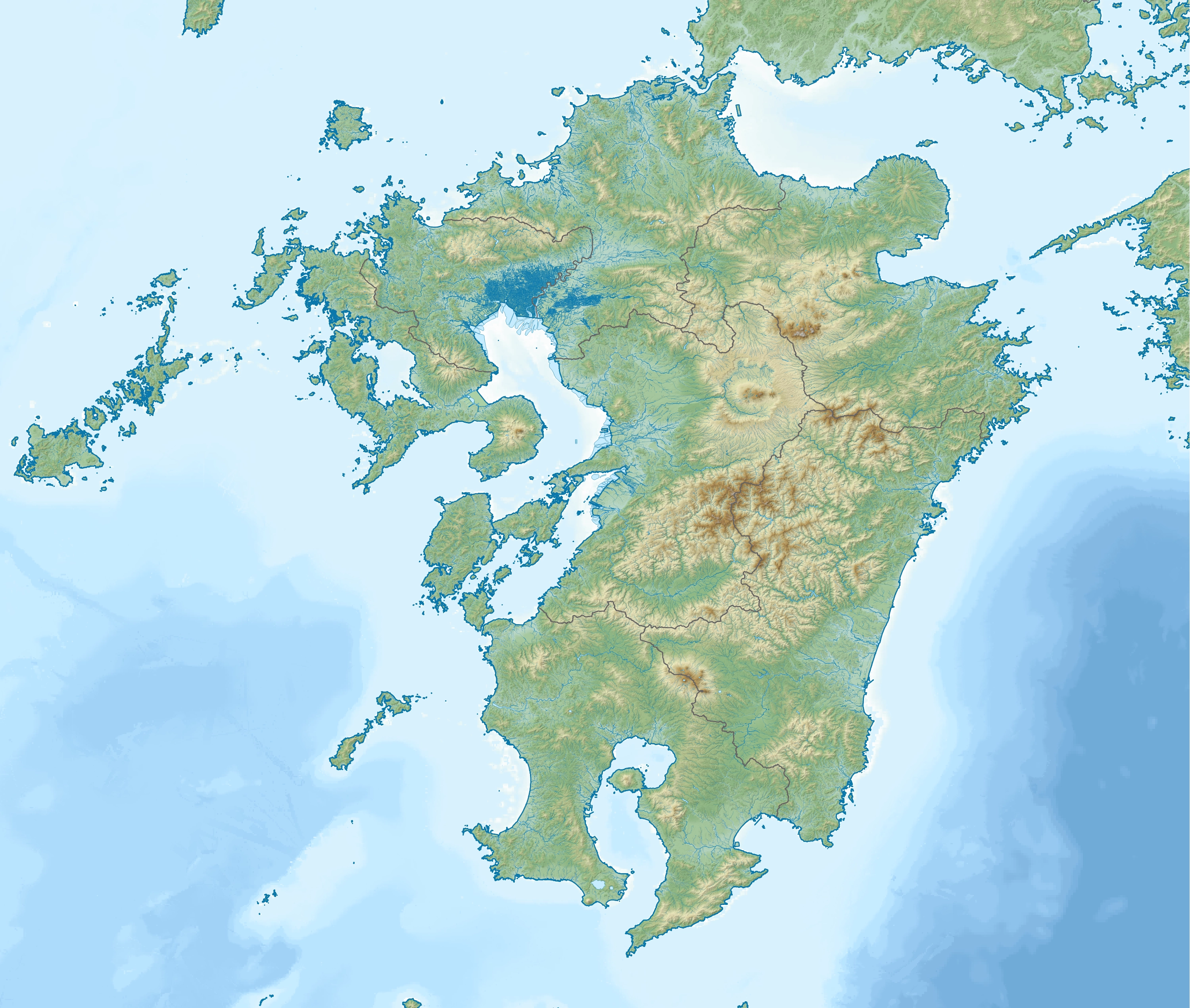
Shimabara Rebellion (1637-1638) on the map of Kyushu.

The attempt by Matsukura's tax collectors in the fall of 1637 to collect back taxes for seven lean years brought the Shimabara peasantry to the breaking point. According to contemporary chronicles, the rebellion was started by the Christian rōnin Peter Masuda (Masuda Yoshitsugu), a former samurai of Konishi Yukinaga, who was originally from the island of Oyano in the Amakusa archipelago and often visited his homeland but later lived in the village near Uto Castle, working as a farmer and a village elder, and five other rōnin from Konishi's former army. Masuda's fifteen-year-old son Jeronim, known throughout the region for his wisdom, was the formal leader of the rebellion. Authorities later said that they had misled and startled the common people on the Shimabara estate.

The first act of rebellion began in the south of the Shimabara peninsula, in the village of Kuchinotsu, opposite the Amakusa archipelago. At the end of November 1637, the local tax collector arrested the pregnant daughter-in-law of the village chief and tortured her to death. In response, her father-in-law and her father (who was from the neighbouring estate of Amakusa) rose to arms with about 700 peasants (a significant part of them veterans from the wars with Korea and the Battle of Sekigahara). They burned the tax collector's house. In their later reports to the shogun, Matsukura's officials emphasised the role of Christians in the rebellion to cover up their abuses and violence against the peasants. However, most sources believe that it was primarily an uprising of oppressed and starving peasants against feudal tyranny. The uprising soon engulfed the villages in the Shimabara Domain. On the neighbouring domain (the Amakusa Islands), the five rōnin who led groups of insurgents chose the young Christian preacher Jeronimo Amakusa (Amakusa Shiro, son of a veteran who organized the uprising) as their leader. The only other insurgent leader confirmed in historical documents was Yamada Emonsaku (born around 1580), a former samurai, a Christian, and a sign-painter in the village where the rebellion began.

== Battle ==
Matsukura Katsuie was in Edo and his castellan, Okamoto Shinbei (who remained in charge of the estate), reacted slowly. On the evening of 11 December, news of the rebellion and the killing of village officials reached Shimabara Castle; while trying to remove a Christian icon from a wall, a local official was allegedly killed by a crowd of rebels who had gathered in the village of Fukae. The castellan sent a detachment of 300 infantrymen, 80 gunners, and 15 samurai on horseback against them. Expecting an easy victory over the peasants, Matsukura's samurai were attacked on the road at dawn on 12 December by over 1,000 rebels. Many were veterans of previous wars, and some carried arquebuses. Many rebels were dressed in white, with crosses drawn on their foreheads, and attacked with the battle cry "Santiago" (imitating the Portuguese). After a brief fight, Matsukura's squad fled; they lost 100 infantrymen and five or six samurai. The rebels had about 20 dead.

== Aftermath ==
Emboldened by the influx of new groups, the rebels (whose number had grown to 1,500) pursued their opponents to the gates of Shimabara Castle. They lost about 200 men in a short skirmish, but burned and looted the suburbs (including Buddhist temples) and besieged the castle. That day, a riot broke out in the villages on the Amakusa Islands, where the Christians took up arms and burned down Buddhist temples. The number of insurgents swelled to 8,000 in a few days, since many peasants were forced to join them to keep the rebels from burning their homes.
