= Siege of Hara Castle =

1638 battle of the Shimabara Rebellion

- Part of Shimabara Rebellion
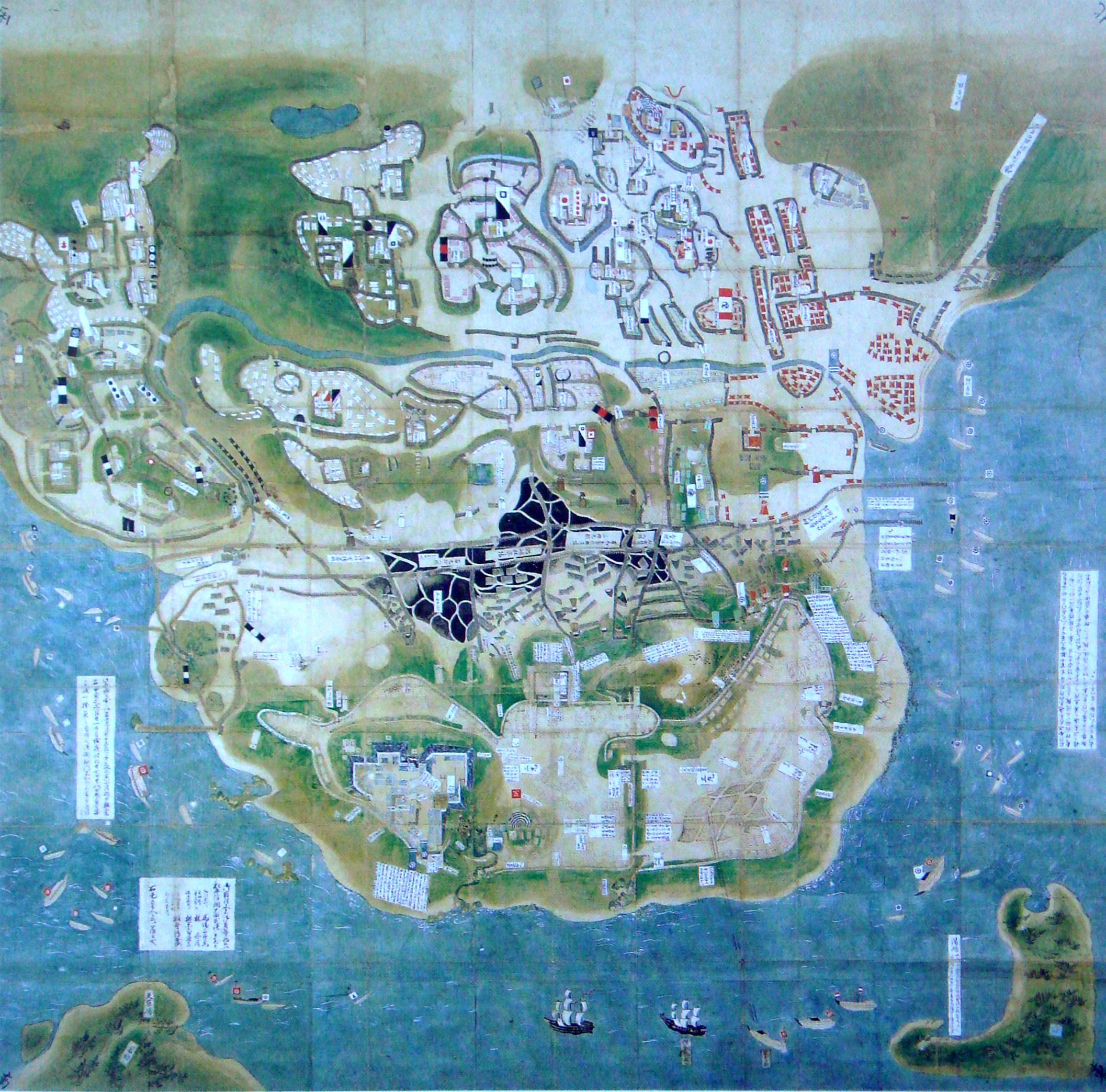
Date	22 January – 11 April 1638
Location	Shimabara Domain, Tokugawa shogunate (present-day Nagasaki Prefecture, Japan)
Result	Shogunate victory

Belligerents
Tokugawa shogunate Dutch East India Company	Japanese Catholics and rōnin peasants

Commanders and leaders
Itakura Shigemasa †; Matsudaira Nobutsuna; Nicholas Couckebacker	Amakusa Shiro †; Masuda Yoshitsugu †; Yamada Emonsaku (surrendered)

Strength
125,000	12,000 fighters

Casualties and losses
20,000 killed and wounded	20,000–38,000 killed (including civilians)

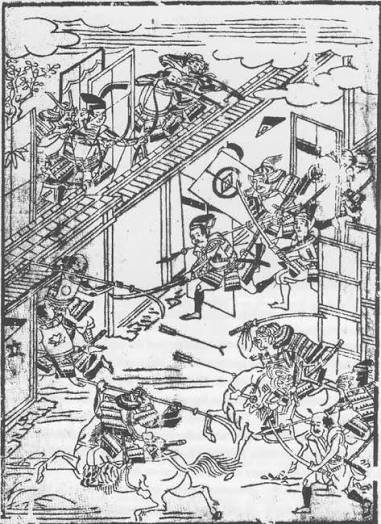
The siege of Hara Castle from the Shimabara-ki, 1640

The siege of Hara Castle (22 January – 11 April 1638) was the final battle of the Shimabara Rebellion. The news of an upcoming Shogunate army forced the rebel forces to retreat to the south, where they fortified themselves in the dilapidated Hara Castle and withstood a two-month siege, inflicting heavy casualties on the government troops.

== Prelude ==
After the failed sieges of Shimabara Castle (12 December 1637 – 8 January 1638) and Tomioka Castle (2–6 January 1638), in the middle of January 1638. the rebels retreated to the abandoned Hara Castle on the south-eastern coast of Shimabara, seeking a fortified position from where they could make a stand against the approaching government troops. Hara Castle was abandoned and mostly dismantled in 1614, with no remaining buildings, towers or living quarters, but it still had its massive stone walls around the citadel, and several thousands of rebel workers have quickly made another defensive line, digging a moat, building an outer wall of clay and cutting the nearby bamboo forests to build palisades and watchtowers. The rebel fleet that came from Amakusa was dismantled for building material, and many wooden crosses from the prowls were mounted along the castle walls. The castle was also a natural fortress by itself: surrounded on three sides with steep cliffs and the sea, it could be reached only on the west side, which was half a mile wide marshland that would become unpassable during the high tide.

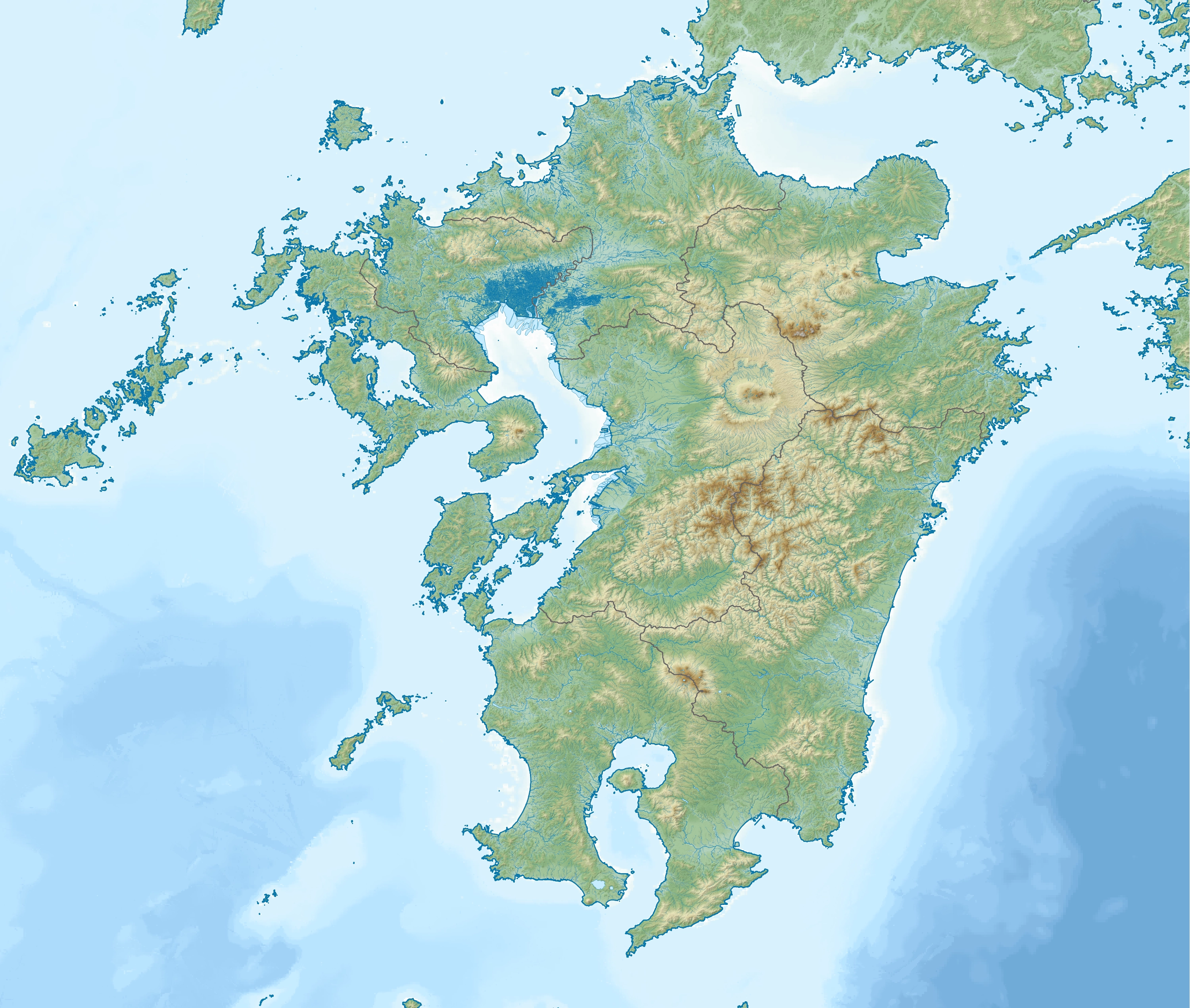
Shimabara Rebellion (1637–1638) on the map of Kyushu

== The siege ==
=== Futile assaults ===
The government forces from nearby domains entered the Shimabara Domain and Amakusa in the first week of January 1638, finding deserted villages and towns along the way, as the entire peasant population has retreated to the Hara Castle. Little more than 100 rebels were captured by Hosokawa troops on Amakusa, and the government forces burned the deserted homes and villages.

The appointed commander of the government army, which reached Hara Castle on January 22, was Itakura Shigemasa, an old shogunate official with little military experience. Although he had orders from shogun Tokugawa Iemitsu to avoid unnecessary losses and simply starve the rebels into submission, after ten days of waiting he lost his patience and ordered a general assault on February 3, with 13,000 men attacking western wall as a diversion, while another 5,000 attacked the northern side of the castle. However, the defenders had some 500 bowmen and 800 arquebuses, as well as some catapults on the earthen walls, and even the women were boiling water and cast it upon attackers. The assault was beaten back with ease, attackers losing more than 600 men in a couple of hours, while the defenders appeared to suffer no significant losses.

The news of Itakura's failed attack and heavy losses soon reached shogun Iemitsu in Edo, and he was informed by his relatives in the capital that another general was on the way to relieve him of duty. To save face, Itakura Shigemasa personally led another assault on February 14, but died under the walls together with many of his men.

=== The waiting game ===
Soon after Itakura's demise, four new divisions led by the new commander, Matsudaira Nobutsuna, came to reinforce the besiegers of Hara Castle. Matsudaira also had little military experience, but had firmly decided to obey the shogun's orders to the letter and starve the rebels into submission. He calculated that, as Hara Castle had been readied in haste, it could not have provisions of food for more than one or two months. Soon after arrival, Matsudaira received an arrow-letter from the rebels, signed by Amakusa Shiro, which explained their grievances against lord Matsukura as the sole cause of the rebellion, and appealing to the shogun's envoy for justice, as a higher authority than lord Matsukura.

=== Dutch intervention ===
However, on 13 January, even before he arrived at Hara Castle, Itakura Shigemasa requested some gunpowder from the Dutch trading post in Hirado, which was very slow to respond. On the news of Itakura's two failed assaults in battle on February 14, the governor of Nagasaki requested that the Dutch offer their support to the government forces at Hara Castle, on pain of losing their trade rights. In response, the Dutch sent to Hara five naval cannons and six barrels of gunpowder by land, and their ship Rijp sailed to Hara Castle on 24 February, welcomed by general Matsudaira. Dutch captain Nicholas Couckebacker, whose letters are an important source of information on the Shimabara rebellion, inspected the Hara Castle and concluded that his guns were too small to breach the walls, as the outer parapets were cast of solid clay and the upper fortress had a wall built of heavy stones. However, general Matsudaira ordered the Dutch to bombard the castle anyway, as artillery could provide cover for his sappers who were building siege works, getting closer to the walls each day. Dutch cannons from the ship and land batteries (as many as 15 cannons were unloaded and set along the siege lines) kept bombarding Hara Castle from 25 February until March 12, when they were honorably discharged by lord Matsudaira himself after one of the Dutch gunners was killed. Although they could not breach the walls, they burned several food stores and huts inside the castle. However, the most likely reason for their dismissal was a growing sense of shame among the Japanese commanders for seeking foreign military aid against common peasants.

=== Dissent among the rebels ===
Yamada Emonsaku, the painter and Christian renegade, from the outset had served as one of Amakusa Shirō's chief captains and also as the "war artist" of Hara Castle, being the likely creator of Amakusa's battle standard that still exists. Soon after the siege began, Yamada was realist enough to see that the situation was hopeless. Having decided to communicate secretly with the attackers, on March 5 he shot the following letter into the enemy camp:

Yamada Emonsaku addresses you with true reverence and respect. I desire to obtain your forgiveness, and restore tranquillity to the empire, by delivering up Amakusa Shirō and his followers to be punished. We find that, in ancient times, famous rulers ruled beneficently, proportioning their rewards to the merit of the receiver, and the punishments to the demerit of the offender. When they departed from this course, for any purpose so ever, they were unable to keep the control of their countries. This has been the case with hereditary lords; how much more will it be the case with villagers who rebel against the Government. How will they escape the judgement of Heaven? I have revolved these truths in my mind, and imparted them to the eight hundred men under my command. These men, from the first, were not sincere Christians; but when the conspiracy first broke out they were beset by a great multitude and compelled to support the cause. These eight hundred men all have a sincere respect for the [samurai] class. Therefore speedily attack the castle, and we having received your answer, without fail, as to time, will make a show of resisting you, but will set fire to the houses in the castle, and escape to your camp. Only I will run to the house of [Amakusa Shirō] and make as if all were lost; and having induced him to embark with me in a small boat, will take him alive, bring him to you, and thus manifest to you the sincerity of my intentions. For this purpose I have prepared several boats already, having revolved the matter in my mind from the time I entered the castle. Please give me your approval immediately, and I will overthrow the evil [rebels], give tranquillity to the empire, and, I trust, escape with my own life. I am extremely anxious to receive your orders. Yamada Emonsaku thus addresses you with true regard. To the commanders of the [shogunal] army.

This was a risky plan and, not surprisingly, it misfired. One of the "arrow letters" sent to Yamada from outside the castle was intercepted, and the rebels were thus alerted to his treachery. Yamada was bound up and sentenced to death. While he awaited execution, however, the castle was stormed and he was promptly rescued. Later Yamada was taken to Edo by Lord Matsudaira and safely installed in his mansion, where he served as Matsudaira's assistant. Though he had failed to deliver Amakusa Shirō to the enemy, he justified his rescue by providing Bakufu officials with the only detailed account of the uprising from the rebels' side.

=== Negotiations ===
After an attempt to blow part of the outer wall with 1800 pounds of gunpowder failed on March 15, later in the same month general Matsudaira, still hoping to avoid the immense losses that were bound to result from an all-out attack, made a few final attempts to persuade the rebels (or at least certain groups among them) to leave the castle peacefully. In an effort to induce Amakusa Shirō and his father to surrender, he ordered that Shiro's mother Martha, sister Regina and other family members who were captured in their home village near Uto in December 1637 be brought to his camp. The hostages were then forced to write letters to Shiro, begging him to surrender for their sake and promising mercy from the government (which was extremely unlikely at this point in the siege) for all the rebels who would surrender and abandon Christianity. Realizing that the emotional appeal of family hostages had proved ineffective, Lord Matsudaira next ordered that an "arrow letter" be fired into the castle proposing a cease-fire and negotiations, addressed to "the Honourable Masuda Shirō". After some difficulty a cease-fire was arranged and negotiations were held on the beach below the castle in full view of the attacking armies and of the defenders. Their positions were irreconcilable, however, and the talks broke down almost immediately.

However, by the beginning of April the rebels' provisions were almost exhausted. There had always been far too many people in the castle to feed adequately, and now the situation was critical. Deserters reported that most of the defenders were so weak that they could not stand up even while doing sentry duty, and the labour of repairing the damaged fortifications would soon be too exhausting to continue. Finally Lord Matsudaira's strategy was producing the desired results.

=== Rebel sortie ===
On the night of 4 April the defenders made on a sortie, led by Amakusa Shirō himself, and charged the besiegers' camp, inflicting heavy casualties on the government troops. Yet despite initial success the sortie miscarried; Amakusa Shirō and his men were forced to retire to the castle, leaving behind over three hundred of their own killed and wounded. When the corpses of some of the slain rebels were examined, it was found that their stomachs contained seaweed and barley, and that most of them were in an advanced stage of malnutrition. This confirmed the reports of recent prisoners and deserters that food supplies in Hara Castle had run out.

=== The fall ===
On 12 April one of the fire-signals was accidentally lit, and men of the Nabeshima division rushed forward to the assault in disregard of Matsudaira's careful plans. They were rapidly joined by the other divisions in a confused but successful attack on the outer defences, each of the daimyo forces trying to gain as much glory as possible for itself by being first into the castle. Despite fierce resistance and appalling confusion, which often led the attackers to fight among themselves, they forced their way into the outer line of defences, cutting down everyone in sight, and then steadily advanced over great mounds of corpses to invest the middle and inner defensive line. The starving defenders, having run out of ammunition, fought with stones, beams, cooking-pots, and anything else that came to hand. During two days and nights of frenzied fighting they held out against thousands of well-armed, well-fed samurai. On 14 April the defenses began to crumble. The attackers systematically set fire to the huts and trenches, and occupants were burnt to death by the hundreds. Others, including large numbers of women with their children, hurled themselves into the flames rather than be taken alive. A contemporary daimyo observer expressed in writing his admiration for these brave peasant fighters who preferred suicide to surrender, despite their low station. On 15 April the rebel defense completely stopped and the massacre of several thousand of surviving rebels, mainly wounded, women and children, began. Amakusa Shiro was discovered heavily wounded in one of burning huts and decapitated. His head was identified by his mother Marta and Yamada Emonsaku, the rebel turned traitor.

== Losses ==
Though Hara Castle fell more rapidly than anyone had expected, the attackers' losses were considerable. The final assault cost them some fifteen thousand casualties, of whom more than three thousand were killed. Estimates of the total number lost in the campaign vary considerably. Defenders were completely massacred, with estimated 10-13 thousand fighters and some 23 thousand civilians lost. The victorious samurai collected more than 18 thousand heads, but it is hard to estimate how many rebels perished in fire. The only rebels who survived the siege were Yamada Emonsaku and more than 100 of his men, who were discovered in the prisons of the castle, where they were waiting for the execution for planning to open the gates to the government troops.
