= Nicolaes Couckebacker =

Head of the Dutch trading post in Hirado

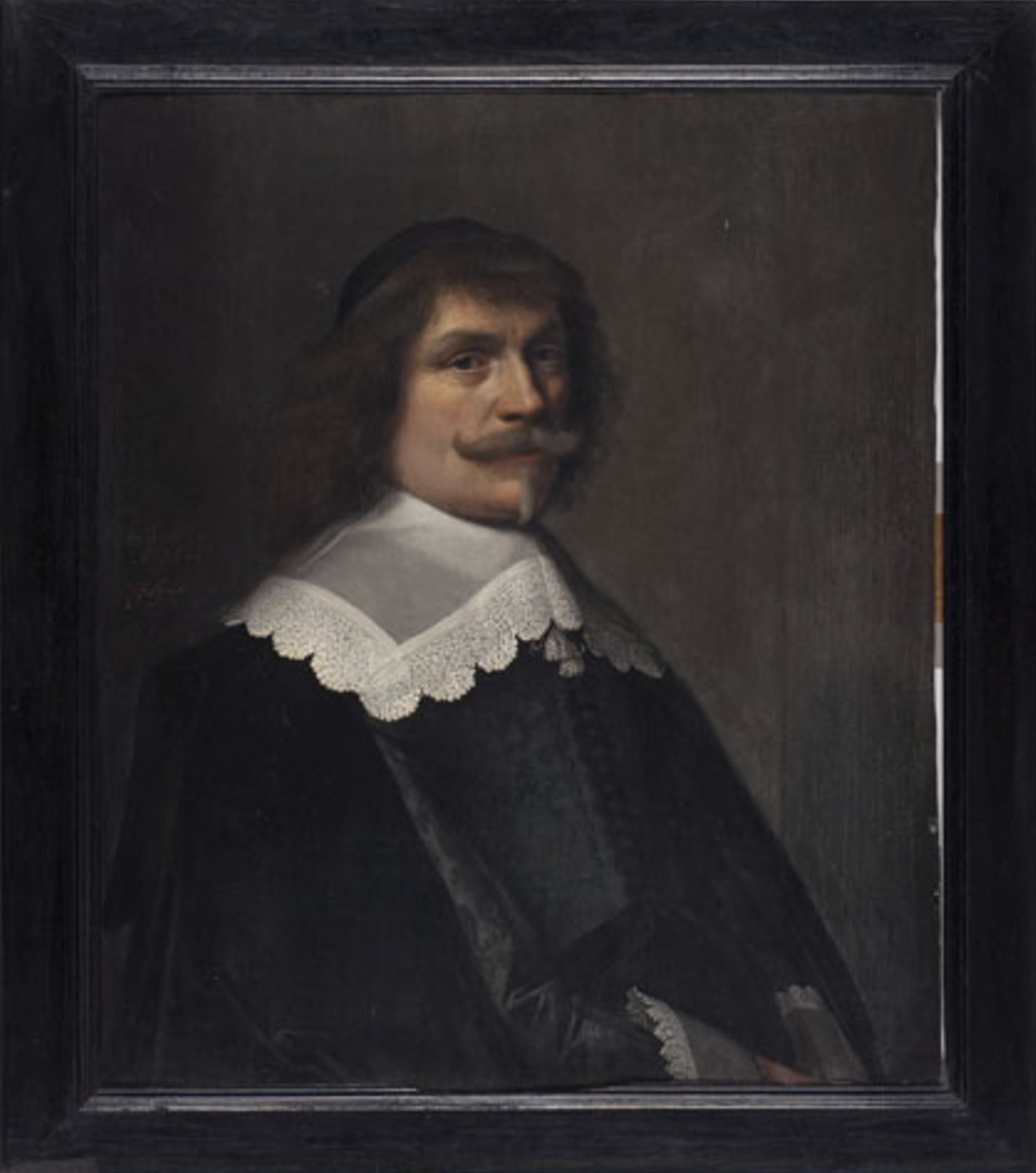
Nicolas Coeckebacker portrait painting

Nicolaes, Nicolaas, or Nicolas Coeckebacker or Couckebacker was twice Chief of the Dutch trading factory at Hirado, the Japanese trading post of the Dutch East India Company. He arrived in 1633 and stayed until fall 1635. His second stay as VOC Opperhoofd in Hirado was from 1637 till 1639.

In late 1637, during the Shimabara Rebellion, the Matsudaira clan asked Coeckebacker to assist them in destroying the Catholic rebels led by Amakusa Shirō at Shimabara. Coeckebacker bombarded the insurgents during a fortnight in their stronghold in Hara Castle from his ship De Rijp, starting on 24 February 1638. On 12 March Matsudaira Nobutsuna informed him to withdraw and thanked him for his help. Coeckebacker's participation in the assault, part of the Battle of Shimabara was, according to his own reports, both reluctant and ineffective.

In 1640, he was attempting unsuccessfully to negotiate a trade agreement with the Trịnh Lords of Vietnam. Nicolaes Couckebacker wrote a Report Concerning His Trip to Tonkin and His Inspection Tour of the Company's Comptoir in Tayouan on the Island Formosa. After his return to Holland, Coeckebacker married, and became schepen in his hometown Delft.

Coeckebacker was a close friend to François Caron, who would oversee the transfer of power to the Japanese in 1641, and who would be the first Chief in Dejima.

== See also ==
- Sakoku
- List of Westerners who visited Japan before 1868
