= Matsukura Shigemasa =

Japanese feudal lord

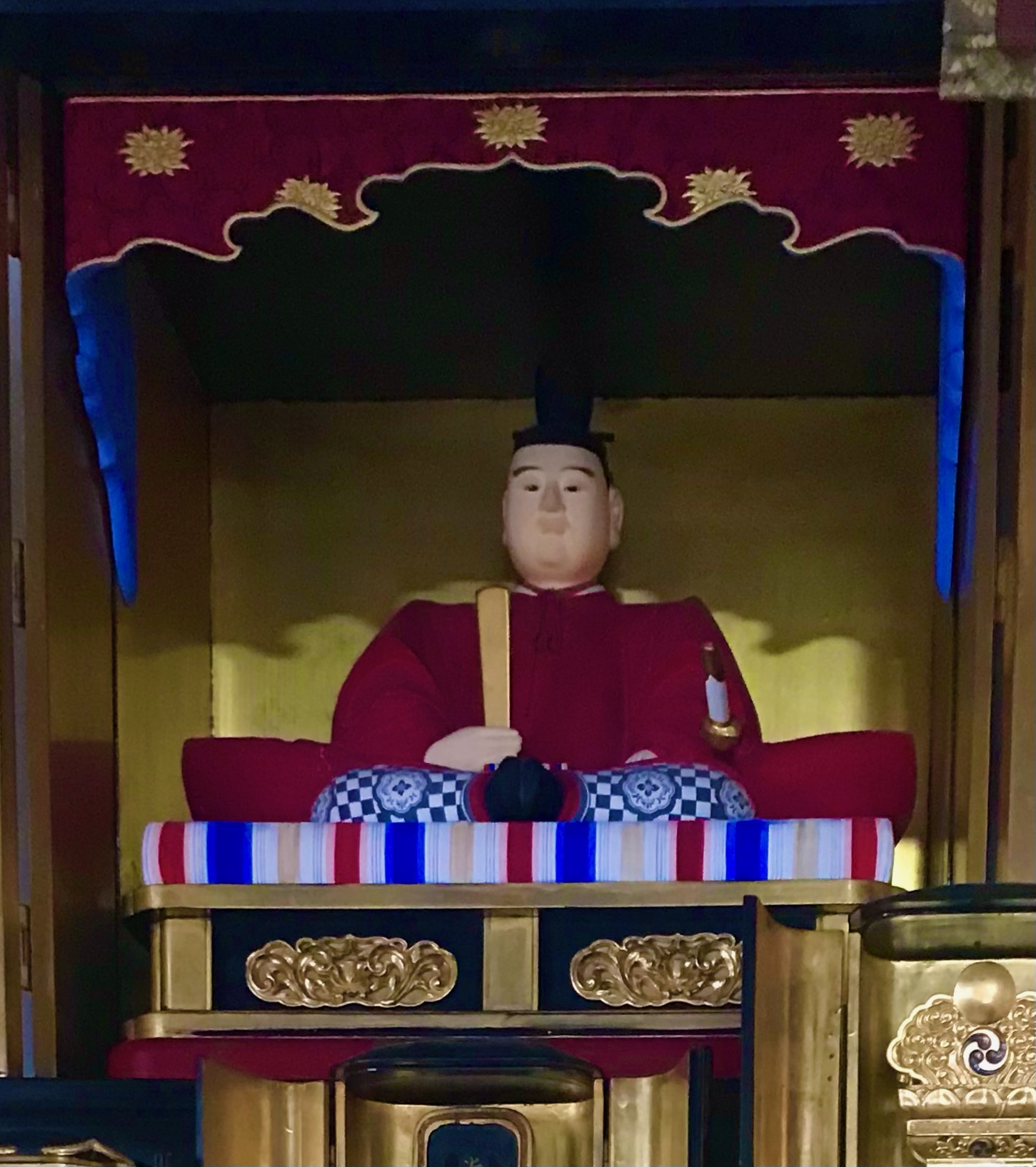
Matsukura Shigemasa

Matsukura Shigemasa (松倉 重政; 1574 – December 19, 1630) was a Japanese feudal lord of the late Sengoku and early Edo periods. He held the title of Bingo no Kami and the Imperial court rank of junior 5th, lower grade (ju-go i no ge). Though he began as a retainer of Tsutsui Sadatsugu of Yamato Province, he became a lord in his own right, acquiring the 60,000 koku Shimabara Domain in Kyushu, in 1600. He is most famous for being the lord whose domain was the center of the Shimabara Rebellion of 1638.

== Early life ==
Matsukura Shigemasa was born in 1574 in Yamato Province, the son of Matsukura Ukon Shigenobu, a retainer of the Tsutsui clan. However, following the death of Tsutsui Junkei, the Tsutsui clan was moved to Iga Province, and the Matsukura remained in Yamato, coming under the supervision of the Toyotomi clan. In 1600 he fought in the Battle of Sekigahara, and for his merits was awarded lordship of Gojo-Futami Castle by Tokugawa Ieyasu. For his meritorious actions in the Tokugawa army at the Domyoji front of the Osaka Summer Campaign, he was awarded an increase in stipend and was transferred in 1616 to Hinoe in Hizen Province, a 43,000 koku domain formerly belonging to Arima Harunobu.

== Overtaxation and persecution ==
In 1618, as per the Ikkoku-ichijō (一国一城, "One Castle Per Province") order established by the Tokugawa shogunate, Shigemasa dismantled his two castles of Hara and Hinoe, and began construction on the new Shimabara Castle (also known as the Matsutake Castle). The castle was on a scale much grander than the domain could afford and so Shigemasa taxed the commoners beyond belief, with the price of the castle construction resulting in twice the amount that the domain could reasonably afford.

In 1621, persecutions of Christians began, with mutilation and branding being practices ordered by the ever-tightening restrictions of the shogun Tokugawa Iemitsu. In Shimabara, the Matsukura clan tortured Christians by boiling them alive in the infamous Unzen Volcanic Springs, beginning in 1627. In 1629, Shigemasa approached the Nagasaki magistrate, Takenaka Danjo no Sho Shigeyoshi, and offered to do the same for all Christians in Nagasaki. Takenaka agreed.

== Plans for Luzon ==
Subsequently, Shigemasa had hopes of further hampering the safety of Christians by attacking Luzon, in the Philippines. To this end he further taxed his citizens. While the Tokugawa shogunate did not entirely approve of his iron rule, it did approve, albeit quietly, of his desire for a foreign expedition.

== Death and succession ==
Before Shigemasa could make good on his plans, he died at the Obama Hot Springs in 1630. Some believe he was poisoned by the Shogunate for having unnecessarily pushed his citizens too hard, but the truth remains unclear. The family headship was passed on to his son Matsukura Katsuie, but as Katsuie continued his father's draconian measures, the peasants and masterless samurai within the domain revolted, igniting the Shimabara Rebellion. The Matsukura family came to an end when Katsuie was beheaded by Shogunal order, and the Shogunate placed the domain under the care of Mori Nagatsugu (lord of the Tsuyama Domain of Mimasaka Province), before passing it on to the Koriki family, which was transferred in from Hamamatsu, in Tōtōmi Province.
