= Hara Castle =

Castle in Minamishimabara, Japan

- 原城
- Minamishimabara, Nagasaki Japan
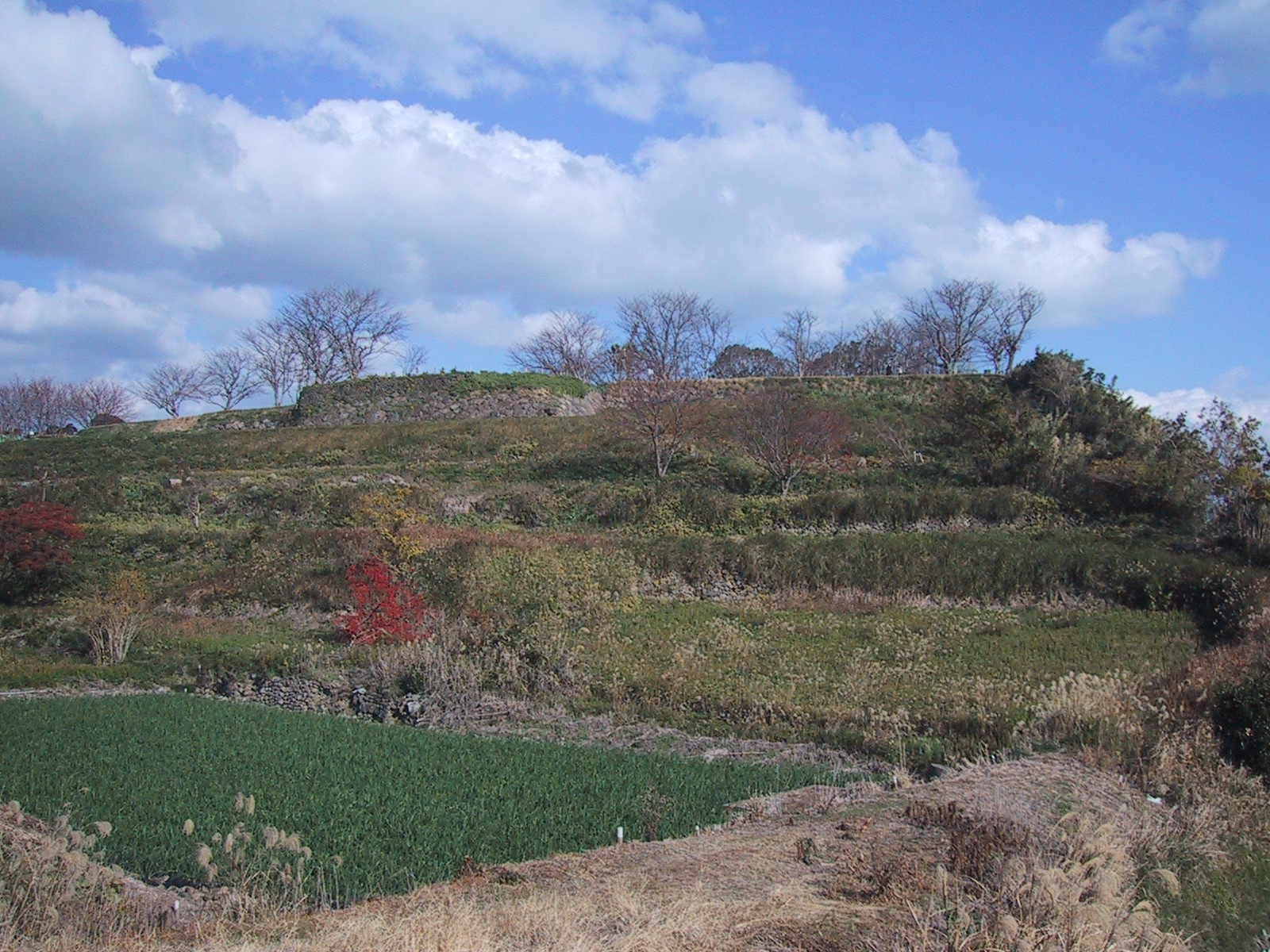
- Ruins of Hara Castle in 2004

Site information
- Type: hirayama-style Japanese castle
- Controlled by: Arima clan
- Open to the public: yes
- Condition: Archaeological and designated national historical site; castle ruins

Location
- Coordinates: 32°37′59.9″N 130°15′23.3″E

Site history
- Built: 1496
- In use: Sengoku - Edo Period
- World Heritage Site National Historic Site of Japan

The Hara Castle (原城, Hara-jō) was a Sengoku period Japanese castle cemetery located in the Minami-Arima neighbourhood of city of Minamishimabara, Nagasaki Prefecture Japan. Its ruins were designated a National Historic Site of Japan in 1938.

== Overview ==
Hara Castle is located in the southern part of the Shimabara Peninsula. It was built in 1496 by Arima Takazumi on a hill jutting out into the Ariake Sea as a subsidiary castle of Hinoe Castle. At the end of the 16th century, Arima Harunobu, who had gained knowledge of the castles of the Korean Peninsula and Hizen Nagoya Castle during the Japanese invasions of Korea (1592–1598), rebuilt the castle as his main stronghold. Jesuit records have confirmed that at least the main citadel, complete with stone walls, was built between 1599 and 1604.The work at this time transformed it into a castle of the Azuchi-Momoyama period with a tiled roof, and the main, second, third, Amakusa, and outward citadels. The stone walls, square moat, and foundations of the tenshu tower that remain today are from this renovation. After the Arima clan was transferred to Nobeoka Domain in Hyuga Province in 1616, Matsukura Shigemasa entered Hinoe Castle, but due to the influence of the "Law of One Castle per Province", he abandoned the inconvenient Hinoe Castle and built Shimabara Castle as his stronghold. At this time, Hara Castle was also abandoned, and although some the stone walls were cannibalised and some structures were relocated for the construction of Shimabara, it is believed that the stone walls and many buildings (including its massive main gate and several yagura turrets) were left behind. Therefore, during the Shimabara Rebellion from 1637 to 1638, rebels were able to successfully barricade themselves in the abandoned Hara Castle for many months against the forces of the Tokugawa shogunate. After the Shimabara Rebellion, the shogunate demolished the stone walls and other structures remaining at the site of the castle.

During various archaeological excavations on the site, the remains of rebels who either fell in battle or were executed afterwards, lead bullets, rosaries and crucifixes were unearthed. In the 2000 excavation, the remains of one of the largest castle gates in Japan were confirmed. The gate was almost a square, measuring 90 by 80 meters east to west. The foundations of the building believed to have been the residence of Amakusa Shiro was also identified. There are remains of an escape route on the Ariake Sea side of the castle, which was investigated by local historians after it collapsed in heavy rains in 1963, but it is not known whether the escape route was built when the castle was built or dug during the Shimabara Rebellion.

On April 6, 2017, the ruins of Hara Castle were selected as one of the Continued Top 100 Japanese Castles in 2017.

On June 30, 2018 Hara Castle along with 11 other sites linked to Catholic persecution in Japan, was added to the UNESCO World Heritage List.

The castle site is about 28 kilometers southwest of Shimabarakō Station on the Shimabara Railway Line.

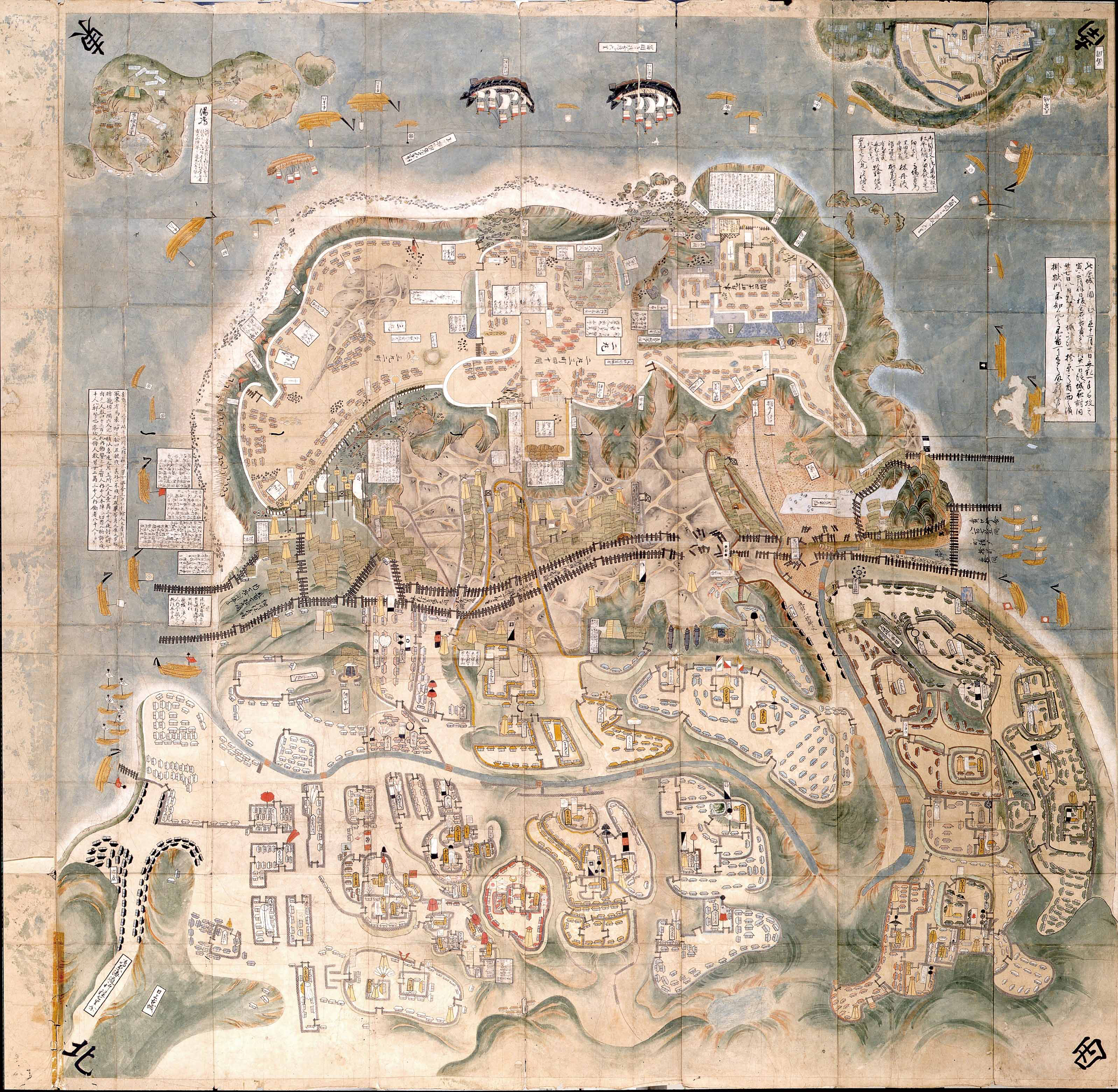
Map of the Shimabara Rebellion

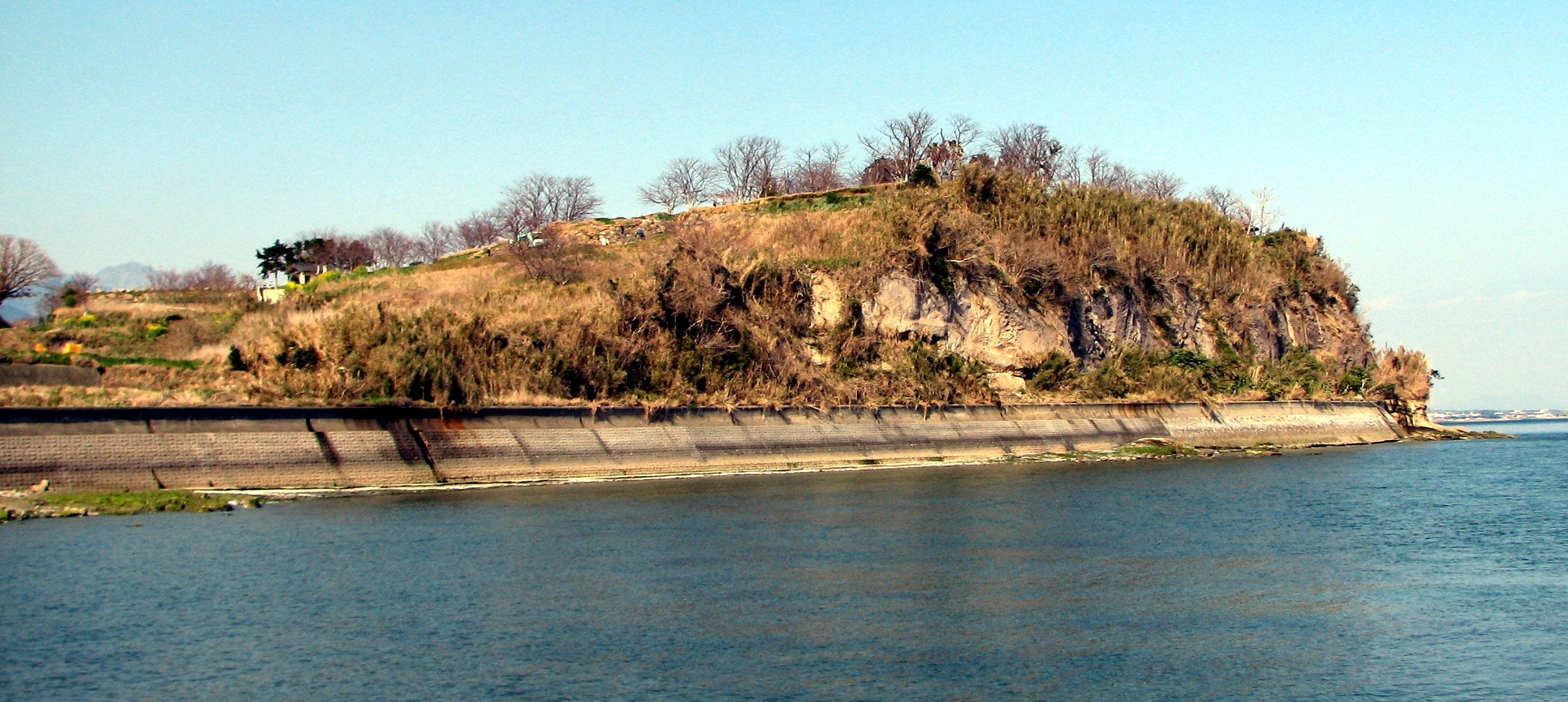
Ruins of Hara Castle from the sea

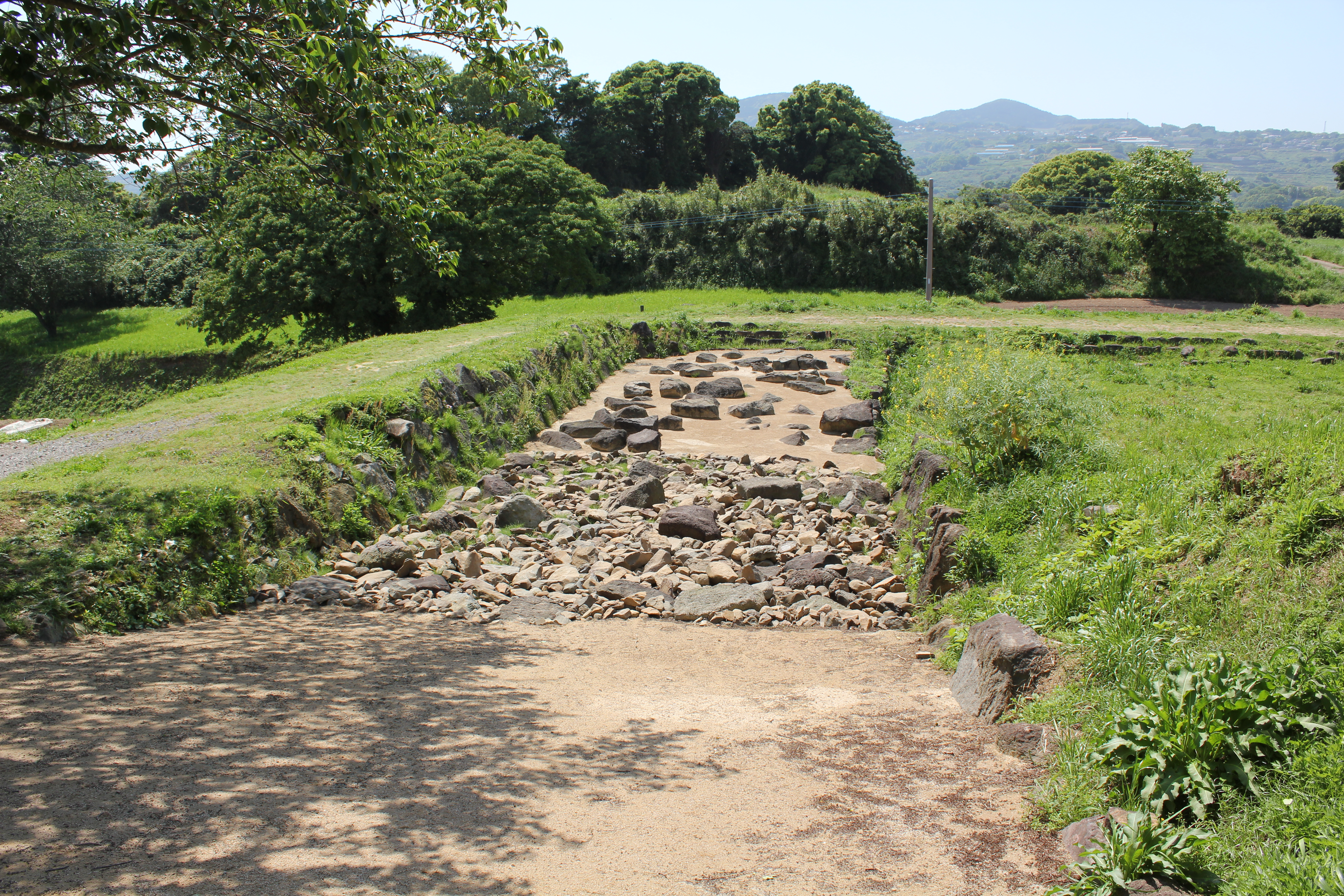
Remnants of an escape route

== See also ==
- List of Historic Sites of Japan (Nagasaki)
