= Matsukura Katsuie =

Japanese daimyō

Matsukura Katsuie (松倉 勝家; 1598 – 1638) (a.k.a. Matsukura Shigetsugu or Shigeharu) was a Japanese daimyō of the early Edo period. The son of Matsukura Shigemasa, Katsuie continued his father's policies of extraordinarily high taxation and persecution of Christians, which eventually led to the Shimabara Rebellion.

Although the rebellion was successfully put down, his status and domain were stripped away for misruling in May 1638. After a dead peasant's body was found inside his residence, Katsuie was sent to Edo for further investigation by the government. He was beheaded on August 28, 1638, having been found culpable for abusing his power and disgracing the shogunate. He was the only daimyo to be beheaded during the 300 years of Edo period (dishonored officials were usually allowed to die by seppuku).

Preceded by Matsukura Shigemasa	Daimyō of Shimabara; 1630–1638	Succeeded by Kōriki Tadafusa
