= Shimabara Rebellion =

1637–1638 rebellion in Japan

- Part of the early Edo period
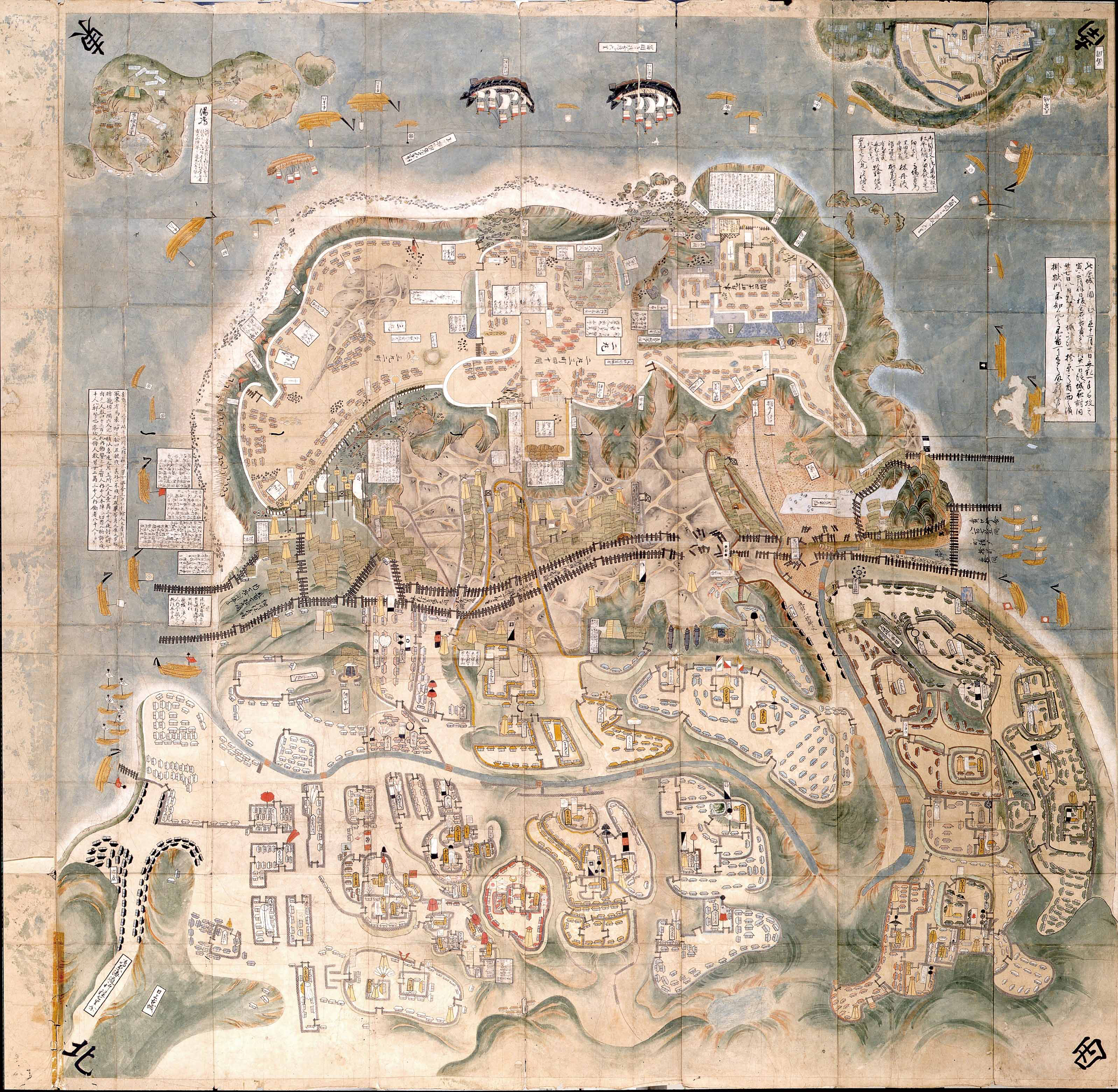
- Shimabara battle map and Hara Castle
Date	17 December 1637 – 15 April 1638
Location	Shimabara Domain, Tokugawa Shogunate (present-day Nagasaki Prefecture, Japan)
Result	Tokugawa victory

Belligerents
Tokugawa shogunate: Dutch Republic; Dutch East India Company	Japanese Catholics and rōnin peasants Portuguese traders (allegedly)

Commanders and leaders
Itakura Shigemasa †; Matsudaira Nobutsuna	Amakusa Shirō (executed); Yamada Emosaku

Strength
100,000–200,000	20,000–37,000

Casualties and losses
10,000–70,000	30,000–37,000

The Shimabara Rebellion (島原の乱, Shimabara no ran), also known as the Shimabara-Amakusa Rebellion (島原･天草の乱, Shimabara-Amakusa no ran) or Shimabara-Amakusa Ikki (島原･天草一揆), was an uprising that occurred in the Shimabara Domain of the Tokugawa shogunate in Japan from 17 December 1637 to 15 April 1638.

Matsukura Katsuie, the daimyō of the Shimabara Domain, enforced unpopular policies originally set by his father Matsukura Shigemasa that drastically raised taxes to construct the new Shimabara Castle and violently prohibited Christianity. In December 1637, an alliance of local rōnin and mostly Catholic peasants led by Amakusa Shirō rebelled against the Tokugawa shogunate due to discontent over Katsuie's policies. The Tokugawa shogunate sent a force of over 125,000 troops supported by the Dutch to suppress the rebels, which defeated the rebels after a lengthy siege of their stronghold at Hara Castle in Minamishimabara.

Following the successful suppression of the rebellion, Shirō and an estimated 37,000 rebels and sympathizers were beheaded, and the Portuguese traders suspected of helping them were expelled from Japan. Katsuie was investigated for misruling, and was eventually beheaded in Edo, the only daimyō decapitated during the Edo period. The Shimabara Domain was given to Kōriki Tadafusa. Japan's policies of national seclusion and persecution of Christianity were tightened until the Bakumatsu in the 1850s.

The rebellion is often portrayed as a Christian rebellion against violent suppression by daimyō Katsuie. However, the academic consensus holds that the rebellion was primarily motivated by peasant anger against Matsukura's misgovernance, with Christians later joining the rebellion.

The Shimabara Rebellion was the largest civil conflict in Japan during the Edo period, and was one of only a handful of instances of serious unrest during the relatively peaceful period of the Tokugawa shogunate's rule.

== Leadup and outbreak ==
In the mid-1630s, the peasants of the Shimabara Peninsula and Amakusa, dissatisfied with overtaxation and suffering from the effects of famine, revolted against their lords. This was specifically in territory ruled by two lords: Matsukura Katsuie of the Shimabara Domain, and Terasawa Katataka of the Karatsu Domain. Those affected also included fishermen, craftsmen and merchants. As the rebellion spread, it was joined by rōnin (masterless samurai) who had once served extinct local clans such as the Amakusa and Shiki, as well as former Arima clan and Konishi retainers. The image of a fully "peasant" uprising is also not entirely accurate.

Shimabara had formerly been the domain of the Arima clan, which had been Christian; as a result, many local people were also Christian. The Arima were moved out in 1614 and replaced by the anti-Christian Matsukura. The new lord, Matsukura Shigemasa, hoped to advance in the shogunate hierarchy by sponsoring expensive construction projects, including the building and expansion of Edo Castle, and contributed funding for a planned shogunate invasion of Luzon in the Spanish East Indies, today a part of the Philippines. Matsukura also built a new castle for his own clan in Shimabara. He placed a greatly disproportionate tax burden on the people of his new domain to pay for these policies, and further angered them by strictly persecuting Christianity. These policies were continued by Shigemasa's heir, Katsuie.

The inhabitants of the Amakusa Islands, which had been part of the fief of Konishi Yukinaga, suffered the same sort of persecution at the hands of the Terasawa family, which, like the Matsukura, had been granted the territory. Another growing problem was the presence of numerous unemployed samurai, including former retainers of Katō Tadahiro and Sassa Narimasa, both of whom had once ruled parts of Higo Province.

== Rebellion ==
=== Start ===
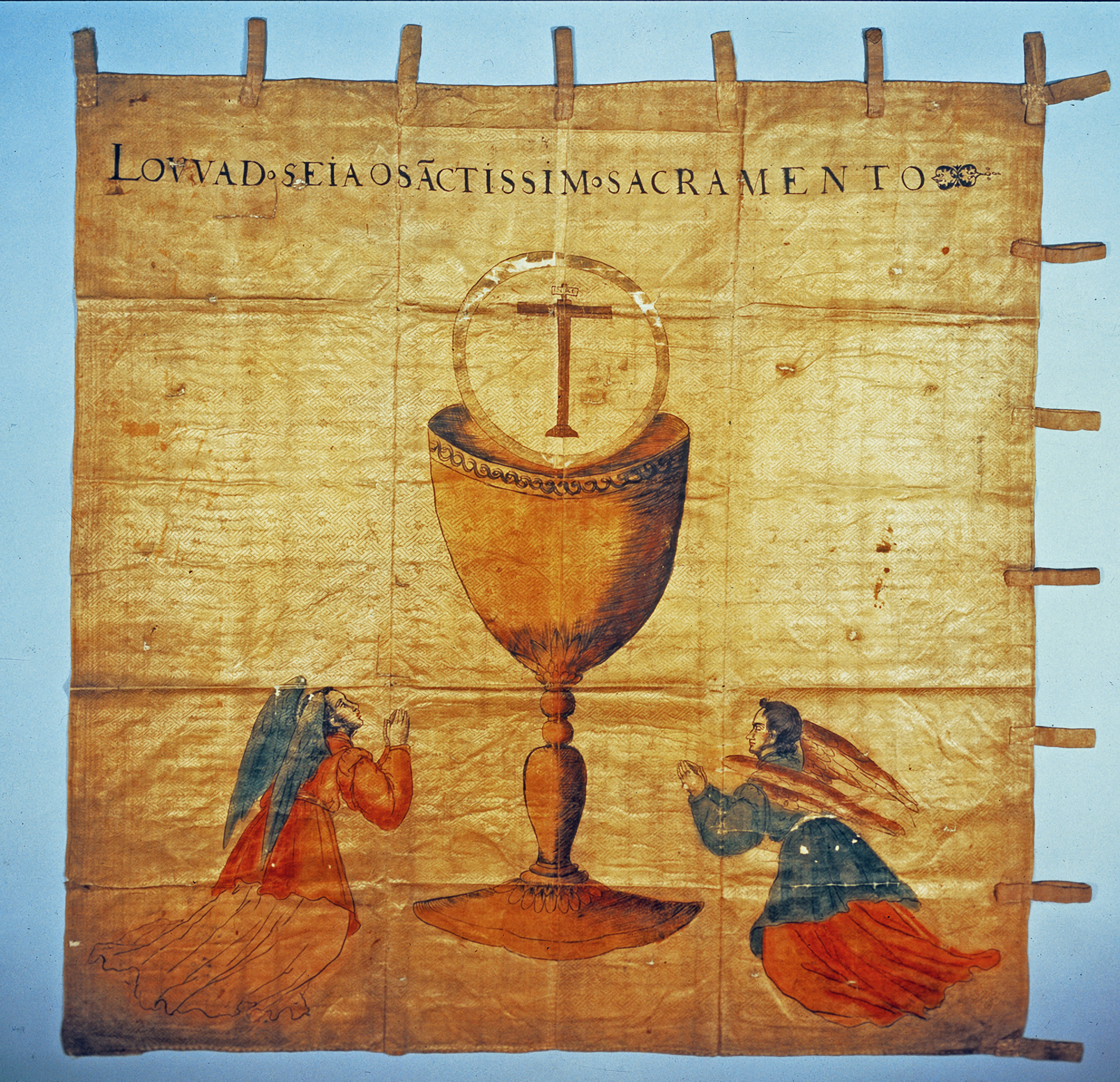
Banner of Amakusa Shirō, during the Shimabara Rebellion

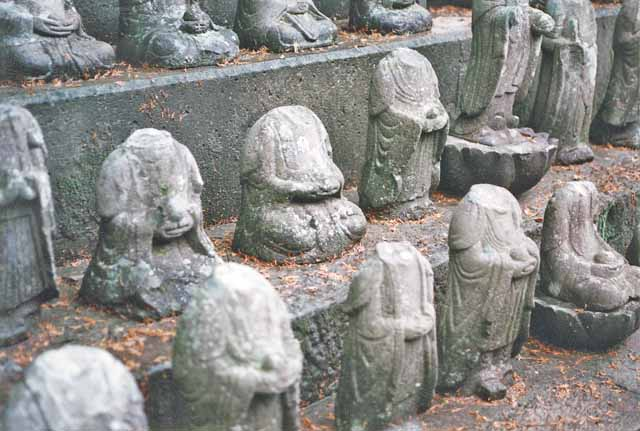
Buddhist statues of Jizō, the boddhisatva of mercy, beheaded

The discontented rōnin of the region, joined by impoverished peasants, began to meet in secret on Yushima (also called "meeting island") and plot an uprising, which broke out on 17 December 1637, when the local daikan (magistrate) Hayashi Hyōzaemon was assassinated. At the same time, others rebelled in the Amakusa Islands. The rebels quickly increased their ranks by forcing all in the areas they took to join in the uprising. A charismatic 16-year-old youth, Amakusa Shirō, soon emerged as the rebellion's leader.

The rebels laid siege to the Terasawa clan's Tomioka and Hondo castles, but just before the castles were about to fall, armies from the neighboring domains in Kyūshū arrived, forcing them to retreat. The rebels then crossed the Ariake Sea and briefly besieged Matsukura Katsuie's Shimabara Castle but were again repelled. At this point they gathered near the ruins of Hara Castle, which had been the home of the Arima clan before their move to the Nobeoka Domain and was subsequently demolished. They built up palisades using the wood from the boats they had crossed the water with, and were greatly aided in their preparations by the weapons, ammunition, and provisions they had plundered from the Matsukura clan's storehouses.

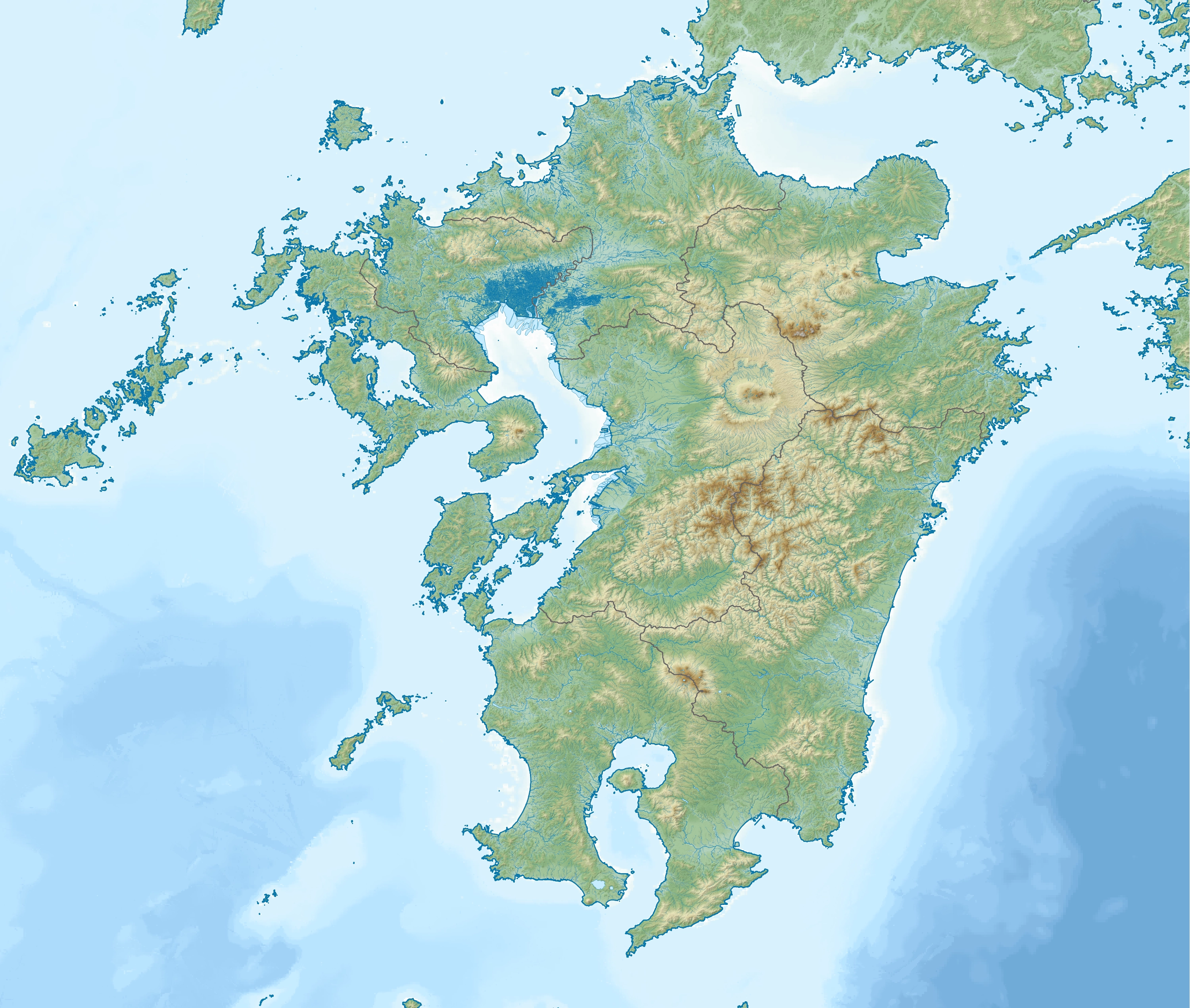
Shimabara Rebellion (1637–1638) on the map of Kyushu

=== Siege at Hara Castle ===
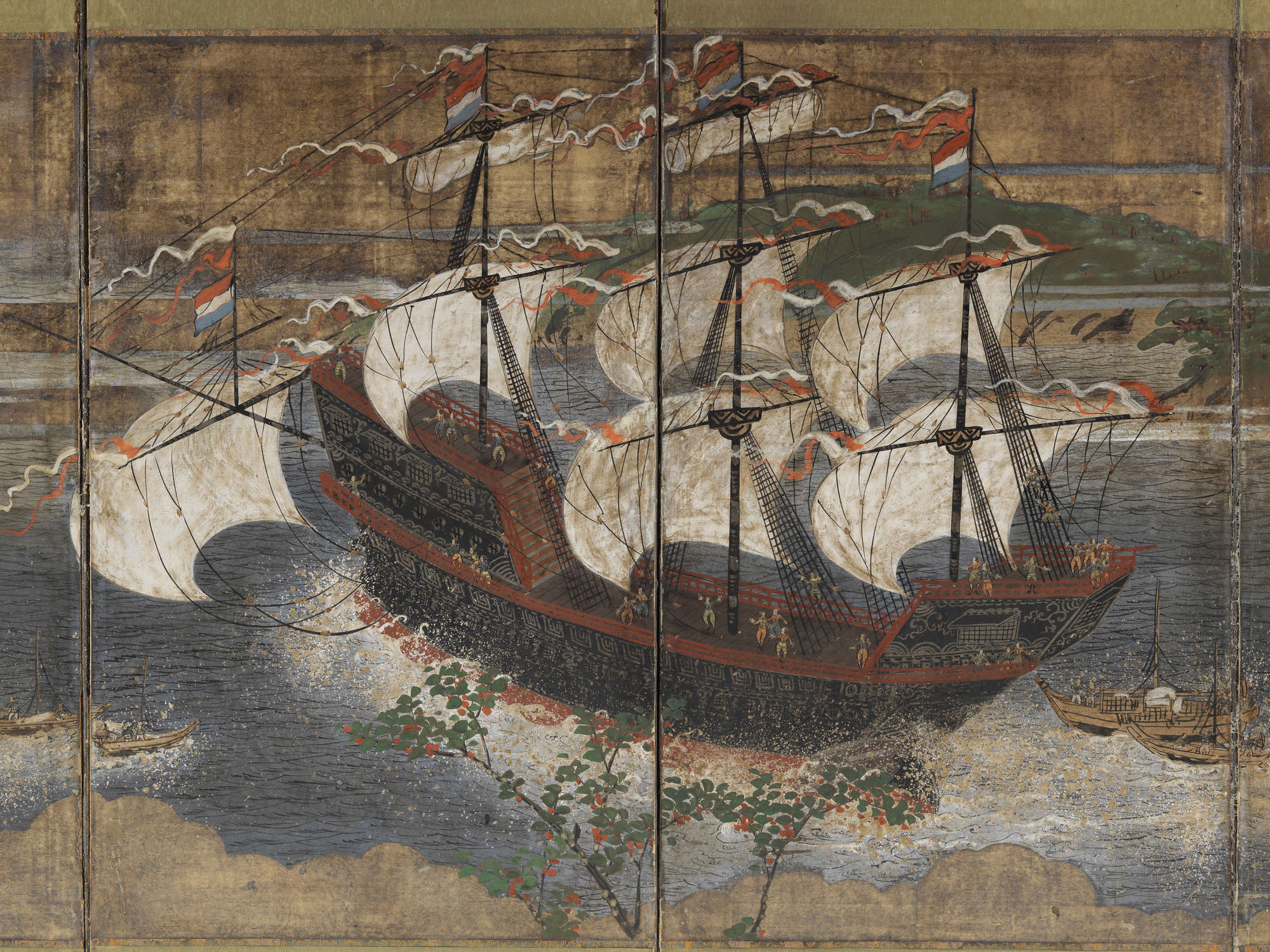
Vessel 'De Ryp' at the Shimabara rebellion

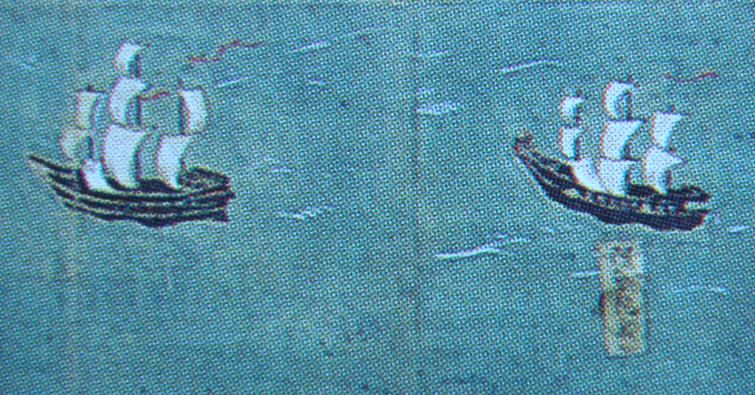
Dutch ships at the siege (detail)

The allied armies of the local domains, under the command of the Tokugawa shogunate (during shogun Tokugawa Iemitsu's reign) with Itakura Shigemasa as commander-in-chief, then began their siege of Hara Castle. The legendary swordsman Miyamoto Musashi was present during the battle; he served as a military advisor and aide to Hosokawa Tadatoshi. Musashi was knocked off his horse by a stone thrown by a peasant rebel in one of the few verifiable records of him taking part in a campaign.

The shogunate troops requested aid from the Dutch, who provided gunpowder and cannons. Nicolaes Couckebacker, Opperhoofd of the Dutch factory (trading post) on Hirado oversaw the transfer of military stores, and when the shogunate forces requested naval support, he personally accompanied the vessel de Ryp to a position offshore, near Hara Castle. The cannons sent previously were mounted in a battery, and an all-out bombardment of the fortress commenced, both from the battery and the de Ryp's cannons, but without great result. The ship withdrew at the request of the Japanese, following contemptuous messages sent by the rebels to the besieging troops:

Are there no longer courageous soldiers in the realm to do combat with us, and weren't they ashamed to have called in the assistance of foreigners against our small contingent?

Shimabara Rebellion Battle Folding Screen by Saito Shuho

=== Final push and fall ===
Itakura Shigemasa was killed in a failed advance. More shogunate troops under Matsudaira Nobutsuna, Itakura's replacement, soon arrived. However, the rebels at Hara Castle, who were led by well-trained former samurai, resisted the siege for months and caused the shogunate heavy losses. Both sides had a hard time fighting in winter conditions. On February 3, 1638, the rebels achieved a major victory when a surprise attack killed 2,000 warriors from the Hizen Domain. However, with their position surrounded and no means of establishing supply lines, their food and ammunition quickly ran out.

On 4 April 1638, over 27,000 rebels, facing about 125,000 shogunate soldiers mounted a desperate assault, but were soon forced to withdraw. From the survivors (including Yamada Emosaku, who was believed to have willingly betrayed the rebels), the shogunate forces learned of the rebels' poor condition and how they would likely be unable to withstand another direct attack.

On 12 April 1638, troops under the command of the Kuroda clan of Hizen stormed the fortress and captured the outer defenses. The remaining rebels continued to hold out and caused heavy casualties until they were routed three days later, on 15 April 1638.

=== Forces present at Shimabara ===
The Shimabara rebellion was the first massive military effort since the Siege of Osaka where the shogunate had to supervise an allied army made up of troops from various domains. The first overall commander, Itakura Shigemasa, had 800 men under his direct command; his replacement, Matsudaira Nobutsuna, had 1,500. Vice-commander Toda Ujikane had 2,500 of his own troops and 2,500 samurai of the Shimabara Domain were also present. The bulk of the shogunate's army was drawn from Shimabara's neighboring domains. The largest component, numbering over 35,000 men, came from the Saga Domain, and was under the command of Nabeshima Katsushige. Second in numbers were the forces of the Kumamoto and Fukuoka domains; 23,500 men under Hosokawa Tadatoshi and 18,000 men under Kuroda Tadayuki, respectively. From the Kurume Domain came 8,300 men under Arima Toyouji; from the Yanagawa Domain 5,500 men under Tachibana Muneshige; from the Karatsu Domain, 7,570 under Terasawa Katataka; from Nobeoka, 3,300 under Arima Naozumi; from Kokura, 6,000 under Ogasawara Tadazane and his senior retainer Takada Matabei; from Nakatsu, 2,500 under Ogasawara Nagatsugu; from Bungo-Takada, 1,500 under Matsudaira Shigenao, and from Kagoshima, 1,000 under Yamada Arinaga, a senior retainer of the Shimazu clan. The only non-Kyushu forces, apart from the commanders' personal troops, were 5,600 men from the Fukuyama Domain, under the command of Mizuno Katsunari, Katsutoshi, and Katsusada. A small number of troops from various other locations amounted to 800 additional men. In total, the shogunate's army is known to have comprised over 125,800 men. The strength of the rebel forces is not precisely known, but combatants are estimated to have numbered over 14,000, while noncombatants who sheltered in the castle during the siege were over 13,000. One source estimates the total size of the rebel force as somewhere between 27,000 and 37,000, at best a quarter of the size of the force sent by the shogunate.

== Aftermath ==
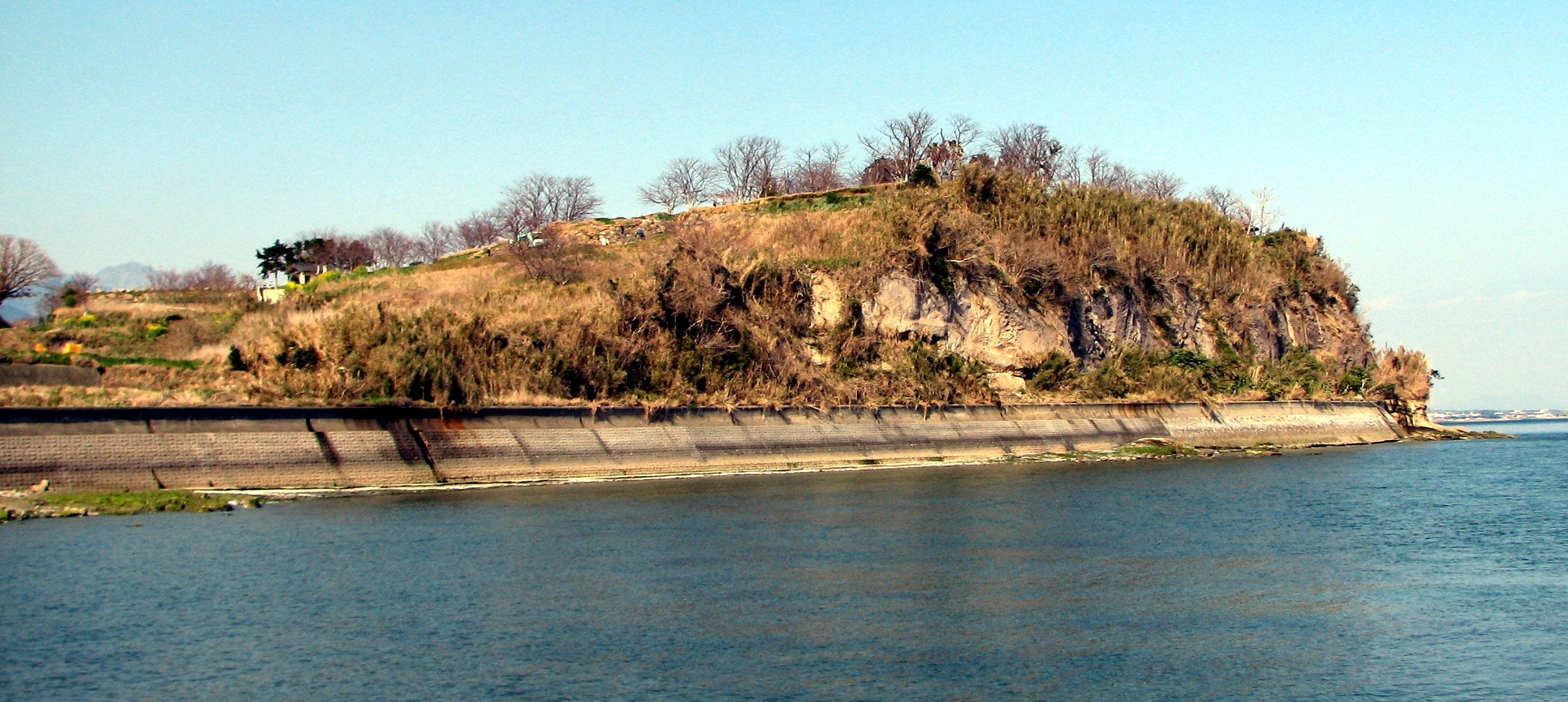
The ruins of Hara Castle on the Shimabara Peninsula

After the castle fell, the shogunate forces executed an estimated 37,000 rebels and sympathizers as punishment. Amakusa Shirō's severed head was taken to Nagasaki for public display, and the entire complex at Hara Castle was burned to the ground and buried, together with the bodies of all the dead.

Because the shogunate suspected that European Catholics had been involved in spreading the rebellion, Portuguese traders were driven out of the country. The policy of national seclusion was made stricter by 1639. An existing ban on the Christian religion was then enforced stringently, and Christianity in Japan survived only by going underground.

The rebellion also had an effect on the shogunate's international policy. In early 1637, the bakufu and the Dutch Republic had projected a joint invasion of the Spanish Philippines, which the Japanese had calculated would take no more than 10,000 samurai to submit. After the experience of fighting Christian militiamen in Shimabara, the bakufu now decided it would take 100,000 men to conquer Manila, a much better fortified city guarded by veteran troops. The Nagasaki bugyō was sent to inform the Dutch the invasion was cancelled.

Another part of the shogunate's actions after the rebellion was to excuse the clans which had aided its efforts militarily from the building contributions which the shogunate routinely required from various domains. However, Matsukura Katsuie's domain was given to another lord, Kōriki Tadafusa, and Matsukura began to be pressured by the shogunate to commit honourable ritual suicide (seppuku). However, after the body of a peasant was found in his residence, proving his misrule and brutality, Matsukura was beheaded in Edo. Terasawa Katataka's lands were also confiscated, and he committed seppuku, ending his family line.

On the Shimabara peninsula, most towns experienced a severe to total loss of men as a result of the rebellion. In order to maintain the rice fields and other crops, migrants were brought from other areas across Japan to resettle the land. All inhabitants were registered with local temples, whose priests were required to vouch for their members' religious affiliation. Following the rebellion, Buddhism was strongly promoted in the area. Certain customs were introduced which remain unique to the area today. Towns on the Shimabara peninsula also continue to have a varied mix of dialects due to large-scale migration from other parts of Japan.

With the exception of periodic, localized peasant uprisings, the Shimabara Rebellion was the last large-scale armed clash in Japan until the Boshin War.

== Memorials ==
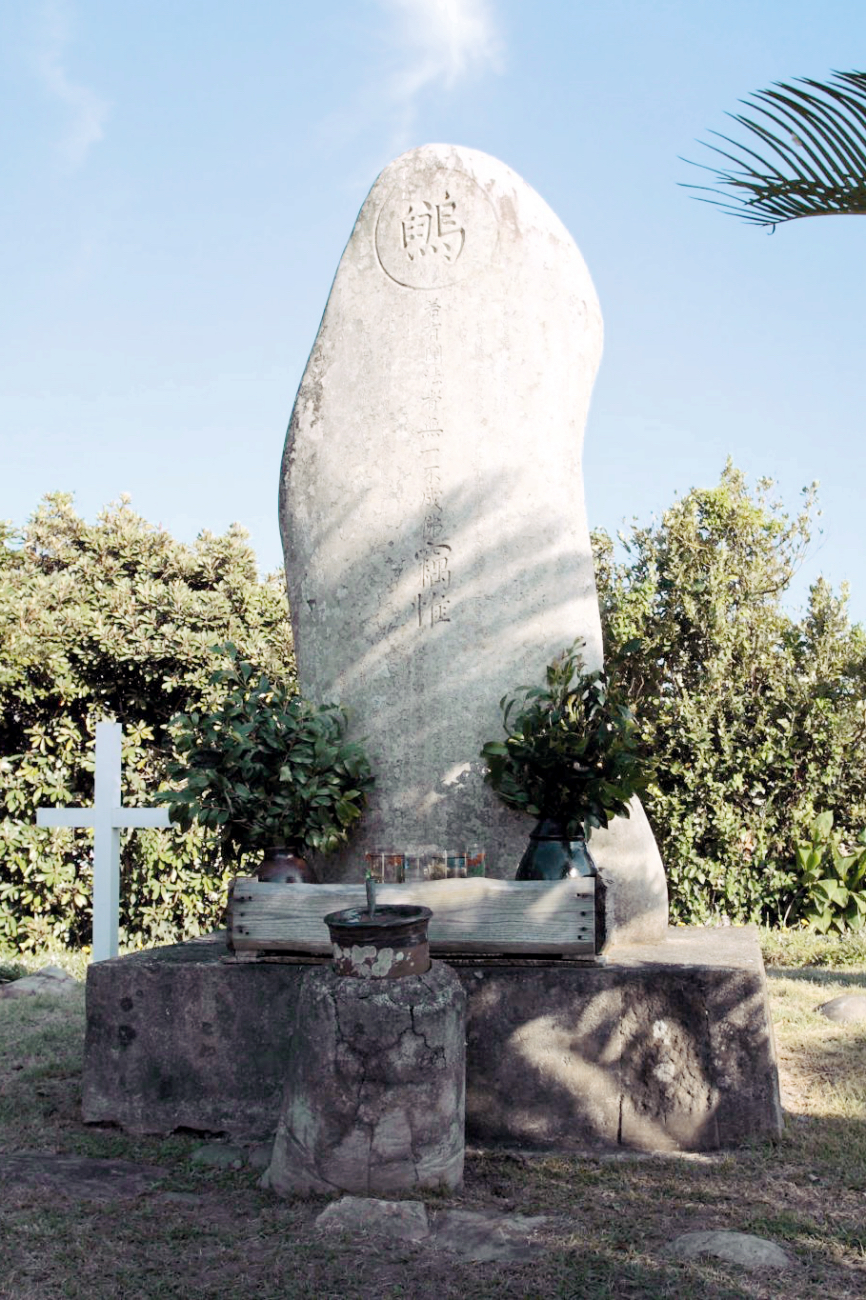
Tomioka Kirishitan Memorial

The Tomioka Christian Memorial (富岡吉利支丹供養碑, Tomioka Kirishitan kuyōhi), also known as the Senninzuka (千人塚) in the town of Reihoku, Kumamoto was erected in 1647 by Suzuki Shigenari, the first magistrate of the Amakusa islands following the rebellion. Located on a slight elevation at the sea edge, at the northwestern tip of Shimoshima Island, it is a natural andesite monolith 1.92 meters high by 82 centimeters wide and 41 centimeters thick. A kuyōtō with a Buddhist inscription, it is a form of stupa built for the purpose of memorial service so that the deceased can rest in peace. The site marks the spot where rebels assembled prior to marching on nearby Tomioka Castle, and is claimed to be the mass grave of the surviving rebels who were executed by the Tokugawa Shogunate following the end of the rebellion. It was designated a National Historic Site in 1937.

== See also ==
- Dejima
- Haibutsu kishaku
- Kakure Kirishitan
- History of the Catholic Church in Japan
