= Amakusa Shirō =

Japanese rebel and martyr (1621?–1638)

- 天草 四郎
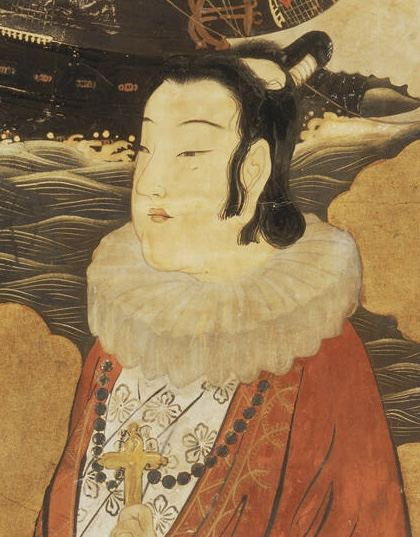
- Born: Masuda Shirō Tokisada c. 1621
- Died: 28 February 1638 (aged 17); Hara Castle; Hizen Province, Japan
- Cause of death: Beheading
- Other names: Geronimo; Francisco
- Military career
- Rank: Leader
- Nickname: "Heaven's messenger"
- Conflicts: Shimabara Rebellion

Masuda Shirō Tokisada (益田 四郎 時貞; c. 1621 – 28 February 1638), also known as Amakusa Shirō (天草 四郎), was a Japanese Christian of the Edo period and leader of the Shimabara Rebellion, an uprising of Japanese Roman Catholics against the Shogunate. His Christian name was Geronimo and he was later known as Francisco.

The uprising led by Shirō was defeated, and he was executed at the age of 17. His head was displayed on a pike near Nagasaki as a warning to Christians. His efforts as the spiritual leader of the uprising, and the inevitable defeat of the Christian rebels at Hara Castle, were reflected in the 1962 movie Amakusa Shirō Tokisada (shown in English-speaking countries as The Christian Revolt or The Revolutionary), by the Japanese movie director Nagisa Oshima.

== Early life ==
Shirō was born in 1621 as the son of Catholic parents, Masuda Jinbei (益田 甚兵衛), a former Konishi clan retainer, and his wife. Legend speculates that Shirō could have been the illegitimate son of Toyotomi Hideyori, but these claims have little credibility.

Portuguese Jesuit missionaries had been active in Japan since the late 16th century. By the age of 15, the charismatic youth was known to his Japanese Catholic followers as "Heaven's messenger". Miraculous powers were attributed to him.

== Rebellion ==
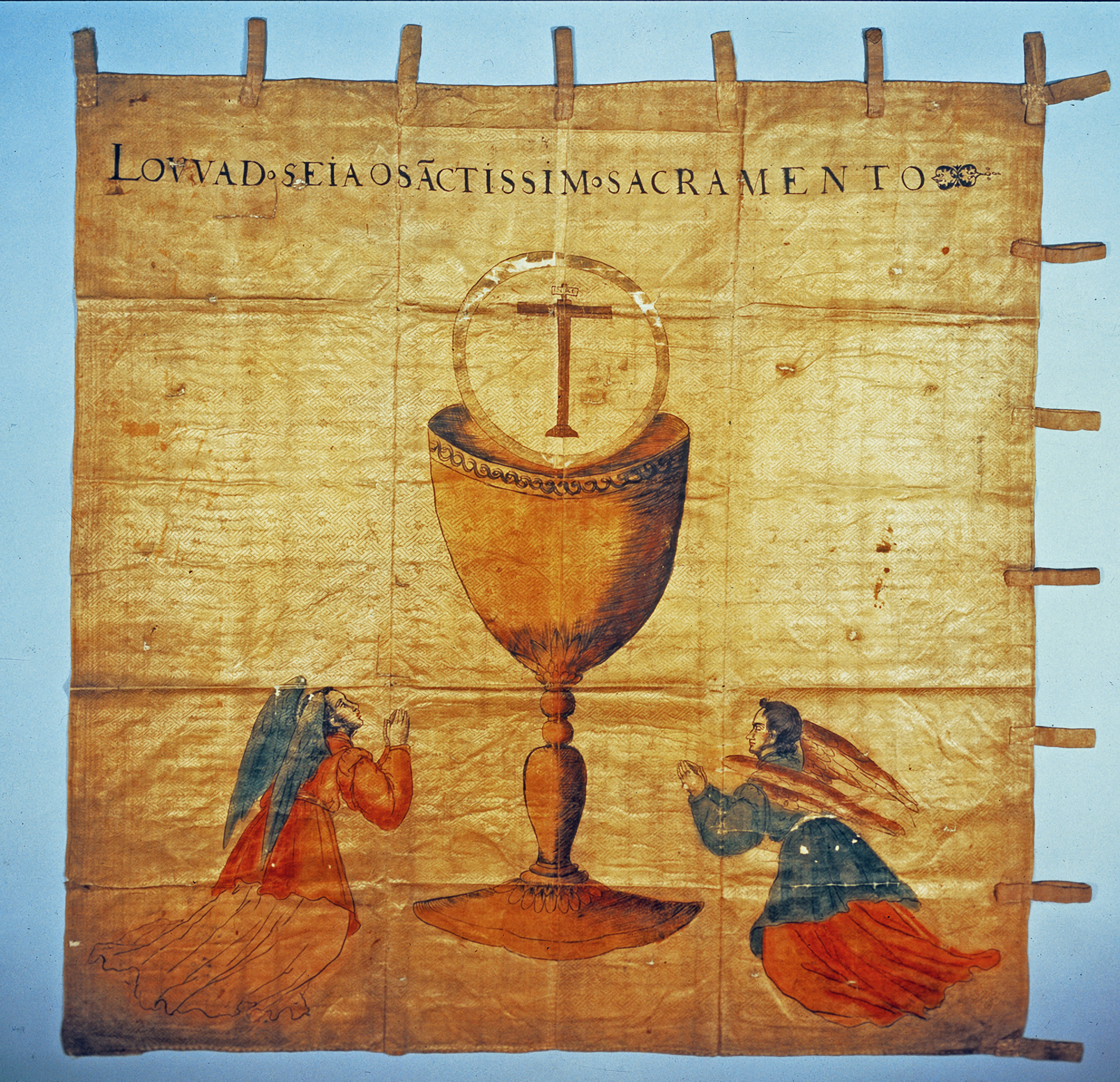
Banner of Amakusa Shirō, during the Shimabara Rebellion. Text on the banner is medieval Portuguese reading "LOVVADo SEIA O SÃCTISSIMo SACRAMENTO". English meaning "Praised be the Most Holy Sacrament".

Shirō was among Japanese Catholics who took over Hara Castle in a rebellion against the Shogunate. They mounted a coordinated defense that held off attackers, but the rebel force had no logistical support, and their resolve was weakened. Shirō was said to display posters in the castle to raise morale and said:

Now, those who accompany me in being besieged in this castle, will be my friends unto the next world.

One of the rebel soldiers, Yamada Emosaku, betrayed Shirō. He got a message to the Shogunate that rebel food supplies were running low. The Shogunate forces made a final assault, taking Hara Castle in the process. The Shogunate forces massacred almost 40,000 rebels. Yamada was the only recorded survivor.

== Death ==
Shirō was taken captive and executed after the castle was captured. His head was displayed on a pike in Nagasaki for an extended period of time as a warning to potential Christian rebels.

== Bibliography ==
- Clements, Jonathan (2016). Christ's Samurai: The True Story of the Shimabara Rebellion. London: Robinson.
- Morris, Ivan (1975). The Nobility of Failure: Tragic Heroes in the History of Japan. London: Secker and Warburg.
