= Battle of Noryang =

1598 Japan–Korea battle

- Part of the Japanese invasions of Korea (1592–1598)
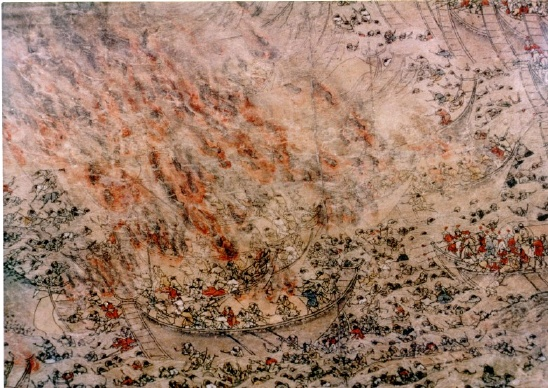
- The Battle of Noryang as depicted in the scroll Jeongwae Gigong Dogwon (征倭紀功圖卷).
| Date | 16 December 1598 (Gregorian Calendar); Keichō 3, 19th day of 11 month (Lunar calendar) |
| Location | Noryang Strait, off the coast of Namhae Island 34°56′43″N 127°52′35″E |
| Result | Joseon and Ming victory: End of the Imjin War |

Belligerents
| Japan | Joseon; Ming dynasty |

Commanders and leaders
| Main: Konishi Yukinaga; Reinforcement: Shimazu Yoshihiro; Tachibana Muneshige; Wakizaka Yasuharu; So Yoshitoshi; Takahashi Naotugu; Kobayakawa Hidekane; Tsukushi Hirokado; Terazawa Hirotaka | Yi Sun-sin †; Yi Yeong-nam †; Chen Lin; Chen Kan; Deng Zilong † |

Strength
| 300 ships 500 ships (Korean sources) | 148 ships: Joseon: 85 warships; Ming: 65 warships; 2 Panokseons; 6 large junks; 57 small junks |

Casualties and losses
| 200 ships sunk 100 ships captured 500 soldiers beheaded 100+ soldiers captured 13,000 soldiers killed 200 ships | 500 soldiers and sailors 1 Panokseon crippled |
- Location within South Korea

Battle of Noryang

Chinese name
- Chinese: 露梁海战
Transcriptions
Standard Mandarin
- Hanyu Pinyin: Lu liang hai zhan

Korean name
- Hangul: 노량해전
- Hanja: 露梁海戰
Transcriptions
- Revised Romanization: Noryang Haejeon
- McCune–Reischauer: Noryang Haejŏn

Japanese name
- Kanji: 露梁海戦
Transcriptions
- Romanization: Roryō kaisen

The Battle of Noryang, the last major battle of the Japanese invasions of Korea (1592–1598), was fought between the Japanese navy and the combined fleets of the Joseon Kingdom and the Ming dynasty. It took place in the early morning of 16 December (19 November in the Lunar calendar) 1598 and ended past dawn.

The allied force of about 150 Joseon and Ming Chinese ships, led by admirals Yi Sun-sin and Chen Lin, attacked and either destroyed or captured more than half of the 500 Japanese ships commanded by Shimazu Yoshihiro, who was attempting to link-up with Konishi Yukinaga. The battered survivors of Shimazu's fleet limped back to Busan and a few days later left for Japan. At the height of the battle, Yi was hit by a bullet from an arquebus and died shortly thereafter. Chen Lin reported the news back to the Wanli Emperor, and Chen and Yi were celebrated as national heroes thereafter.

== Prelude ==
Due to setbacks in land and sea battles, the Japanese armies had been driven back to their network of fortresses, or wajō (和城), on the southeastern Korean coast. However, the wajō could not hold the entire Japanese army, so, in June 1598, Toyotomi Hideyoshi, the Taikō who instigated the Japanese invasions of Korea (1592–1598), and also the acting Japanese Lord of War, ordered 70,000 troops mostly from the Japanese Army of the Right to withdraw to the archipelago. On 18 September 1598, Hideyoshi unexpectedly died at Fushimi castle. The Japanese forces in Korea were ordered to withdraw back to Japan by the new governing Council of Five Elders.

The Sunch'on wajō was the westernmost Japanese fortress and contained 14,000 troops commanded by Konishi Yukinaga, who was the leader of Japan's vanguard contingent during the first invasion, in 1592. Yi Sun-sin and Chen Lin blocked Konishi from retreat, but Konishi sent many gifts to Chen in an attempt to bribe the Ming commander into lifting the blockade. At first, Chen agreed to withdraw the allied fleet, but Yi steadfastly refused to comply. Then Chen suggested that the allied fleet attack smaller, more vulnerable wajō, such as the fort at Namhae. Yi rejected that strategy as well. Yi argued that Konishi, who commanded one of the largest wajō, would be allowed to escape if the allies were to leave and fight elsewhere.

On 15 December, about 20,000 Japanese troops from the wajō of Sach'on, Goseong, and Namhae boarded 500 ships and began to mass east of the Noryang Strait in an attempt to break the allied blockade of Sunch'on. The overall commander of this relief force was Shimazu Yoshihiro, the leader of the Sach'on wajō.

The objective of the allied fleet was to prevent the link-up of Shimazu's fleet with the fleet of Konishi, then attack and defeat Shimazu's fleet. The objective of Shimazu's fleet was to cross Noryang Strait, link up with Konishi and retreat to Busan. Shimazu knew that Konishi was trying to cause disunity within the Joseon-Ming alliance and hoped that they would be busy elsewhere or still blockading the Sunch'on wajō and thus vulnerable to an attack from their rear.

== Battle ==
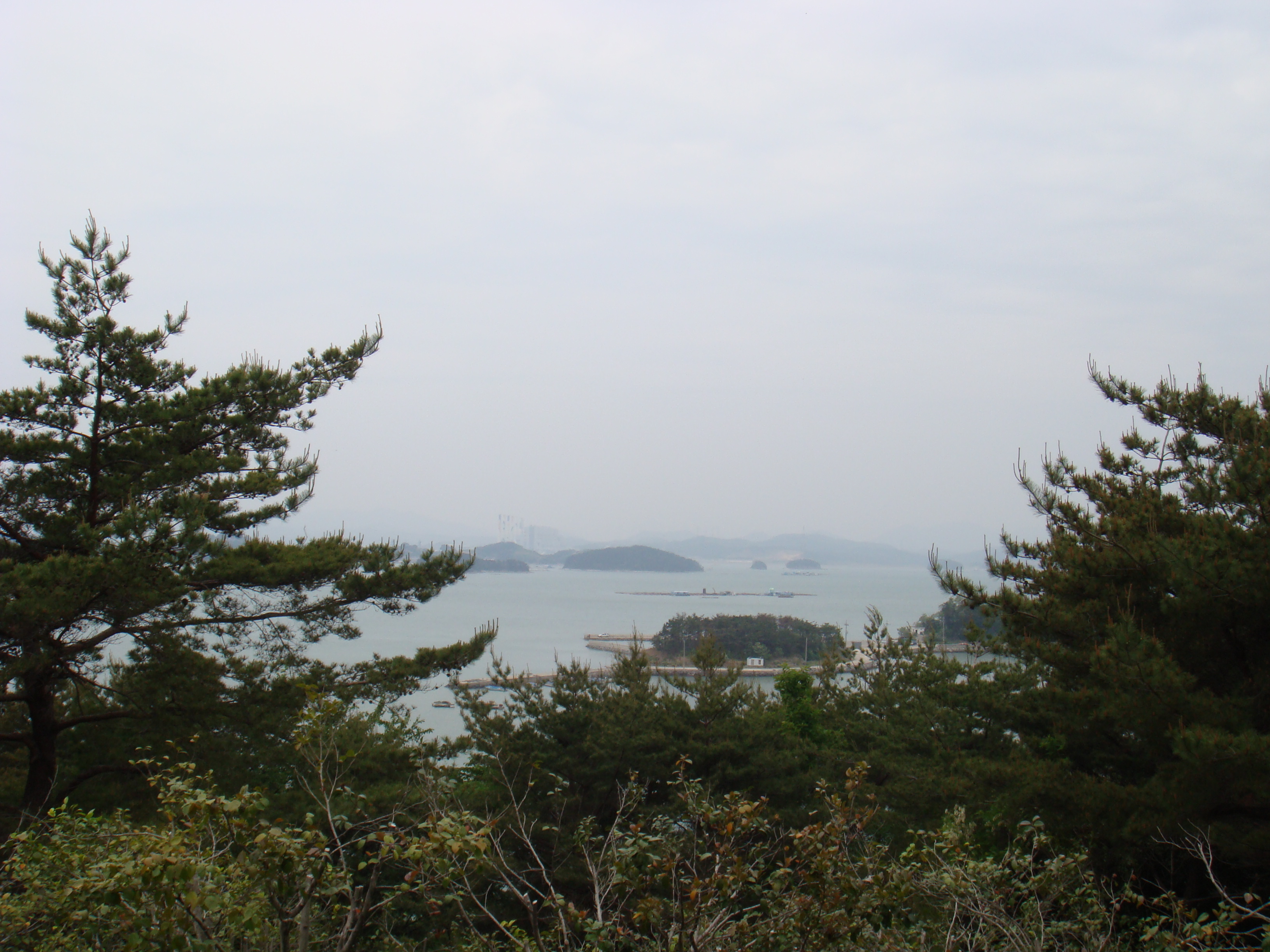
Looking north, sea off Gwaneumpo

On 15 December, a huge Japanese fleet was amassed in Sach'on Bay, on the east end of the Noryang Strait. Shimazu was not sure whether the allied fleet was continuing the blockade of Konishi's wajō, on its way to attack an abandoned wajō further east, or blocking their way on the western end of Noryang Strait. Yi, meanwhile, knew exactly where Shimazu was after receiving reports from scouts and local fishermen.

The Joseon fleet consisted of 82 panokseon multi-decked oared ships. The Ming fleet consisted of six large war junks (true battle vessels most likely used as flagships) that were driven by both oars and sails, 57 lighter war ships driven by oars alone (most likely transports converted for battle use), and two panokseon provided by Yi. In terms of manpower, the allied fleet had 8,000 sailors and marines under Yi, 5,000 Ming men of the Guangdong Squadron, and 2,600 Ming marines who fought aboard Korean ships, a total of almost 16,000 sailors and fighting men. The Ming fleet was divided into two squadrons, the larger of which was commanded by Chen and the smaller by Deng Zilong. The allied fleet was well-equipped with cannons, mortars, archers, and arquebusiers. The Japanese had 500 ships, but a significant part of their fleet consisted of light transports. The Japanese ships were well-armed with arquebuses and also had some captured Joseon cannon. The allied fleet was outnumbered, but made up for it with ships which, on average, had superior firepower and heavier, more sturdy construction.

The allied fleet waited for Shimazu on the west end of Noryang Strait. The battle began around 2:00 am on 16 December. It was, from the very beginning, a desperate affair with the Japanese determined to fight through the allied fleet and the allies equally determined to keep them from breaking through and advancing.

As in Yi's previous battles, the Japanese were unable to respond effectively to the Korean and Chinese cannon fire. When the Japanese fleet was significantly damaged, Chen ordered his fleet to engage in melee combat. This allowed the Japanese to use their arquebuses and fight using their traditional fighting style of boarding enemy ships. When Chen's flagship was attacked, Yi had to order his fleet to engage in hand-to-hand combat as well.

Song Hui-rip, the captain of Yi's flagship, was struck in the helmet by an arquebus ball and fell unconscious for a time. The vessels got so close that Joseon ships were able to throw burning wood onto the decks of Japanese ships.

Heavy Japanese arquebus fire forced the Chinese sailors to keep their heads low, while the Japanese closed in. Several parties boarded Chen's flagship and, in the hand-to-hand fighting that ensued, Chen's son was injured parrying a sword thrust directed at his father. Seeing Chen's ship in trouble, the Ming left wing commander Deng Zilong and two hundred of his personal guard transferred to a Joseon panokseon (one of two given to the Ming fleet by Yi) and rowed to his aid. Several Ming ships, mistaking the panokseon for a Japanese ship, opened fire and disabled it. The stricken panokseon drifted towards the Japanese, who boarded and killed everyone on board, including Deng.

By the middle of the battle, as dawn was about to break, the allied fleet had the upper hand and half of Shimazu's fleet was either sunk or captured. It was said that Yoshihiro's flagship was sunk and that he was clinging to a piece of wood in the icy water. Japanese ships came to his rescue, pulling him to safety. During the course of the battle, the ships fought from the west end of the strait all the way across to the east end, almost to the open water. The Japanese sustained heavy damage and began to retreat along the south coast of Namhae Island, towards Pusan.

=== Yi's death ===
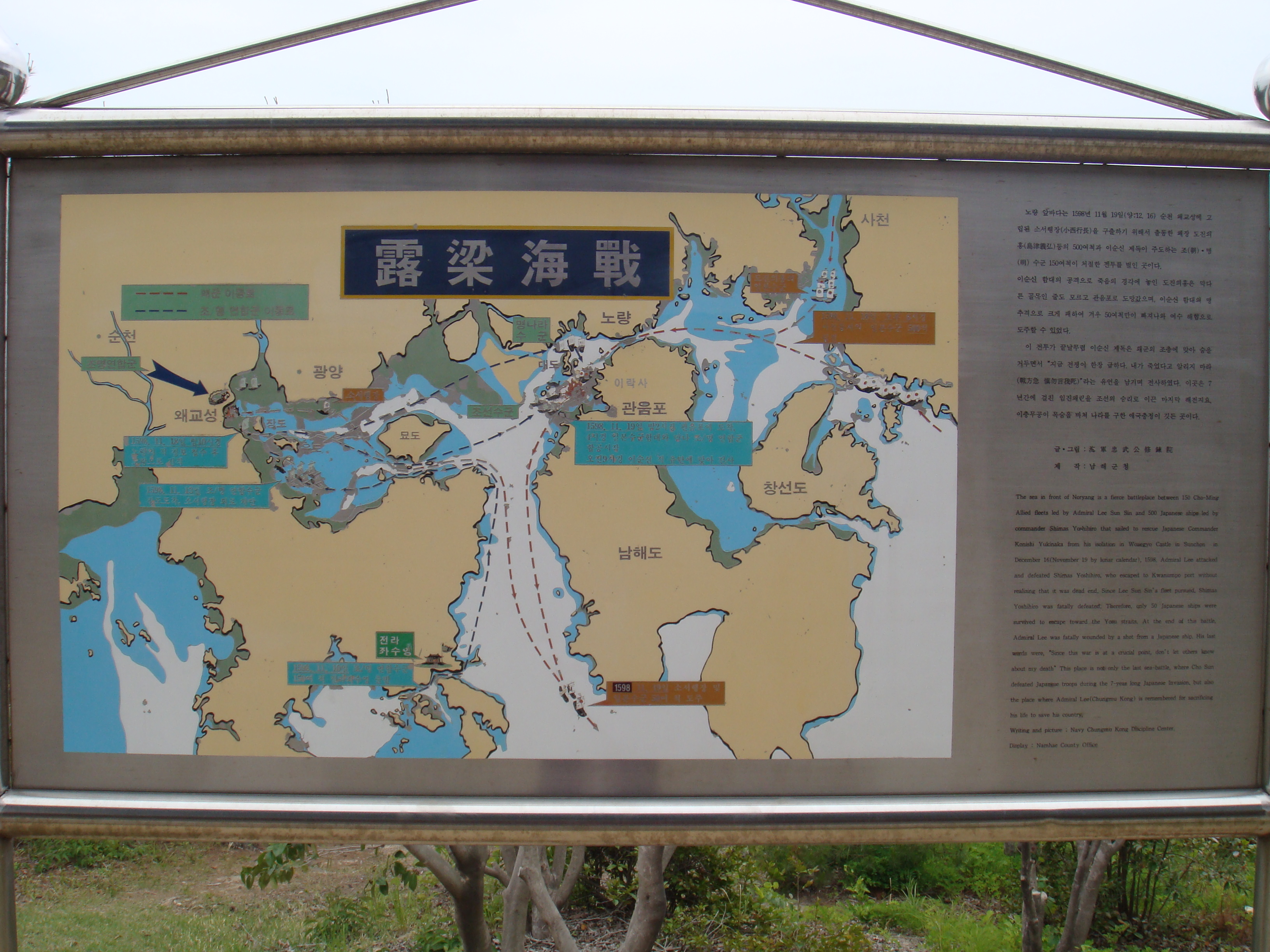
A map showing the movements of the navies in the battle

As the Japanese retreated, Yi ordered a vigorous pursuit. During this time a stray arquebus bullet from an enemy ship struck him near the armpit, on his left side. Sensing that the wound was fatal, the admiral uttered, "We are about to win the war – keep beating the war drums. Do not announce my death."

Only three people witnessed Yi Sun-sin's death including Yi Hoe (his eldest son), his adjutant Song Hui-rip, and Yi Wan, his nephew. They struggled to regain their composure and carried Sun-sin's body into his cabin before others could notice. For the remainder of the battle, Wan wore his uncle's armor and continued to beat the war drum to let the rest of the fleet know that the Admiral's flagship was still in the fight.

Chen's ship was again in trouble, and Yi's flagship rowed to his rescue. Yi's flagship fought off and sank several Japanese ships, and Chen called for Yi to thank him for coming to his aid. However, Chen was met by Wan who announced that his uncle was dead. It is said that Chen himself was so shocked that he fell to the ground three times, beating his chest and crying. News of Yi's death spread quickly throughout the allied fleet.

== Aftermath ==
Out of 500 Japanese ships under Shimazu's command, an estimated 200 were able to make it back to Busan Harbor (other Joseon archives record that Shimazu's remnants were fiercely pursued by Yi Sun-sin's fleet: only 50 ships of Shimazu's armada ever managed to escape). Konishi Yukinaga left his fortress on 16 December and his men were able to retreat by sailing through the southern end of Namhae Island, bypassing both the Noryang Strait and the battle. This led to the loss of crucial supply lines that caused the inevitable loss of all Japanese strongholds in Korea. During the withdrawal, Konishi Yukinaga took part in the rescue of approximately 500 stranded Shimazu troops, including Kabayama Hisataka, from Namhae Island. This operation was carried out in coordination with the Terazawa, Shimazu, Matsuura, and Ōmura clans, following Terazawa Masanari’s call for action. Konishi Yukinaga, Shimazu Yoshihiro, Katō Kiyomasa, and other Japanese generals of the Left Army congregated in Busan and withdrew to Japan on 21 December. The last ships sailed to Japan on 24 December.

Yi Sun-sin's body was brought back to his home town in Asan to be buried next to his father, Yi Chong (in accordance with Korean tradition). The court gave him the posthumous rank of Minister of the Right. Shrines, both official and unofficial, were constructed in his honor. In 1643, Yi was given the title of chungmugong, "duke/lord of loyal valor".

Chen gave a eulogy while attending Yi's funeral. He then withdrew his forces to Ming China and received high military honors. Joseon officials feared another Japanese invasion and requested the Ming army to remain. The Ming agreed and left behind a force of 3–4,000, which aided Joseon efforts in rebuilding and training forces until 1601.

== See also ==
- Naval history of Korea

== Bibliography ==
- Alagappa, Muthiah (2003), Asian Security Order: Instrumental and Normative Features, Stanford University Press, ISBN 0-8047-4629-X
- Arano, Yasunori (2005), The Formation of a Japanocentric World Order, International Journal of Asian Studies
- Brown, Delmer M. (May 1948), "The Impact of Firearms on Japanese Warfare, 1543–1598", The Far Eastern Quarterly, 7 (3), Association for Asian Studies: 236–53, doi:10.2307/2048846, JSTOR 2048846, S2CID 162924328
- Choi, Byung-hyon (2002), The Book of Corrections: Reflections on the National Crisis during the Japanese Invasion of Korea, Institute of East Asian Studies: University of California, Berkeley, ISBN 978-1-55729-076-2
- Eikenberry, Karl W. (1988), "The Imjin War", Military Review, 68 (2): 74–82
- Ha, Tae-hung (1979), Imjin Changch'o: Admiral Yi Sun-Sin's Memorials to Court, Yonsei University Press
- Ha, Tae-hung; Sohn, Pow-key (1977), 'Nanjung Ilgi: War Diary of Admiral Yi Sun-sin, Yonsei University Press, ISBN 89-7141-018-3
- Haboush, JaHyun Kim (2016), The Great East Asian War and the Birth of the Korean Nation
- Hawley, Samuel (2005), The Imjin War, The Royal Asiatic Society, Korea Branch/UC Berkeley Press, ISBN 89-954424-2-5
- Hawley, Samuel (2014), The Imjin War: Japan's Sixteenth-Century Invasion of Korea and Attempt to Conquer China, Conquistador Press, ISBN 978-0-9920786-2-1
- Jang, Pyun-soon (1998), Noon-eu-ro Bo-nen Han-gook-yauk-sa 5: Gor-yeo Si-dae (눈으로 보는 한국역사 5: 고려시대), Park Doo-ui, Bae Keum-ram, Yi Sang-mi, Kim Ho-hyun, Kim Pyung-sook, et al., Joog-ang Gyo-yook-yaun-goo-won. 1998-10-30. Seoul, Korea.
- Kagoshima Prefectural Office for the Compilation of Meiji Restoration Historical Materials (鹿児島県維新史料編さん所) (1982), 鹿児島県史料 旧記雑録 後編三 [Historical Records of Kagoshima Prefecture: Kyūki Zatsuroku, Later Supplement Volume 3] (PDF) (in Japanese), Kagoshima, Japan: Kagoshima Prefecture, pp. 294–295
- Kim, Ki-chung (Fall 1999), "Resistance, Abduction, and Survival: The Documentary Literature of the Imjin War (1592–8)", Korean Culture, 20 (3): 20–29
- Kim, Yung-sik (1998), "Problems and Possibilities in the Study of the History of Korean Science", Osiris, 2nd Series, 13: 48–79, doi:10.1086/649280, JSTOR 301878, S2CID 143724260
- 桑田忠親 [Kuwata, Tadachika], ed., 舊參謀本部編纂, [Kyu Sanbo Honbu], 朝鮮の役 [Chousen no Eki] (日本の戰史 [Nihon no Senshi] Vol. 5), 1965.
- Man'gap, Na (2021), The Diary of 1636: The Second Manchu Invasion of Korea
- Neves, Jaime Ramalhete (1994), "The Portuguese in the Im-Jim War?", Review of Culture, 18: 20–24
- Niderost, Eric (June 2001), "Turtleboat Destiny: The Imjin War and Yi Sun Shin", Military Heritage, 2 (6): 50–59, 89
- Niderost, Eric (January 2002), "The Miracle at Myongnyang, 1597", Osprey Military Journal, 4 (1): 44–50
- Park, Yune-hee (1973), Admiral Yi Sun-shin and His Turtleboat Armada: A Comprehensive Account of the Resistance of Korea to the 16th Century Japanese Invasion, Shinsaeng Press
- Rockstein, Edward D. (1993), Strategic And Operational Aspects of Japan's Invasions of Korea 1592–1598 1993-6-18, Naval War College
- Sadler, A. L. (June 1937), "The Naval Campaign in the Korean War of Hideyoshi (1592–1598)", Transactions of the Asiatic Society of Japan, Second Series, 14: 179–208
- Sansom, George (1961), A History of Japan 1334–1615, Stanford University Press, ISBN 0-8047-0525-9
- Sohn, Pow-key (April–June 1959), "Early Korean Painting", Journal of the American Oriental Society, 79 (2): 96–103, doi:10.2307/595851, JSTOR 595851
- Stramigioli, Giuliana (December 1954), "Hideyoshi's Expansionist Policy on the Asiatic Mainland", Transactions of the Asiatic Society of Japan, Third Series, 3: 74–116
- Strauss, Barry (Summer 2005), "Korea's Legendary Admiral", MHQ: The Quarterly Journal of Military History, 17 (4): 52–61
- Swope, Kenneth M. (2006), "Beyond Turtleboats: Siege Accounts from Hideyoshi's Second Invasion of Korea, 1597–1598", Sungkyun Journal of East Asian Studies, 6 (2), Academy of East Asian Studies: 177–206
- Swope, Kenneth M. (2005), "Crouching Tigers, Secret Weapons: Military Technology Employed During the Sino-Japanese-Korean War, 1592–1598", The Journal of Military History, 69: 11–42, doi:10.1353/jmh.2005.0059, S2CID 159829515
- Swope, Kenneth M. (December 2002), "Deceit, Disguise, and Dependence: China, Japan, and the Future of the Tributary System, 1592–1596", The International History Review, 24 (4): 757–782, doi:10.1080/07075332.2002.9640980, S2CID 154827808
- Swope, Kenneth M. (2009), A Dragon's Head and a Serpent's Tail: Ming China and the First Great East Asian War, 1592–1598, University of Oklahoma Press
- Turnbull, Stephen (2002), Samurai Invasion: Japan's Korean War 1592–98, Cassell & Co, ISBN 0-304-35948-3
- Turnbull, Stephen (2008), The Samurai Invasion of Korea 1592-98, Osprey Publishing Ltd
- Turnbull, Stephen (1998), The Samurai Sourcebook, Cassell & Co, ISBN 1-85409-523-4
- Villiers, John (1980), SILK and Silver: Macau, Manila and Trade in the China Seas in the Sixteenth Century (A lecture delivered to the Hong Kong Branch of the Royal Asiatic Society at the Hong Kong Club. 10 June 1980)
- Yi, Min-woong (2004), Imjin Wae-ran Haejeonsa: The Naval Battles of the Imjin War [임진왜란 해전사], Chongoram Media [청어람미디어], ISBN 89-89722-49-7
