= Siege of Uto =

- Part of Sekigahara Campaign
Date	1600
Location	Uto castle, Kyūshū 32°40′46″N 130°38′47″E
Result	Tokugawa victory

Belligerents
Eastern army; Tokugawa forces	Western army; Mōri forces

Commanders and leaders
Katō Kiyomasa; Nabeshima Naoshige	Konishi Yukikage
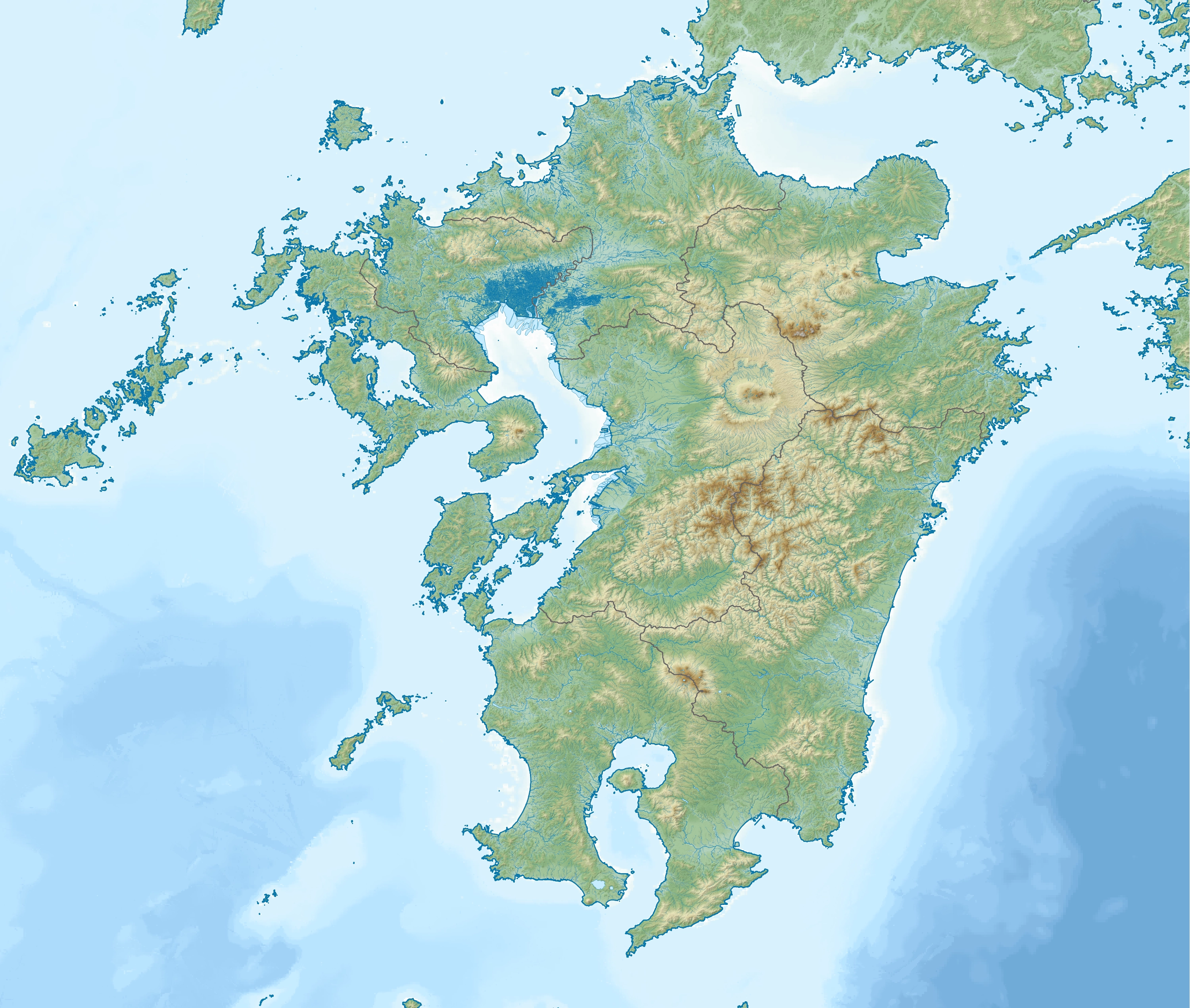
- Location within Kyushu Siege of Uto (Japan)

The siege of Uto was a battle during the final years of the Azuchi–Momoyama period (17th century) of Japan. Katō Kiyomasa besieged Uto castle. Uto castle at the time had belonged to his old rival, Konishi Yukinaga who joined western forces under Mōri Terumoto's and Ishida Mitsunari side.

== History ==
During this part of the Sekigahara campaign, Katō Kiyomasa helped the cause of the Tokugawa under Tokugawa Ieyasu in Kyūshū.

As Konishi Yukinaga was fighting with Ishida Mitsunari, he left Uto Castle to his brother, Konishi Yukikage (Hayato). Yukikage sent a messenger to ask for reinforcement from Konishi Yukishige and the Shimazu clan in Mugishima Castle. However, the messenger was captured by Kiyomasa and a fake messenger was sent. The defender in Mugishima castle believed it and sent a reinforcement, which was defeated by Kato Kiyomasa. As the result, the defenders of Uto failed to get reinforcement. However, they fought bravely and Yukikage managed to kill Kato senior vassal, Kajiwara Kagetoshi (梶原景俊).

A month had passed since the Battle of Sekigahara and the castle still didn't fall. Kiyomasa sent two missionaries to persuade Yukikage to surrender, but Yukikage said "religion and military affairs are unrelated". Unfortunately, for the defenders, the Western Army had been defeated.

Hearing the tragic news, Yukikage agreed to surrender and commit seppuku in exchange that Kiyomasa would spare the life of Konishi vassals and hired them with the same salary they got under Konishi. Kiyomasa agreed and sent some sake and appetizers as a thank you.

The castle was surrendered and Yukikage committed seppuku.
