= Gregorio Céspedes =

Portuguese missionary (1551–1611)

Gregorio Céspedes (or Gregorio de Céspedes), SJ (1551–1611) was a Spanish Jesuit priest who went to Korea to do missionary work.

== Biography ==
He was born in the Toledo municipality of Villanueva de Alcardete. He studied canon law in Salamanca, where he entered the Society of Jesus in January 1569. After his novitiate, the visitor Alessandro Valignano called him to join a group of missionaries who would leave for the East in March 1574, where he would spend the next 34 years of his life. The expedition arrived in Goa in September, and there Céspedes continued his theological training for a year and a half, and was then ordained a priest. He then passed through Macau and moved to Nagasaki (Japan) in 1577, along with fourteen companions of his order.

Céspedes arrived in Busan, Korea, on 27 December 1593. He accompanied the forces commanded by Konishi Yukinaga, himself a Kirishitan daimyō, and proselytized among the Japanese soldiers during the first Japanese invasion of Korea under Toyotomi Hideyoshi. There is little evidence that he interacted directly with the Korean population, but it is believed that he did proselytize among Koreans who were being held captive by the Japanese. Four letters he wrote at that time are the first written record of the Western presence in that country. He returned to Japan in 1595, where he served as superior of the Nakatsu Church. In 1602, he founded the Kokura Church, where he lived for the last nine years of his life. Some of his correspondence was published before his death in 1611.
