= Julia Ota =

17th-century Korean Christian in Japan

Julia Ota (Japanese: ジュリアおたあ, Hepburn: Juria Otaa; Korean: 오타 주리아) was a 17th-century Korean Christian woman who became a lady-in-waiting of the Japanese shōgun Tokugawa Ieyasu, but was later exiled for her faith.

== Biography ==
Born in Korea to an aristocratic family, Julia Ota was brought to Japan at the age of 14 during the Japanese invasions of Korea (1592–98) by the leading Japanese general Konishi Yukinaga. Yukinaga was a devout Christian, and he raised her as his own in his Christian household where she lived with Yukinaga's wife. She was baptised by the Jesuit father Pedro Morejon in 1596 in Uto. Thus "Julia" was her baptismal name while "Ota" (阿瀧) was the Japanese name given to her—her original Korean name was not recorded.

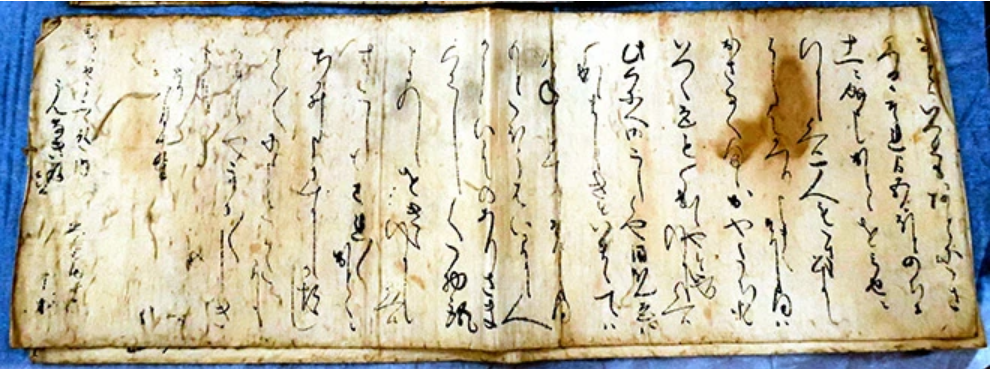
Julia Ota's hand-written letter addressed to Murata Unnaki, dated August 19, 1609

After the downfall of Konishi Yukinaga at the Battle of Sekigahara in 1600, Julia Ota was made to serve Yukinaga's vanquisher Tokugawa Ieyasu as a lady-in-waiting in his household (奥方ノ御物仕). In this role she kept in contact with the missionaries of Fushimi Castle and Sunpu Castle and continued practicing her faith, while also influencing other servants of Ieyasu's household to convert to Christianity. However, she grew restless as rumours of religious persecution in Edo reached her ears, and she made arrangements to distribute her money and belongings to the poverty-stricken Christians. Around 1609, Julia Ota heard news that a retainer of the Mōri clan by the name Murata Unnaki (村田安政) had the same birthmarks as her younger brother who was separated from her in Korea when she was 13 and he was 6. She wrote to Murata to confirm if he actually had those birthmarks. The two apparently reunited at Sunpu Castle, and Ieyasu bestowed Murata a kosode for the occasion. The kosode and Julia's letters were discovered in April 2023 and are now part of the collection of the Hagi Museum.

The Okamoto Daihachi incident came to light in 1612, which made Ieyasu suspicious of Christianity's influence on his subjects. He was thus quite alarmed to find many of his own servants were Christians, chief among them Julia Ota. She refused to recant her faith when presented with an ultimatum and would rather shave her head to renounce her attachments to the world. So Ieyasu banished her and other like-minded servants from his household and exiled her to the Izu Islands. Julia Ota was first sent to Izu Ōshima, then Nii-jima, and finally Kōzu-shima. Wherever she went, she became admired for her charity and evangelism, and she was revered as divinity on the islands up after her death up to the 20th century.

In 1619, she left Kōzu-shima and took refuge in Nagasaki, apparently having received a pardon around the time Ieyasu died. There, despite orders from the Nagasaki bugyō, she did not cease her evangelical activities and was driven out of her home multiple times. According to a letter by the Jesuit priest Francisco Pacheco dated February 15, 1622, Julia Ota was receiving financial support from Pacheco in Osaka. This was the last known record of Ota.

== Commemoration ==
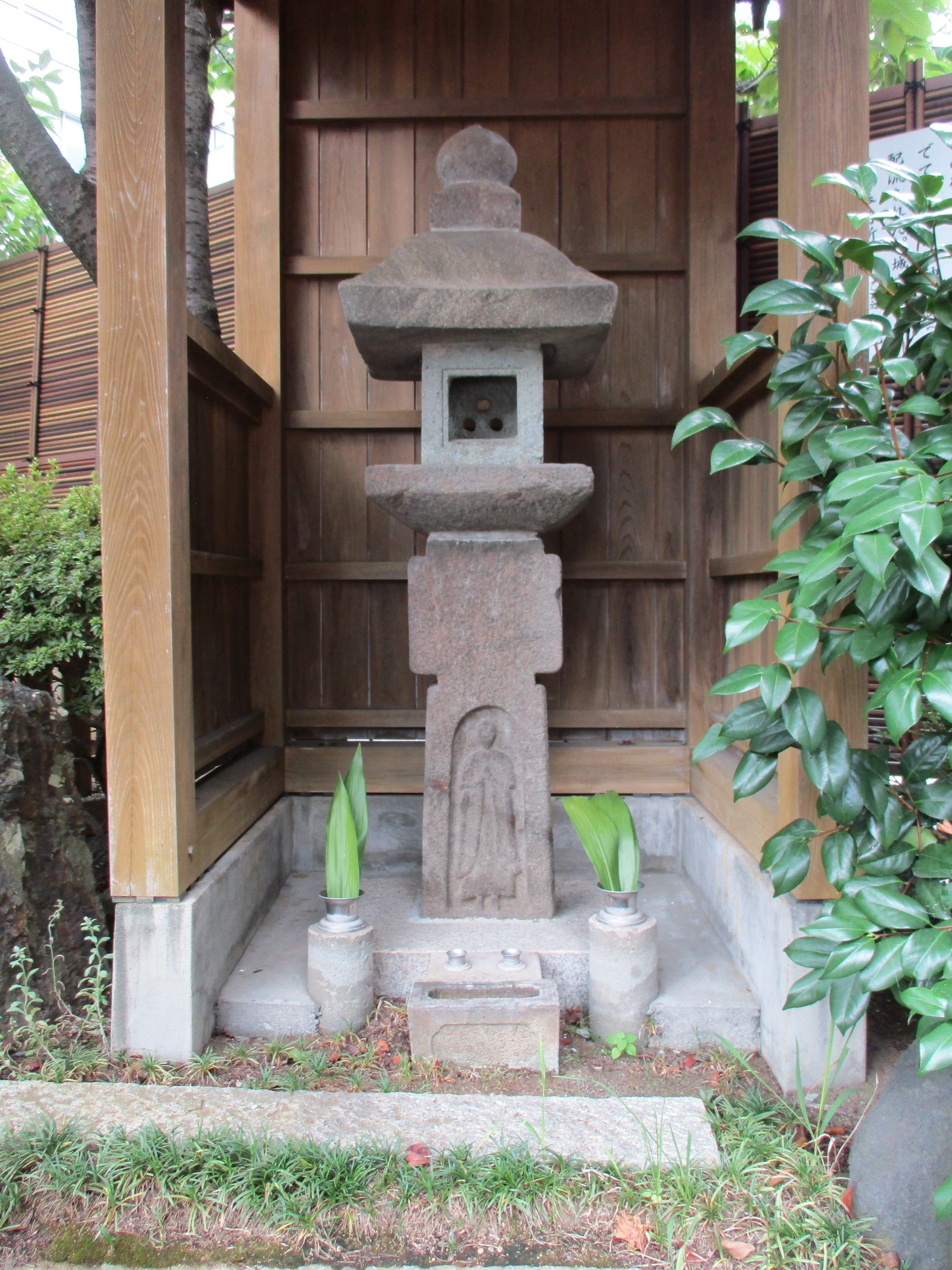
The "Kirishitan lantern" in Hōdai-in, Shizuoka. It was said that Julia Ota worshipped at this lantern before it was moved from Sunpu Castle to the temple when Christianity was banned in the castle.

Despite evidence to the contrary, there remains a number of gravesites on the Izu Islands purporting to be that of Julia Ota. On Izu Ōshima, a shrine was raised upon her alleged grave, making it a rare case of a Shinto shrine being raised over a Christian grave, and where a Christian soul was revered as a kami. Another purported grave site on Kōzu-shima was commemorated by a large crucifix erected on the island in 1958 by Japanese and Korean Christians, and a festival is held in her honour in May each year on the island. In 1972, earth from her alleged grave on Kōzu-shima was brought to Seoul's Jeoldu-san, a memorial shrine for Korean Christians, as a symbolic homecoming.

Ota was beatified along with 188 Japanese Martyrs in 2008.
