= Kirishitan =

Term for Catholics in Japan in the 16th and 17th centuries

Kirishitan 吉利支丹, 切支丹, キリシタン
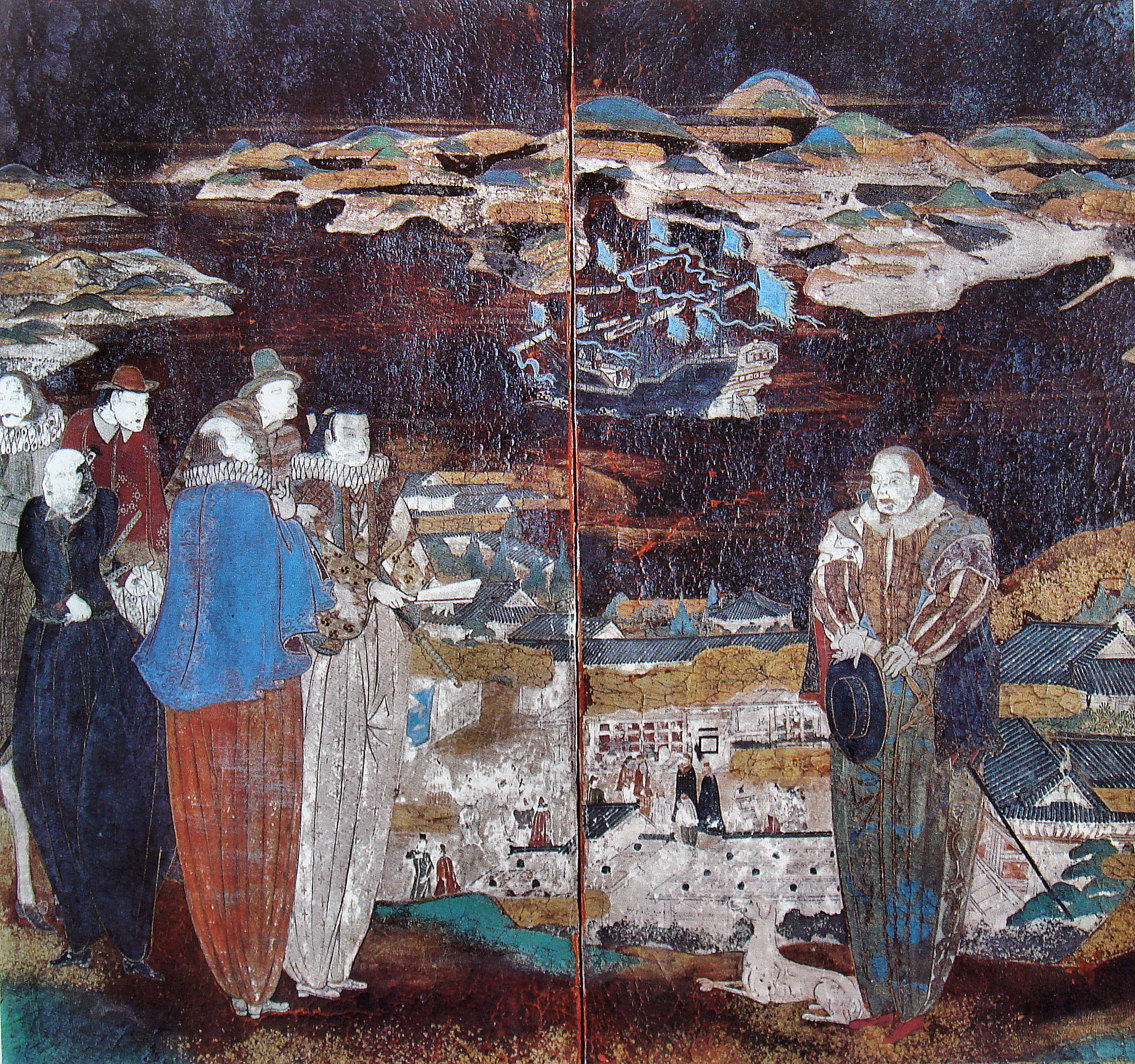
- Japanese Christians in Portuguese costume, 16th–17th century.

Founder
- Portuguese and Spanish missionaries

Regions with significant populations
- Japan, Philippines (exiled population)

Religions
- Catholic Christianity

Scriptures
- The Bible

Languages
- Latin, Japanese

The Japanese term Kirishitan (吉利支丹, 切支丹, キリシタン, きりしたん; pronounced [kʲiɾiɕi̥ꜜtaɴ]), from Portuguese cristão (cf. Kristang), meaning "Christian", referred to Catholic Christians in Japanese and is used in Japanese texts as a historiographic term for Catholics in Japan in the 16th and 17th centuries.

Modern Japanese has several words for "Christian", of which the most common are the noun form kirisuto-kyōto キリスト教徒, and also kurisuchan クリスチャン. The Japanese word kirishitan キリシタン is used primarily in Japanese texts for the early history of Roman Catholicism in Japan, or in relation to Kakure Kirishitan, hidden Christians. However, English sources on histories of Japan generally use the term "Christian" without distinction.

Christian missionaries were known as bateren (from the Portuguese word padre, "father" or "priest") or iruman (from the Portuguese irmão, "brother"). Contemptuous transcriptions such as 切支丹 and 鬼利死丹 (which use kanji with negative connotations) came into use during the Edo Period when Christianity was a forbidden religion.

Portuguese ships began arriving in Japan in 1543, with Catholic missionary activities in Japan beginning in earnest around 1549, mainly by Portuguese-sponsored Jesuits until Spanish-sponsored mendicant orders, such as the Franciscans and Dominicans, gained access to Japan. No Western women came to Japan. Of the 95 Jesuits who worked in Japan up to 1600, 57 were Portuguese, 20 were Spaniards and 18 Italian. Francis Xavier, Cosme de Torres (a Jesuit priest), and Juan Fernández were the first to arrive to Kagoshima with hopes to bring Christianity and Catholicism to Japan. At its height, Japan is estimated to have had around 300,000 Christians. Catholicism was subsequently repressed in several parts of the country and ceased to exist publicly in the 17th century.

== History ==
=== Background ===
==== Line of demarcations between Portugal and Spain ====
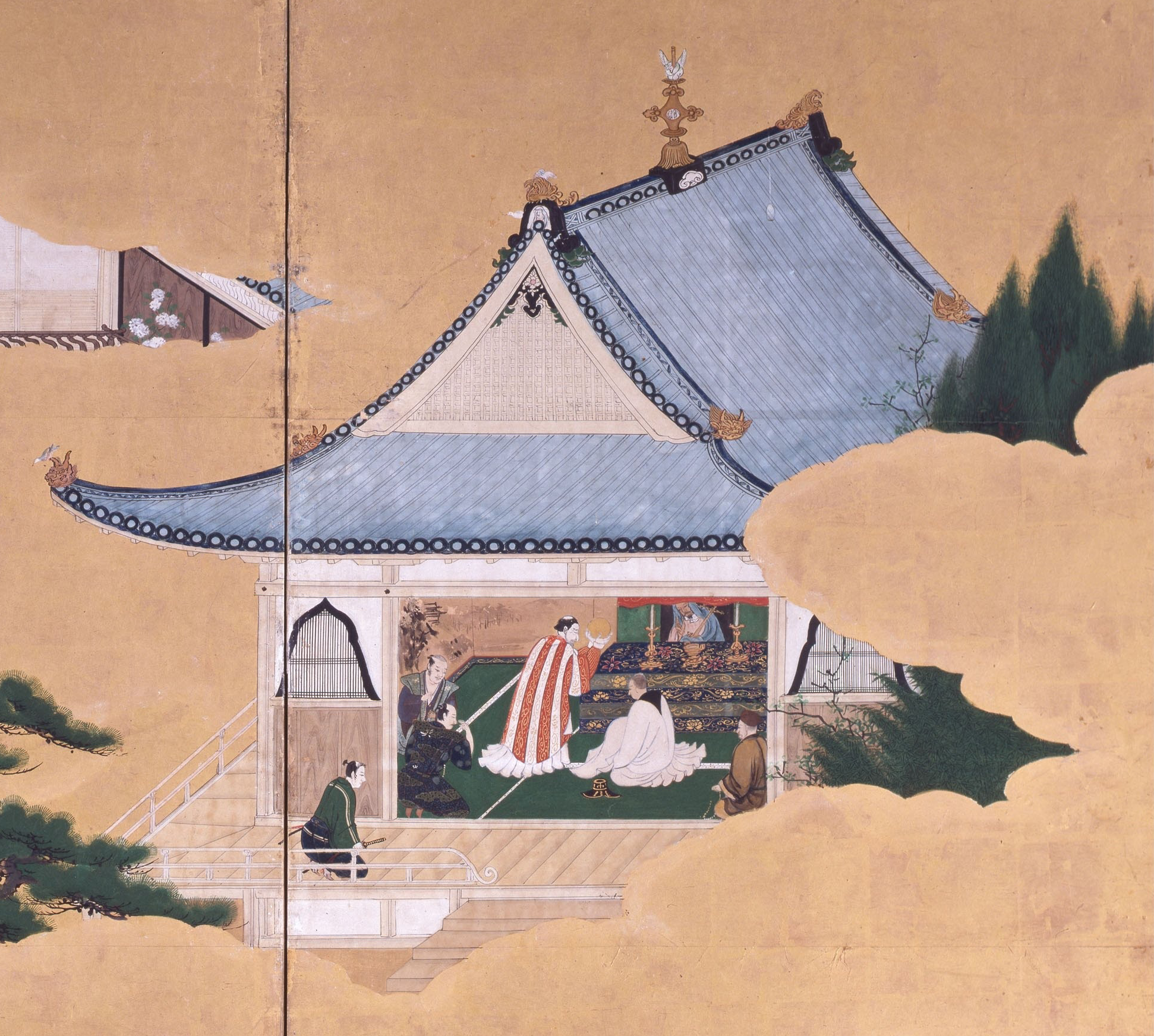
Celebrating a Christian mass in Japan.

Religion was an integral part of the state and evangelization was seen as having both secular and spiritual benefits for both Portugal and Spain. Indeed, Pope Alexander VI's Bulls of Donation (1493) commanded the Catholic Monarchs to take such steps. Wherever Spain and Portugal attempted to expand their territories or influence, missionaries would soon follow. By the Treaty of Tordesillas (1494), the two powers divided the world between them into exclusive spheres of influence, trade and colonization. Although, at the time of the demarcation, neither nation had any direct contact with Japan, that nation fell into the sphere of the Portuguese.

The countries disputed the allocation of Japan. Since neither could colonize it, the exclusive right to propagate Christianity in Japan meant the exclusive right to trade with Japan. Portuguese-sponsored Jesuits under Alessandro Valignano took the lead in proselytizing in Japan over the objection of the Spaniards, starting in 1579. The fait accompli was approved in Pope Gregory XIII's papal bull of 1575, which decided that Japan belonged to the Portuguese Diocese of Macau. In 1588, the diocese of Funai (Nagasaki) was founded under Portuguese protection.

In rivalry with the Jesuits, Spanish-sponsored mendicant orders entered into Japan via Manila. In addition to criticizing Jesuit activities, they actively lobbied the Pope. Their campaigns resulted in Pope Clement VIII's decree of 1600, which allowed Spanish friars to enter Japan via the Portuguese Indies, and Pope Paul V's decree of 1608, which abolished the restrictions on the route. The Portuguese accused Spanish Jesuits of working for their homeland instead of their religion. The power struggle between Jesuits and mendicant orders caused a schism within the diocese of Funai. Furthermore, mendicant orders tried in vain to establish a diocese on the Tōhoku region that was to be independent from the Portuguese one.

The Roman Catholic world order was challenged by the Netherlands and England. Its principle was repudiated by Grotius's Mare Liberum. In the early 17th century, Japan built trade relations with the Netherlands and England. Although England withdrew from the operations within ten years under James I due to a lack of profitability, the Netherlands continued to trade with Japan and became the only European country that maintained trade relations with Japan until the 19th century. As trade competitors, the Protestant countries engaged in a campaign against Catholicism, and this subsequently adversely affected shogunate policies toward the Iberian kingdoms.

Portugal's and Spain's colonial policies were also challenged by the Roman Catholic Church itself. The Vatican founded the Congregatio de Propaganda Fide in 1622 and attempted to separate the churches from the influence of the Iberian kingdoms. However, it was too late for Japan. The organization failed to establish staging points in Japan.

=== Propagation strategy ===
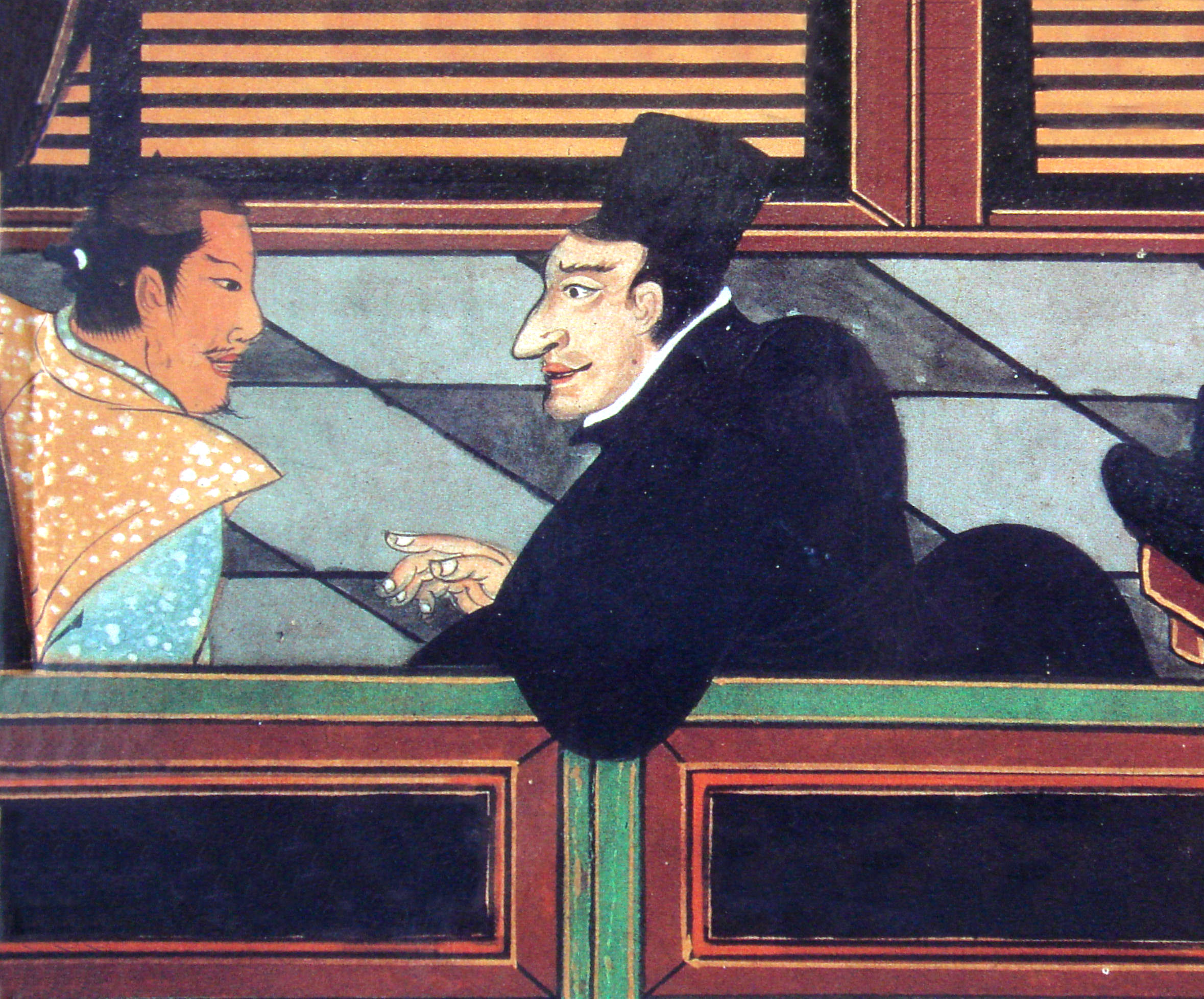
A Jesuit with a samurai, circa 1600.

The Jesuits believed that it was better to seek to influence people in power and then allow the religion to be passed downwards to the commoners later. They tried to avoid suspicion by not preaching to the commoners without permission from the local rulers to propagate Catholicism within their domains. As a result, several daimyō became Christians, soon to be followed by many of their subjects as the Dominicans and Augustinians were able to begin preaching to the commoners.

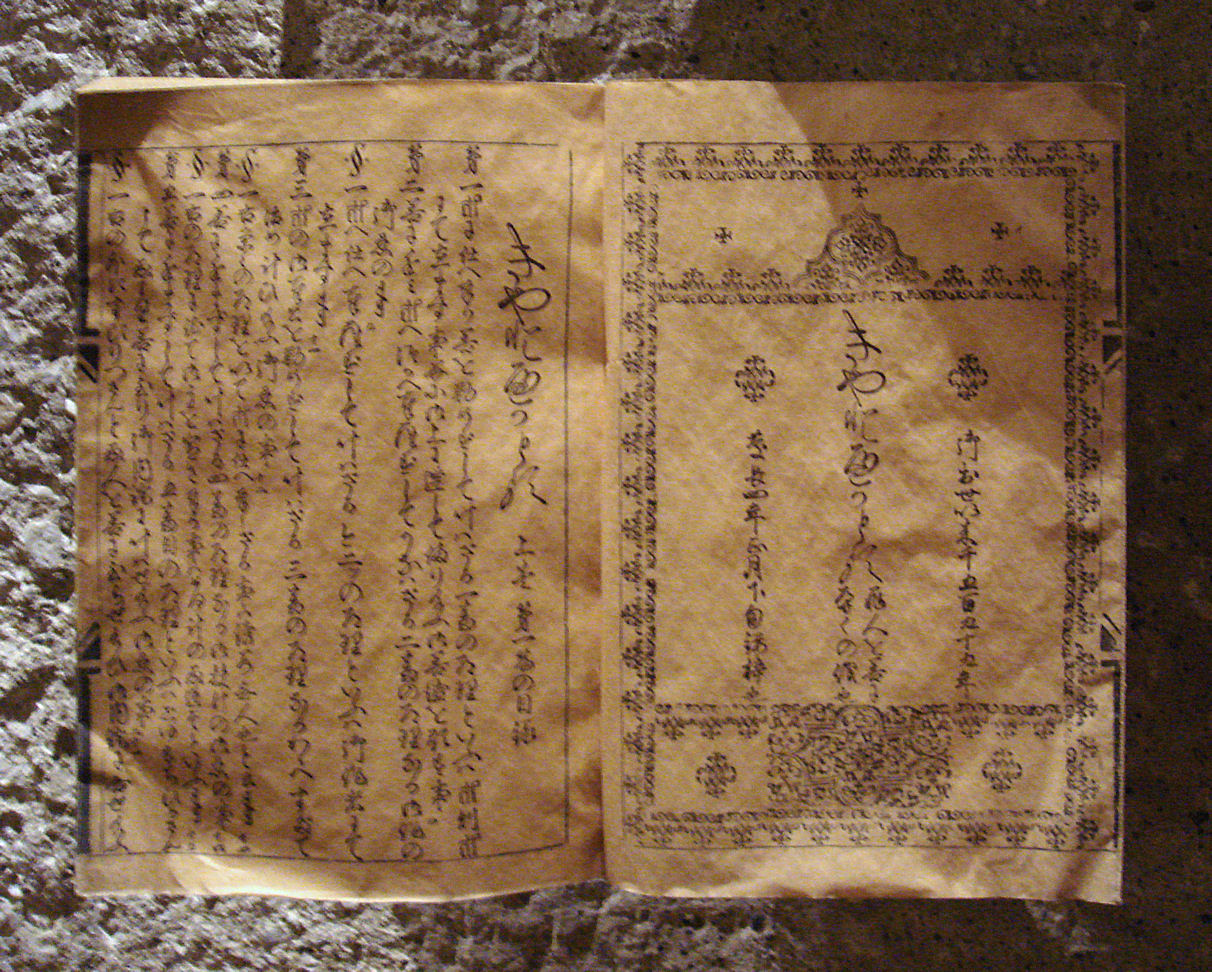
Kirishitan book in Japanese, 16th century.

Having a religious background, Takahisa showed himself to be benevolent and already allowed freedom of worship but not helping the missionaries nor favoring their church. Failing to find a way to the centre of affairs, the court of the Emperor, Xavier soon tired and left to Yamaguchi thus beginning the Yamaguchi period.

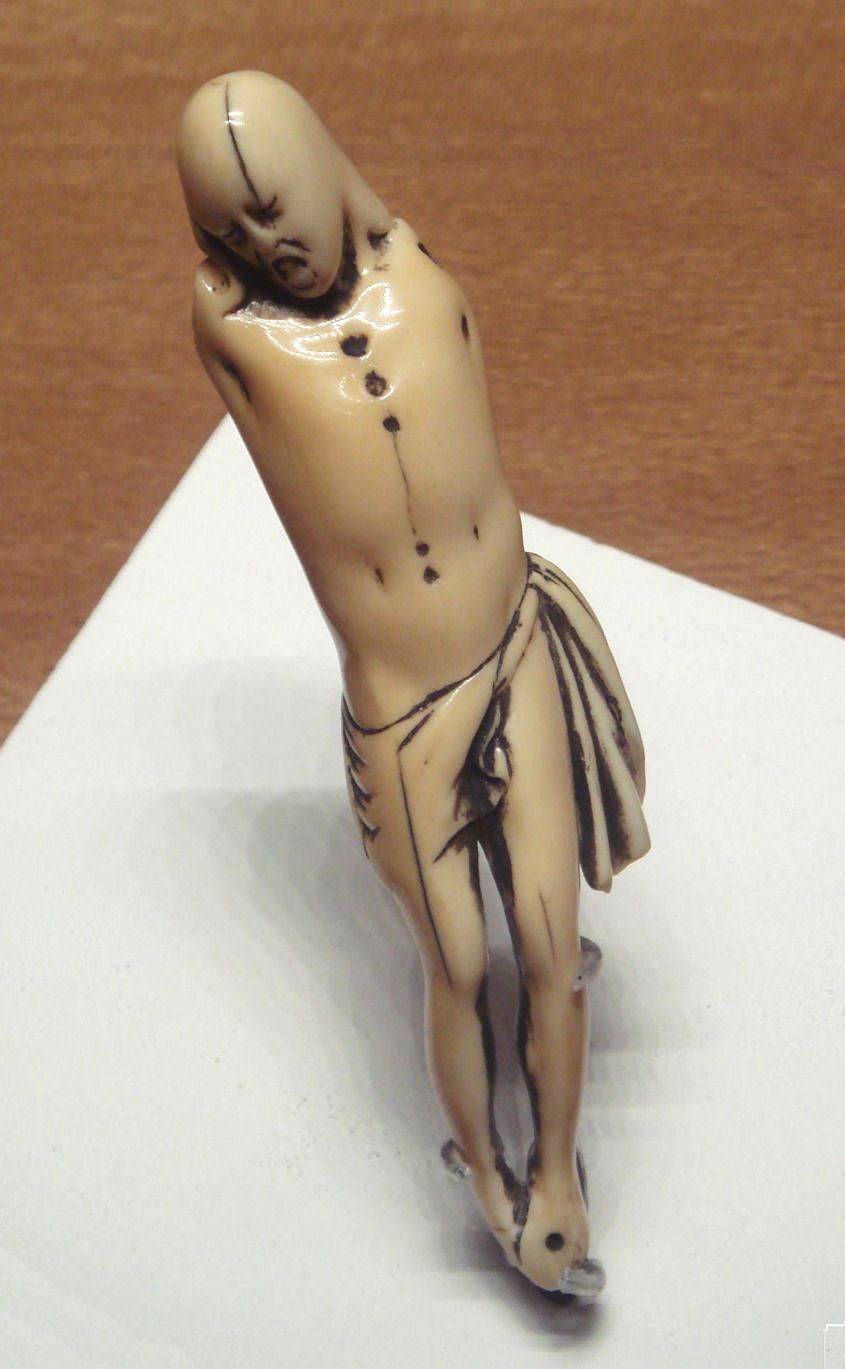
Netsuke depicting Christ, 17th century, Japan.

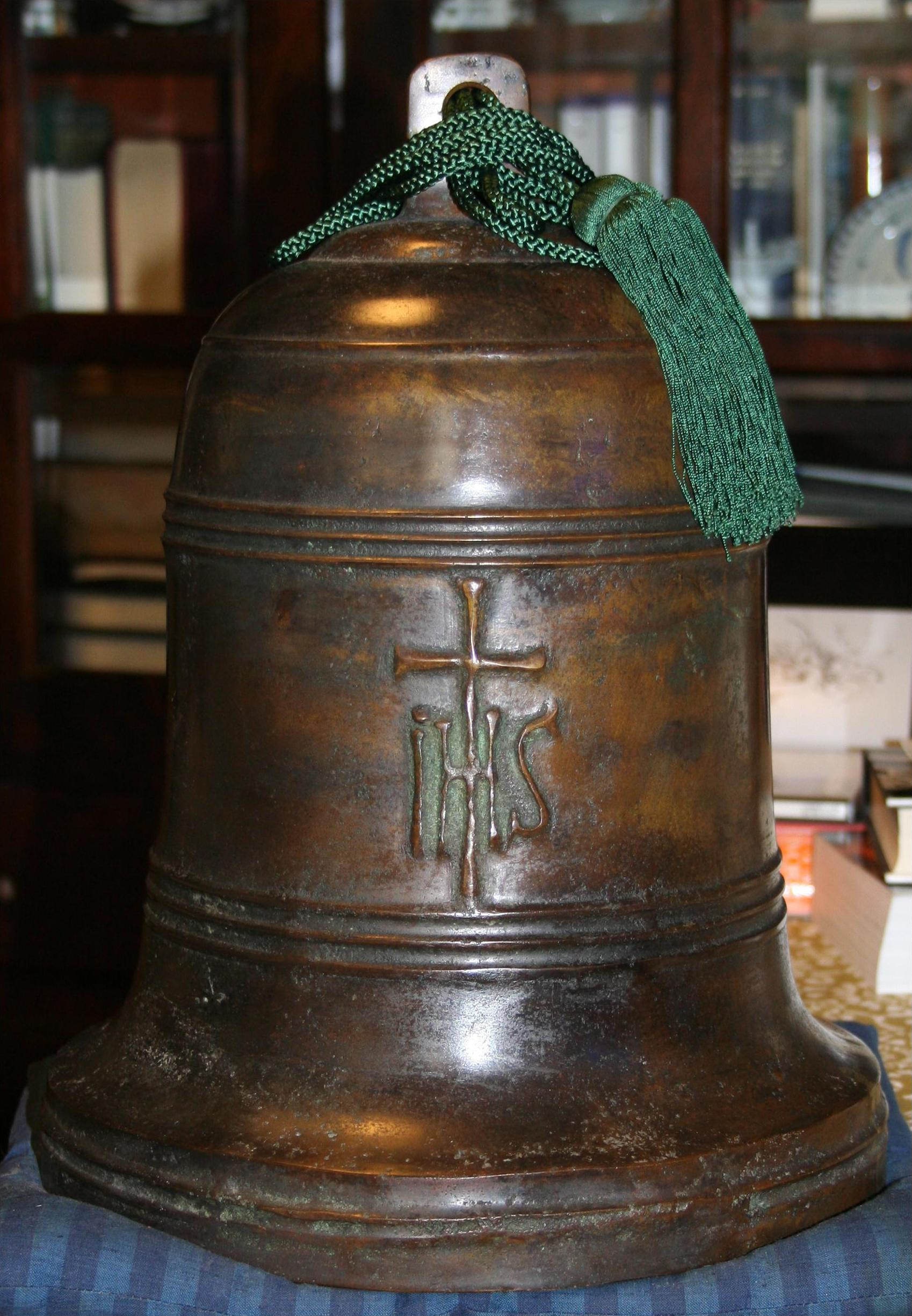
Japanese-Portuguese Bell Inscribed 1570, Nantoyōsō Collection, Japan

=== Early policy toward Catholicism ===
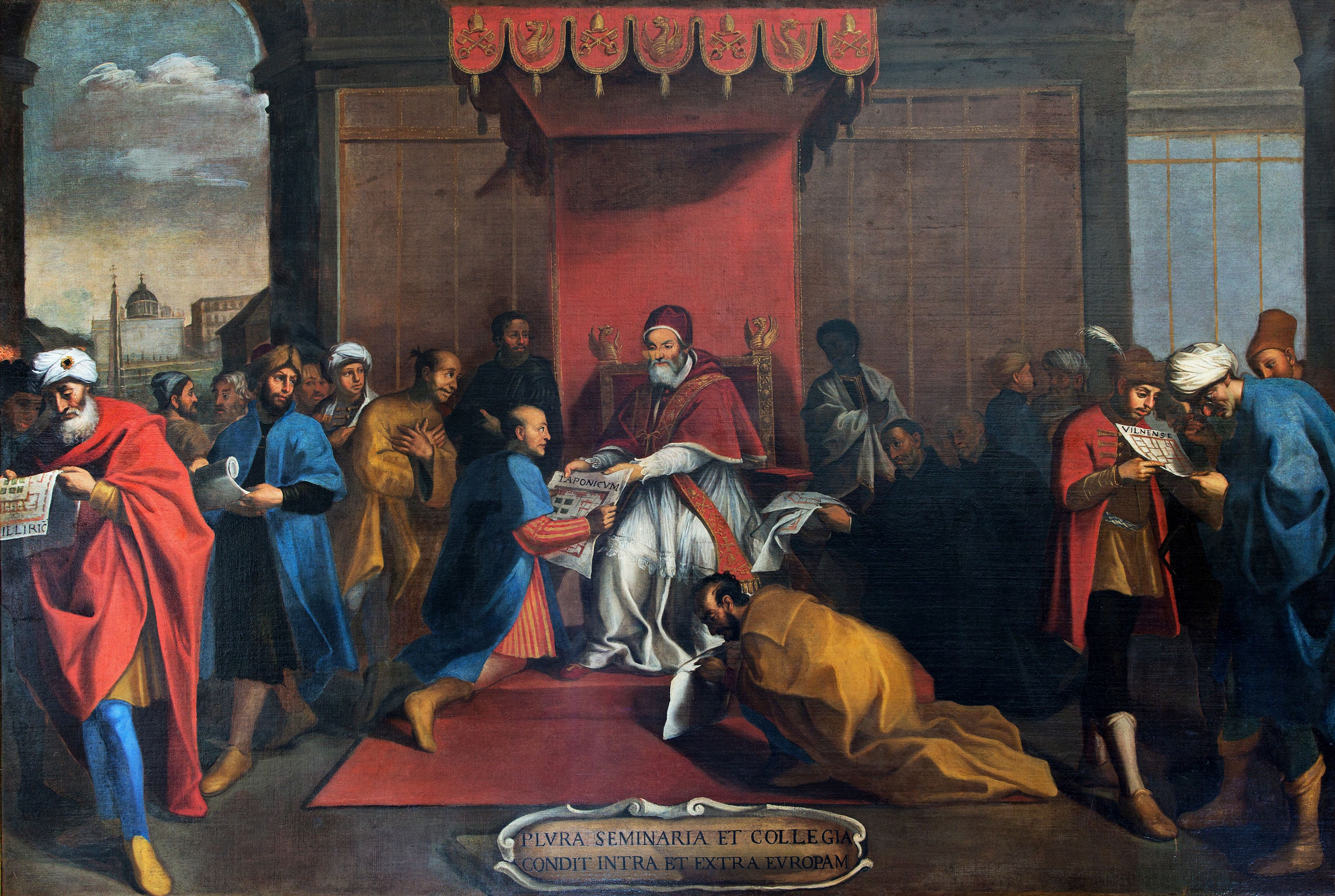
The Japanese embassy of Itō Mancio, with Pope Gregory XIII in 1585

Christians refer positively to Oda Nobunaga, who died in the middle of the unification of Japan. He favored the Jesuit missionary Luís Fróis and generally tolerated Christianity. But overall, he undertook no remarkable policies toward Catholicism. Actually, Catholic power in his domain was trivial because he did not conquer western Japan, where the Jesuits were based. By 1579, at the height of missionary activity, there were about 130,000 converts.

=== Toyotomi Hideyoshi and the Christian daimyōs ===
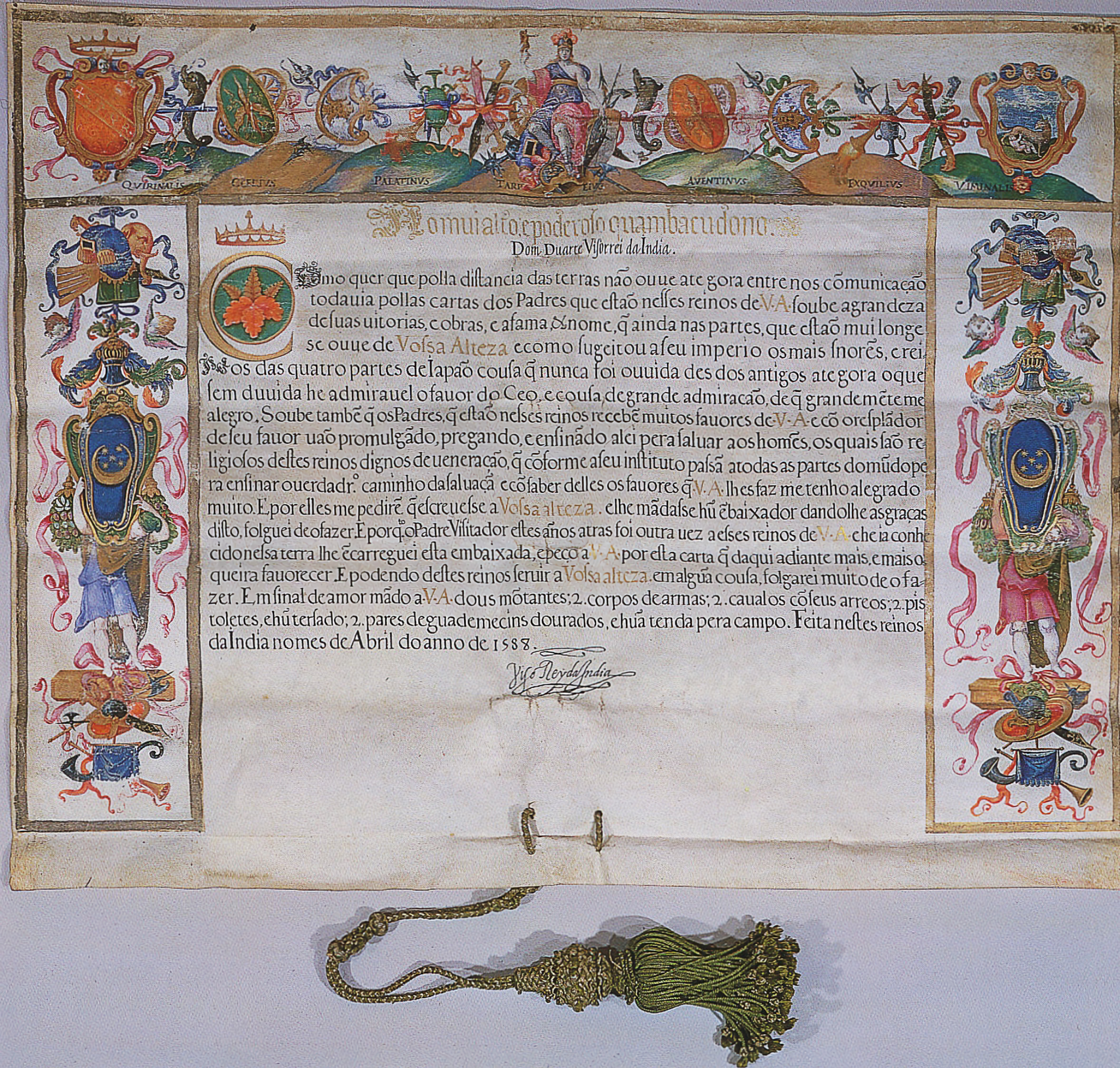
Letter from Duarte de Meneses, viceroy of Portuguese India, to daimyō Toyotomi Hideyoshi dated April 1588, concerning the suppression of Christians, a National Treasure of Japan

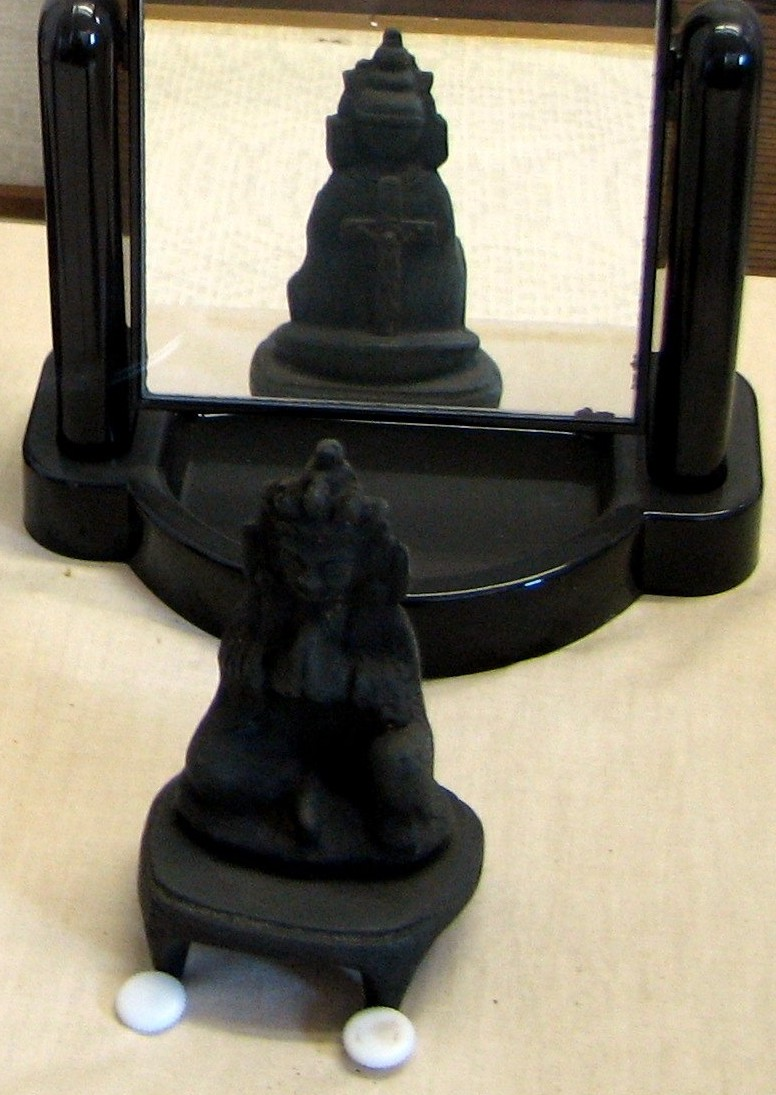
Buddhist statue with hidden crucifix on back, used by Christians in Japan to hide their real beliefs

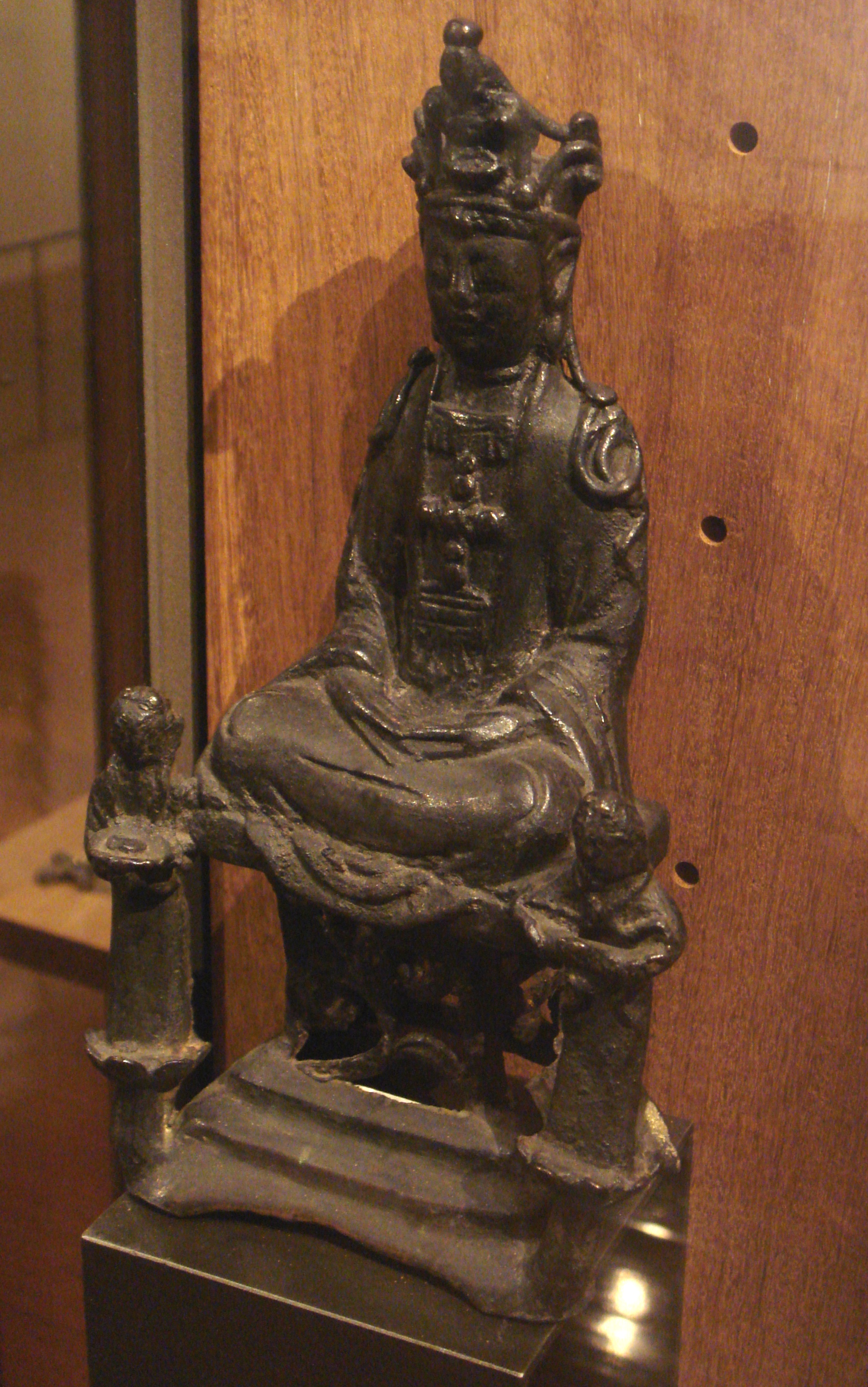
The Virgin Mary disguised as Kannon, Kirishitan cult, 17th century Japan. Salle des Martyrs, Paris Foreign Missions Society.

The situation was changed when Toyotomi Hideyoshi reunified Japan. Once he became the ruler of Japan, Hideyoshi began to pay attention to external threats, particularly the expansion of European power in East Asia. The turning point for Catholic missions was the San Felipe incident, where in an attempt to recover his cargo, the Spanish captain of a shipwrecked trading vessel claimed that the missionaries were there to prepare Japan for conquest. These claims made Hideyoshi suspicious of the foreign religion. He attempted to curb Catholicism while maintaining good trading relations with Portugal and Spain, which might have provided military support to Dom Justo Takayama, a Christian daimyō in western Japan. Many daimyōs converted to Christianity in order to gain more favorable access to saltpeter, used to make gunpowder. Between 1553 and 1620, eighty-six daimyōs were officially baptized, and many more were sympathetic to the Christians.

By 1587, Hideyoshi had become alarmed by reports that Christian lords oversaw forced conversions of retainers and commoners, that they had garrisoned the city of Nagasaki, that they participated in the slave trade of other Japanese and, apparently offending Hideyoshi's Buddhist sentiments, that they allowed the slaughter of horses and oxen for food. After his invasion of Kyushu, Hideyoshi Toyotomi promulgated the Purge Directive Order to the Jesuits (バテレン追放令, bateren tsuihō rei) on July 24, 1587. It consists of 11 articles: "No. 10. Do not sell Japanese people to the Nanban (Portuguese)." Among the contents were a ban on missionaries. The Jesuits in Nagasaki considered armed resistance, but the plans did not come to fruition.

However, the 1587 decree was not particularly enforced. In contrast to the Jesuits, the Dominicans, Franciscans, and Augustinians were openly preaching to the common peoples; this caused Hideyoshi to become concerned that commoners with divided loyalties might lead to dangerous rebels like the Ikkō-ikki sect of earlier years; this led to Hideyoshi putting the 26 Martyrs of Japan followers to death in 1597 on his order. After Hideyoshi died in 1598, amidst the chaos of succession there was less of a focus on persecuting Christians.

=== Expansion ===
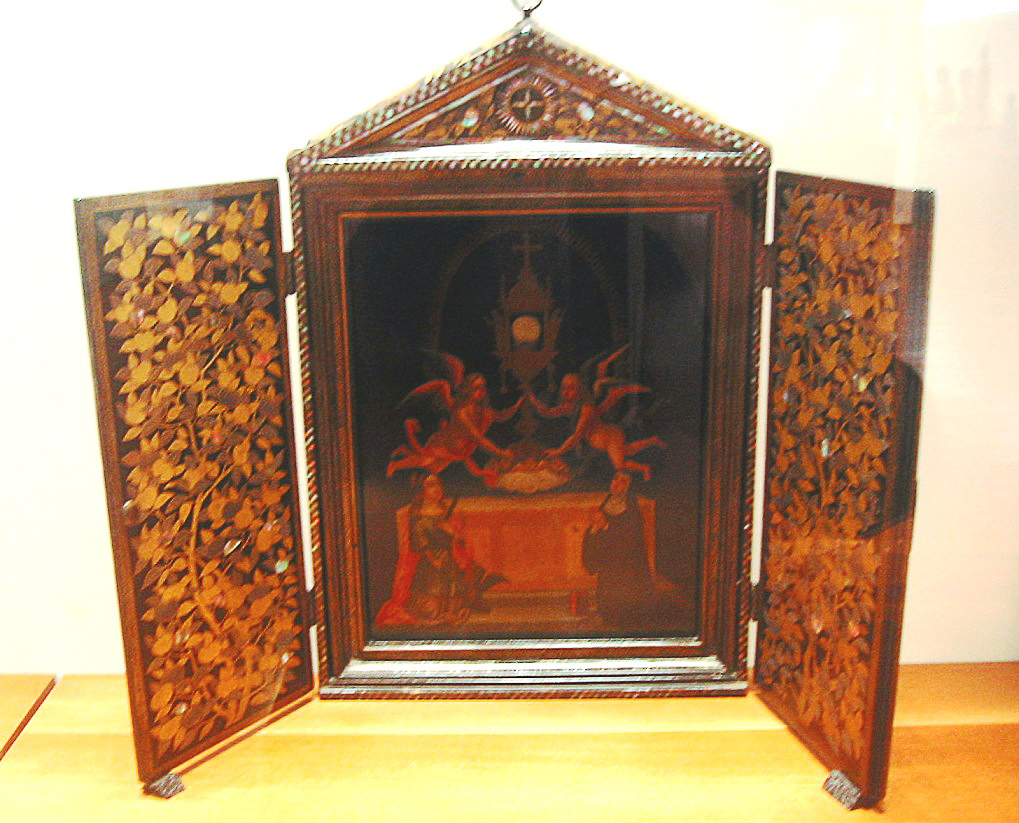
A Japanese votive altar, Nanban style. End of the 16th century. Guimet Museum.

Most Japanese Christians lived in Kyushu, but Christianization was not a regional phenomenon and had a national impact. By the end of the 16th century it was possible to find baptized people in virtually every province of Japan, many of them organized in communities. On the eve of the Sekigahara battle, fifteen daimyōs were baptized, and their domains stretched from Hyūga in Southeast Kyushu to Dewa in North Honshū.

In June 1592, Hideyoshi invaded Korea; among his leading generals was Christian daimyō Konishi Yukinaga. The actions of his forces in the massacre and enslavement of many of the Korean people were indistinguishable from the non-Christian Japanese forces that participated in the invasion. After Konishi's loss in the battle of Sekigahara, Konishi would base his refusal to commit seppuku on his Christian beliefs; instead of taking his own life, he chose capture and execution.

The 1592 war between Japan and Korea also provided Westerners with a rare opportunity to visit Korea. Under orders of Gomaz, the Jesuit Gregorious de Cespedes arrived in Korea with a Japanese monk for the purpose of administering to the Japanese troops. He stayed there for approximately 18 months, until April or May 1595, thus being on record as the first European missionary to visit the Korean peninsula, but was unable to make any inroads. The Annual Letters of Japan made a substantial contribution to the introduction of Korea to Europe, Francis Xavier having crossed paths with Korean envoys dispatched to Japan during 1550 and 1551.

The Japanese missions were economically self-sufficient. Nagasaki's misericórdias became rich and powerful institutions which every year received large donations. The brotherhood grew in numbers to over 100 by 1585 and 150 in 1609. Controlled by the elite of Nagasaki, and not by Portuguese, it had two hospitals (one for lepers) and a large church. By 1606, there already existed a feminine religious order called Miyako no Bikuni ("nuns of Kyoto") which accepted Korean converts such as Marina Pak, baptized in Nagasaki.

=== Tokugawa response ===
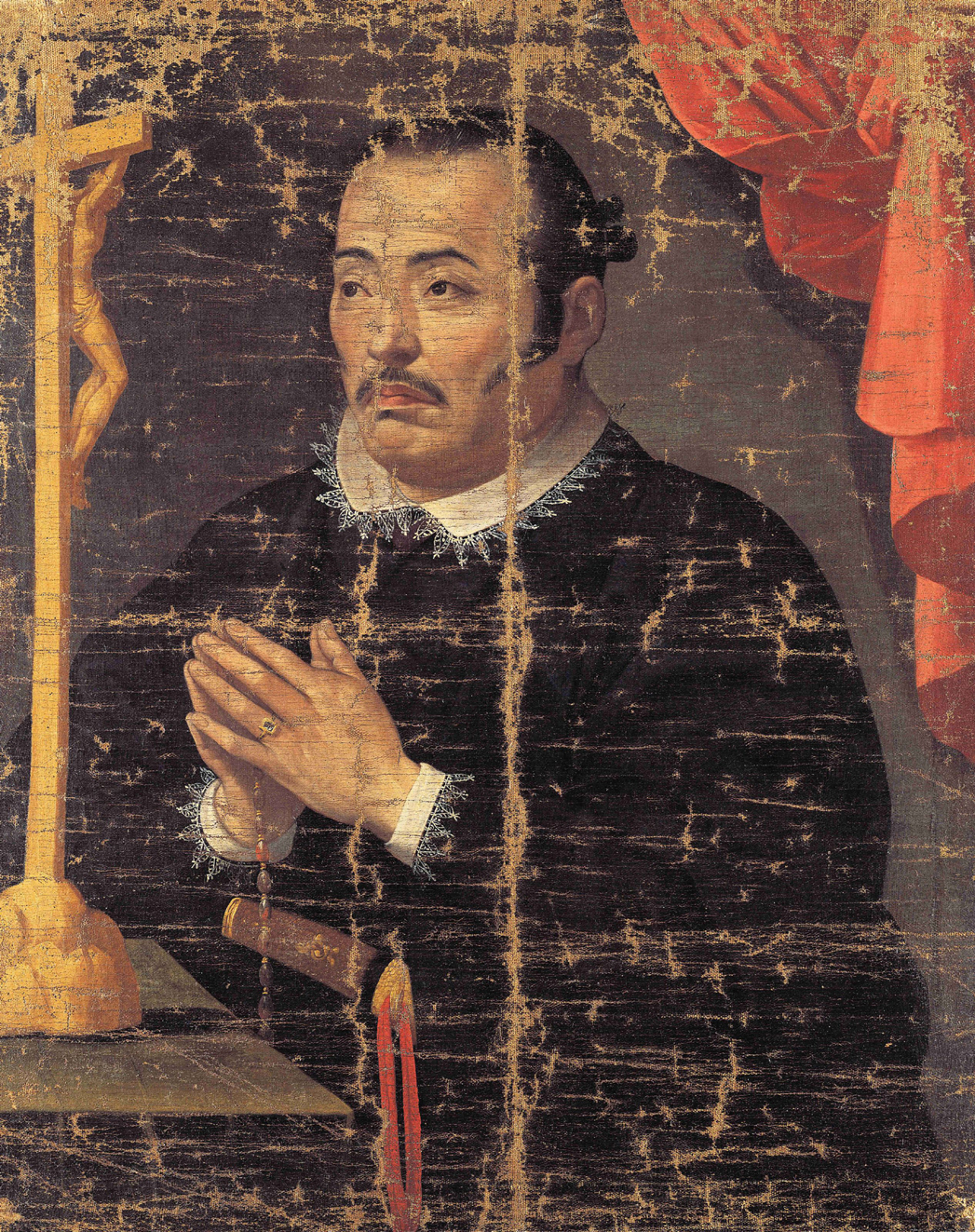
Hasekura Tsunenaga converted to Catholicism in Madrid in 1615.

The Tokugawa shogunate finally decided to ban Catholicism. The statement on the "Expulsion of all missionaries from Japan", drafted by Zen monk Konchiin Suden (1563–1633) and issued in 1614 under the name of second shogun Hidetada (ruled 1605–1623), was considered the first official statement of a comprehensive control of Kirishitan. It claimed that the Christians were bringing disorder to Japanese society and that their followers "contravene governmental regulations, traduce Shinto, calumniate the True Law, destroy regulations, and corrupt goodness". It was fully implemented and canonized as one of the fundamental Tokugawan laws. In the same year, the bakufu required all subjects of all domains to register at their local Buddhist temple; this would become an annual requirement in 1666, cementing the Buddhist temples as an instrument of state control.

The immediate cause of the prohibition was the Okamoto Daihachi incident, a case of fraud involving Ieyasu's Catholic vavasor, but there were also other reasons behind it. The shogunate was concerned about a possible invasion by the Iberian colonial powers, which had previously occurred in the New World and the Philippines. Domestically, the ban was closely related to measures against the Toyotomi clan. The Buddhist ecclesiastical establishment was made responsible for verifying that a person was not a Christian through what became known as the "temple guarantee system" (terauke seido). By the 1630s, people were being required to produce a certificate of affiliation with a Buddhist temple as proof of religious orthodoxy, social acceptability and loyalty to the regime.

In the mid-17th century, the shogunate demanded the expulsion of all European missionaries and the execution of all converts. This marked the end of open Christianity in Japan. The bakufu erected bulletin boards nationwide at crossroads and bridges; among the many proscriptions listed on these boards were strict warnings against Christianity.

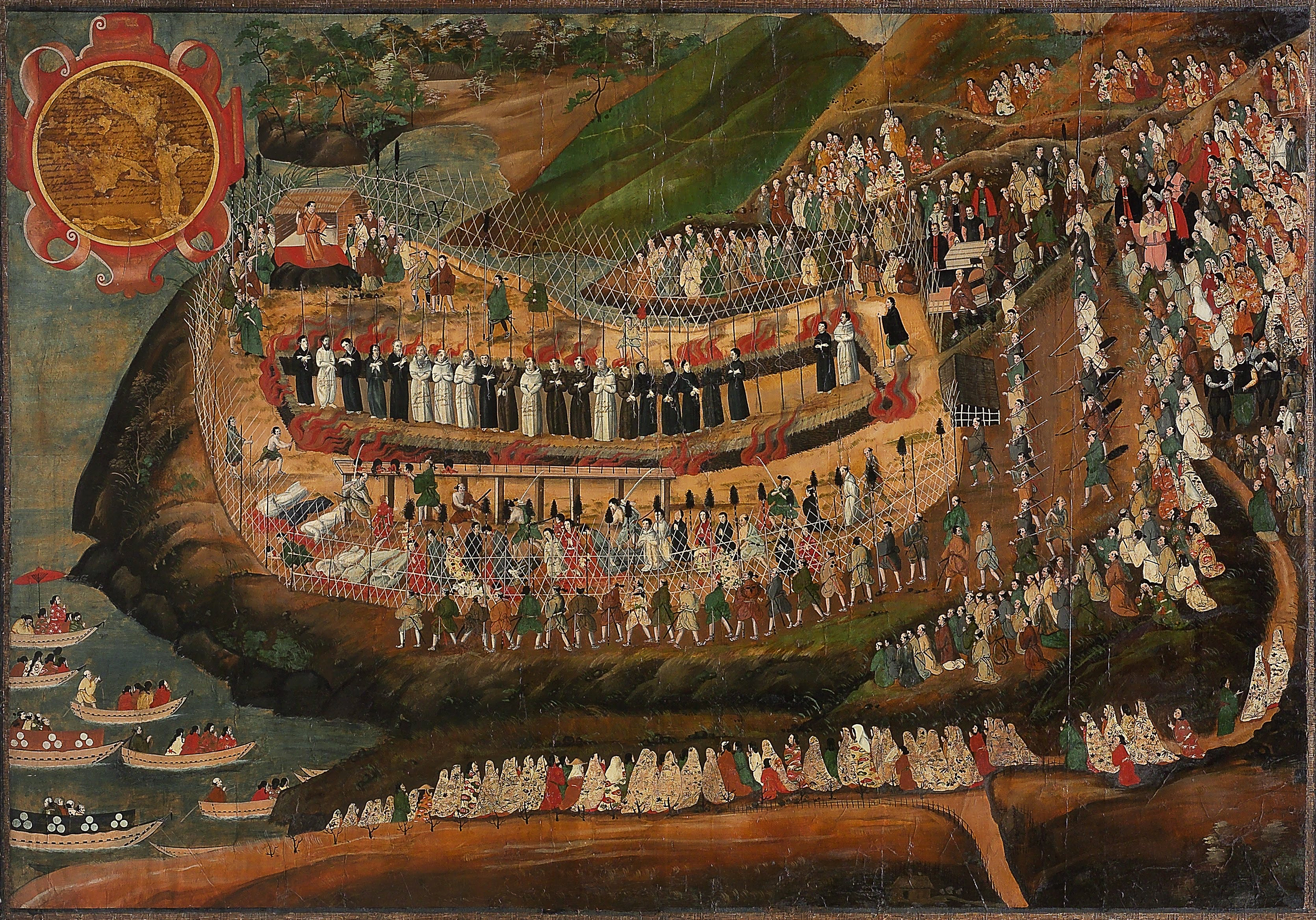
The Christian martyrs of the 1622 Great Genna Martyrdom. 17th-century Japanese painting.

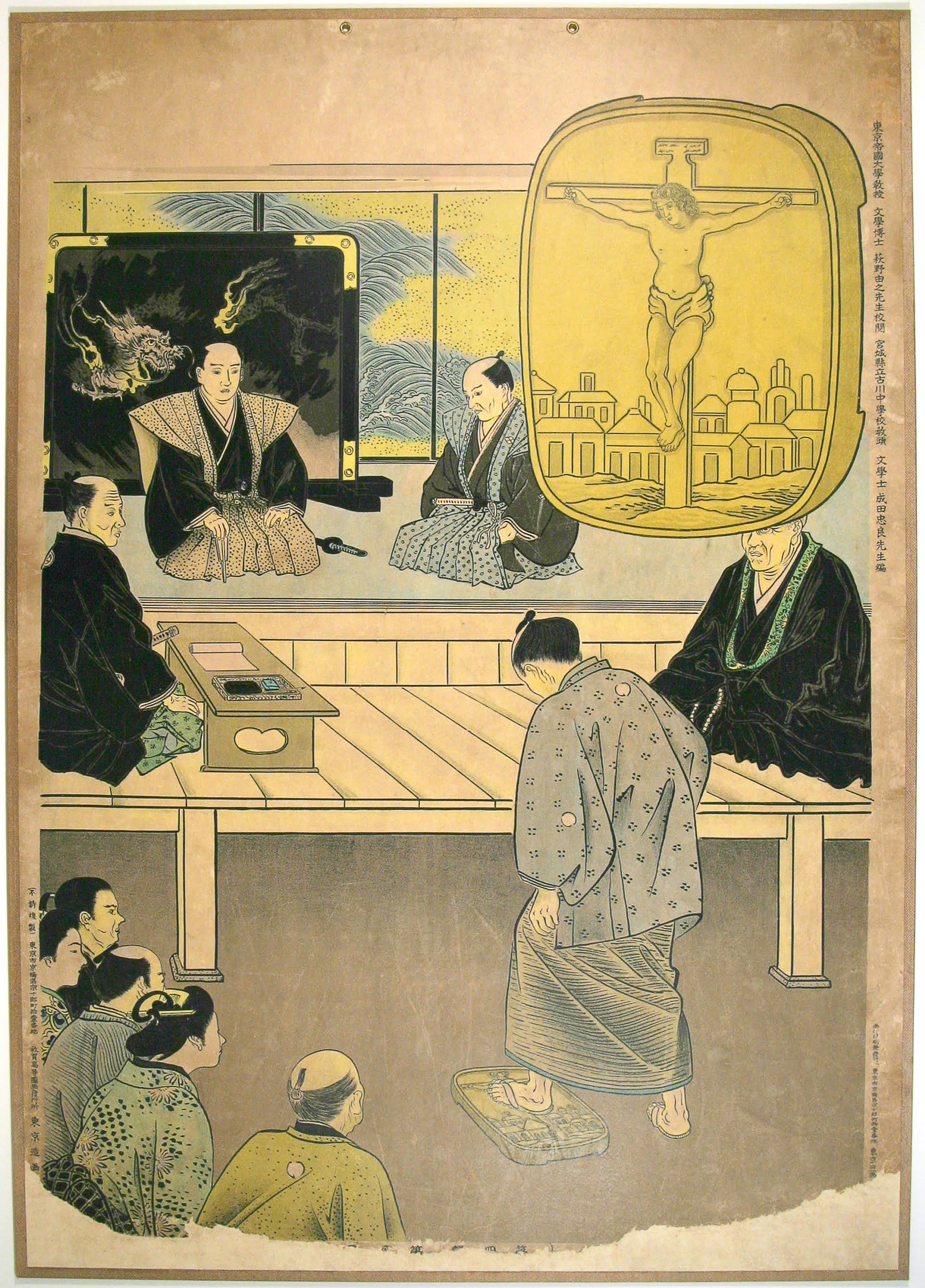
Fumi-e to expose Christians by the Tokugawa Shogunate

The number of active Christians is estimated to have been around 200,000 in 1582.

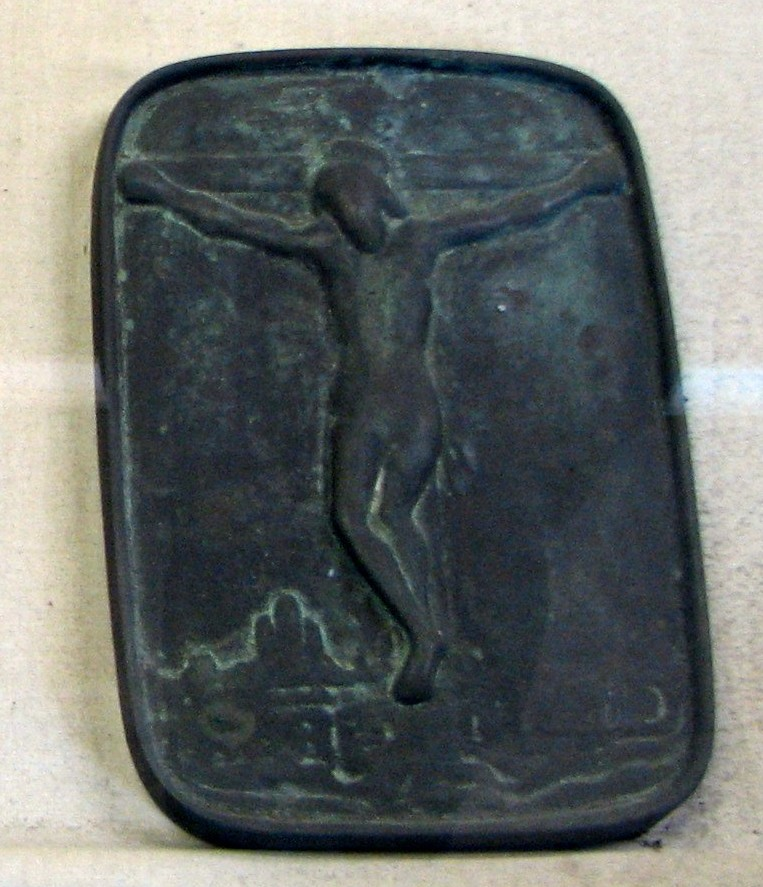
Fumi-e, a picture of Christ used to reveal practicing Christians

The Japanese government used fumi-e to reveal practicing Catholics and sympathizers. Fumi-e were pictures of the Virgin Mary or Christ. People reluctant to step on the pictures were identified as Christian and taken to Nagasaki. If they refused to renounce their religion, they were tortured; those who still refused were executed.

==== Later persecution ====
The Shimabara Rebellion, led by a young Christian man named Amakusa Shirō Tokisada, took place against the shogunate in 1637. The rebellion broke out over economic desperation and government oppression but later assumed a religious tone. About 27,000 people joined the uprising, but it was crushed by the shogunate after a sustained campaign. The reigning shogun, Tokugawa Iemitsu, who had issued the Sakoku Edict, restricting trade and effectively isolating Japan, two years earlier, came down hard on the Christians. Many Japanese were deported to Macau or to Spanish Philippines. Many Macanese and Japanese-Filipino Mestizos are the mixed-race descendants of the deported Japanese Catholics. About 400 were officially deported by the government to Macau and Manila, but thousands of Japanese were pressured into moving voluntarily. About 10,000 Macanese and 3,000 Japanese were moved to Manila.

The Catholic remnant in Japan were driven underground, and its members became known as the "Hidden Christians". Some priests remained in Japan illegally, including 18 Jesuits, seven Franciscans, seven Dominicans, one Augustinian, five seculars and an unknown number of Jesuit irmao and dojuku. Since this time corresponds to the Thirty Years' War between Catholics and Protestants in Germany, it is possible that the checking of Catholic power in Europe reduced the flow of funds to the Catholic missions in Japan, which could be why they failed at this time and not before. During the Edo period, the Kakure Kirishitans kept their faith. Biblical phrases or prayers were transferred orally from parent to child, and secret posts (mizukata) were assigned in their underground community to baptize their children, all while regional governments continuously operated fumi-e to expose Christians.

=== Rediscovery and return ===
Japan was forced to open to foreign interaction by Matthew Perry in 1853. It became possible for foreigners to live in Japan with the Harris Treaty in 1858. Many Christian clergymen were sent from Catholic, Protestant and Orthodox churches, though proselytizing was still banned. In 1865, some of the Japanese who lived in Urakami village near Nagasaki visited the new Ōura Church which had been built by the Paris Foreign Missions Society (Missions étrangères de Paris) barely a month before. A female member of the group spoke to a French priest, Bernard Petitjean, and confessed that their families had kept the Kirishitan faith. Those Kirishitan wanted to see the statue of St. Mary with their own eyes, and to confirm that the priest was single and truly came from the pope in Rome. After this interview, many Kirishitan thronged toward Petitjean. He investigated their underground organizations and discovered that they had kept the rite of baptism and the liturgical years without European priests for nearly 250 years. Petitjean's report surprised the Christian world; Pope Pius IX called it a miracle.

The Edo Shogunate's edicts banning Christianity were still on the books, however, and thus the religion continued to be persecuted up to 1867, the last year of its rule. Robert Bruce Van Valkenburgh, the American minister-resident in Japan, privately complained of this persecution to the Nagasaki magistrates, though little action was taken to stop it. The succeeding government under Emperor Meiji, who took over from the Tokugawa shogunate in 1868, initially continued in this vein and several thousand people were exiled (Urakami Yoban Kuzure). After Europe and the U.S. began to vocally criticize the persecution, the Japanese government realized that it needed to lift the ban in order to attain its interests. In 1873 the ban was lifted. Numerous exiles returned and began construction of the Urakami Cathedral, which was completed in 1895.

It was later revealed that tens of thousands of Kirishitan still survived in some regions near Nagasaki. Some officially returned to the Roman Catholic Church. Others remained apart from the Catholic Church and have stayed as Kakure Kirishitan, retaining their own traditional beliefs and their descendants asserting that they keep their ancestors' religion. However, it became difficult for them to keep their community and rituals, so they have converted to Buddhism or Shinto eventually. When John Paul II visited Nagasaki in 1981, he baptized some young people from Kakure Kirishitan families, a rare occurrence.

== Kirishitan grave in Minamishimabara ==
A gravestone was discovered in Nishiarie-machi, Minamishimabara, Nagasaki in 1929. It is located in a seaside communal cemetery on the southern coast of the Shimabara Peninsula, overlooking Amakusa Sea to the south. It is a semi-cylindrical kamaboko shape with a total length of 1.21 meters, width of 0.56 meters, and height of 0.39 meters, made of sandstone from Amakusa, commonly known as "Amakusa stone". A cross is engraved on the top and front of the monument, and the back is engraved in Roman letters with the words "Hiri (Hori) Sakuemon Diego, 83 years old since birth, October 16, 1610, Keicho 15," making it the oldest inscription in Roman letters in Japan. Of the approximately known 150 Kirishitan gravestones in Japan, about 130 are on the Shimabara Peninsula, but after the Shimabara Rebellion, Shugendō became popular among the people who migrated to the peninsula, and many of the Kirishitan gravestones were spared destruction as they were believed by the newcomers to be graves of early mountain priests. The tombstone is now protected by a glass-walled structure, and was designated a National Historic Site for its importance in understanding the state of Christian missionary work in the early Edo period.

== Notable Kirishitans ==
=== Kirishitan daimyōs ===
- Ōmura Sumitada, first Christian feudal lord (1533–1587)
- Ōmura Yoshiaki (1568–1615)
- Arima Harunobu, Christian name Dom Protasio, Lord of Shimabara (1567–1612)
- Arima Naozumi (1586–1641)
- Kuroda Yoshitaka, Dom Simeao, a chief strategist of Hideyoshi's (1546–1604)
- Kuroda Nagamasa (黒田 長政, December 3, 1568 – August 29, 1623)
- Konishi Yukinaga, Dom Agostinho, chief member of Hideyoshi's field staff (1555–1600)
- Dom Justo Takayama Ukon, daimyō of Akashi, chosen life of exile in Manila, Philippines (1552–1615)
- Gamō Ujisato (1556–1595)
- Ōtomo Sōrin (大友 宗麟) (1530–1587), also known as Fujiwara no Yoshishige (藤原 義鎮) and Ōtomo Yoshishige (大友 義鎮). Christian name Dom Francisco; referred to as the "King of Bungo" by the Jesuits
- Ōtomo Yoshimune (大友 義統), Constantino
- Ōtomo Chikaie (大友 親家), Dom Sebastin (1561–1641)
- Ōtomo Chikamori (大友 親盛)
- Oda Hidenobu, Christian name Peter (1580–1605)
- Tsugaru Nobuhira (1586–1631)

=== Other ===
- Twenty-six Martyrs of Japan
- Paulo Miki (1563–1596)
- Amano Motonobu
- Petro Kasui Kibe (1587–1639)
- Itō Mancio (伊東マンショ Itō Mansho), 伊東祐益 (1570–1612)
- Julião Nakaura (中浦ジュリアン Nakaura Jurian)
- Martinão Hara (原マルチノ Hara Maruchino)
- Miguel Chijiwa (千々石ミゲル Chijiwa Migeru)
- Akashi Takenori
- Leonardo Kimura (1575-1619)
- Hasekura Tsunenaga (支倉常長)
- Murayama Tōan "Antonio" (村山等安) (d.1619)
- Naitō Joan
- Gohime "Monica" (Bizen no Gomoji), Hideyoshi's daughter (1574–1634)
- Hosokawa Gracia
- Kyōgoku Maria
- Amakusa Shirō
- Julia Ota (Korean; later exiled in Japan)
- Naitō Julia

== See also ==
- Folk Catholicism
- Japanese words of Portuguese origin
- List of Westerners who visited Japan before 1868
- Martyrs of Japan
- Nanban trade period
- Nippo Jisho
- Roman Catholicism in Japan
- Suwa Shrine (Nagasaki)

== General and cited references ==
- Brett, L. Walker (Fall 2002). "Foreign Affairs and Frontiers in Early Modern Japan: a Historio-graphical Essay". Early Modern Japan. 10 (2): 44–62.
- Cooper, Michael (1974). Rodrigues the Interpreter – An Early Jesuit in Japan and China. New York: Weatherhill. ISBN 978-0-8348-0319-0.
- Costa, João Paulo Oliveira (2003). "The misericordias among Japanese Christian communities in the 16th and 17th centuries". Bulletin of Portuguese/Japanese Studies. 5: 67–79.
- Elison, George (1973). Deus Destroyed: The Image of Christianity in Early Modern Japan. Cambridge, MA: Council of East Asian Studies, Harvard University; Harvard University Press. ISBN 978-0-674-19962-0.
- Herbermann, Charles, ed. (1913). "Japan" . Catholic Encyclopedia. New York: Robert Appleton Company.
- Herbermann, Charles, ed. (1913). "St. Francis Xavier" . Catholic Encyclopedia. New York: Robert Appleton Company.
- Higashibaba, Ikuo (2001). Christianity in Early Modern Japan: Kirishitan Belief and Practice. Brill. ISBN 978-90-04-12290-1.
- 五重塔 (in Japanese). Hōryū-ji. Archived from the original on 2010-01-11.
- "Kondō" (in Japanese). Hōryū-ji. Archived from the original on 2010-01-11.
- Jansen, Marius (2000). The Making of Modern Japan. Harvard University Press. ISBN 9780674003347.
- "Nestorian Christianity in the Tang Dynasty". The Keikyo Institute. Archived from the original on 2021-12-10.
- Kiernan, Ben (2007). Blood and Soil. Yale Univ Press. pp. 125–6. ISBN 978-0-300-10098-3.
- Lopez-Gay (2003). "St Francis Xavier and the Shimazu Family". Bulletin of Portuguese/Japanese Studies. Portugal: Uni. Nova de Lisboa.
- Miyazaki, Kentaro (2001). Kakure Kirishitan – Orasho, Figured Bass of Their Souls (in Japanese). Nagasaki Shimbun Shinsho. ISBN 978-4-931493-40-7.
- Mullins, Mark R (1990). "Japanese Pentecostalism and the World of the Dead: a Study of Cultural Adaptation in Iesu no Mitama Kyokai". Japanese Journal of Religious Studies. 17 (4): 353–74. doi:10.18874/jjrs.17.4.1990.353-374.
- Nosco, Peter (1993). "Secrecy and the Transmission of Tradition, Issues in the Study of the 'Underground Christians'". Japanese Journal of Religious Studies. 20 (1): 3–30. doi:10.18874/jjrs.20.1.1993.3-29.
- Ruiz de Medina, Father Juan Garcia (1995) [1990]. Documentos del Japón [Documents from Japan]. Rome: Instituto Histórico de la Compañía de Jesús.
- Ruiz de Medina, Father Juan Garcia (1993). Cultural Interactions in the Orient 30 years before Matteo Ricci. Catholic Uni. of Portugal.
- Shimizu, Hirokazu (1977). Kirishitan Kankei Hosei Shiryo Shu.
- Toshihiko, Abe (1998). Japan's Hidden Face. Bainbridgebooks/Trans-Atlantic Publications. ISBN 978-1-891696-05-3.
