= Konishi Yukikage =

Japanese samurai

- 小西行景
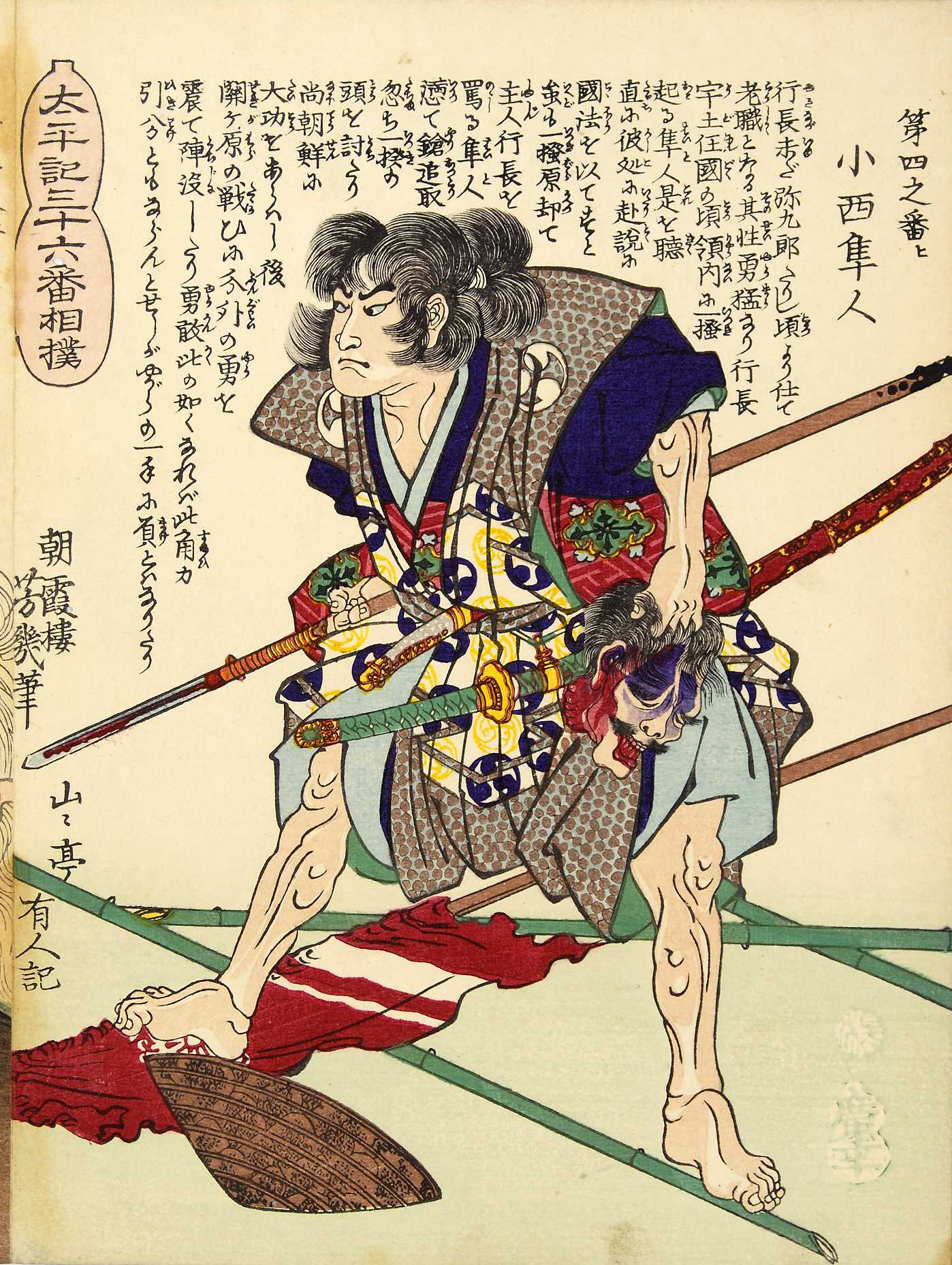
- Born: 1561
- Died: 1600 (aged 38–39)
- Burial place: Zenjoji Temple ( Chuo Ward, Kumamoto City, Kumamoto Prefecture )
- Other names: Konishi Hayato, Konishi Nagamoto,
- Relatives: Konishi Yukinaga (brother)
- Military career
- Allegiance: Konishi clan
- Rank: Castellan
- Conflicts: Korean campaign Siege of Udo

Konishi Yukikage (小西 行景; 1561 - 1600), also known as Konishi Hayato, was a Japanese samurai of the late Sengoku period. He was the younger brother of the Christian daimyo, Konishi Yukinaga.

He fought bravely against Kato Kiyomasa in the Siege of Udo, killing Kato's senior retainer. After he found out the western army had been defeated, he decided to surrender. He committed seppuku in exchange for assurances that all his vassals would be spared and hired with the same salary.

Yukikage was buried in Zenjoji Temple, Kumamoto, by Nanjo Motokiyo. His grave is marked with a small uninscribed stone surrounded by the gravestones of Konishi vassals as if they are protecting it. It is said that Konishi Yukinaga's remains had been moved from Kyoto to be buried with his brother.
