= Japanese Left Army =

Military command of the Japanese invasions of Korea

During the Japanese invasions of Korea (1592–1598), the Japanese Left Army was a Japanese army. Under the command of Ukita Hideie in the late 16th century, it consisted mainly of the former First division led by Konishi Yukinaga, the Fourth Division led by Shimazu Yoshihiro, and the Eighth Division led by Ukita Hideie.

== Organization ==
The following was the organization of the army as of September 1597:

- Konishi Yukinaga (小西行長) — 7,000 men
- So Yoshitoshi (宗義智) — 1,000 men
- Matsura Shigenobu (松浦鎮信) — 3,000 men
- Arima Harunobu (有馬晴信) — 2,000 men
- Omura Yoshiaki (大村喜前) — 1,000 men
- Goto Sumiharu (五島純玄) — 700 men
- Hachisuka Iemasa (蜂須賀家政) — 7,200 men
- Mōri Yoshinari (毛利吉成) — 2,000 men
- Ikoma Kazumasa (生駒一正) — 2,700 men
- Shimazu Yoshihiro (島津義弘) — 10,000 men
- Shimazu Tadatoyo (島津忠豊) — 800 men
- Akizuki Tanenaga (秋月種長) — 300 men
- Takahashi Mototane (高橋元種) — 600 men
- Ito Yuhei — 500 men
- Sagara Yorifusa (相良頼房) — 800 men
- Ukita Hideie (宇喜多秀家) — 10,000 men
- Ota Kazuyoshi (太田一吉) —
- Takenaka Shigetoshi (竹中重利) —

== Battles fought ==
- Battle of Chilcheollyang (칠천량)
- The Siege of Namwon (남원성)
- Battle of Geumgu (금구)
- Battle of Myeongnyang (명량)
- Battle of Gwangyang (광양)
- Battle of Muju (무주성)
- Battle of Hamyang (함양)
- Battle of Sacheon (1598) (사천)
- Siege of Suncheon (순천)
- Battle of Noryang Point (노량)

== See also ==
- Japanese Right Army
- Japanese invasions of Korea (1592–1598)
