= Japanese Right Army =

Military command of the Japanese invasions of Korea

The Japanese Right Army or Army of the Right was an army of Japan during the second wave of Japanese invasions of Korea, in the years 1597–1598. It included forces from several divisions of the earlier invasions (1592–1596). Under the overall command of Mori Hidemoto, the Right Army consisted mainly of the former Second Division led by Katō Kiyomasa, the Third Division led by Kuroda Nagamasa and the Seventh Division led by Mōri Hidemoto, who replaced his cousin Mōri Terumoto.

== Organization ==
The following was the organization of the Right Army as of September 1597:

- Katō Kiyomasa (加藤清正) – 10,000 men
- Kuroda Nagamasa (黒田長政) – 5,000 men
- Nabeshima Naoshige (鍋島直茂) & Katsushige – 12,000 men
- Ikeda Hideshi – 2,800 men
- Nakagawa Hidenari – 2,500 men
- Chosokabe Motochika – 3,000 men
- Mōri Hidemoto (毛利秀元) – 30,000 men

The total count (as of September 1597) was 65,300 men.

== Battles fought ==
- The Battle of Koryong (고령)
- The Siege of Hwangsoksan (황석산성)
- The Battle of Jiksan (직산)
- The First Siege of Ulsan (울산)
- The Siege of Samga (삼가성)
- The Second Siege of Ulsan (울산)

== See also ==
- Japanese Left Army
