= Kim Seong-han (novelist) =

South Korean novelist (1919–2010)

- Born: January 17, 1919; Pungsan, South Hamgyong Province, Korea, Empire of Japan
- Died: September 6, 2010 (aged 91); Seoul, South Korea
- Occupation: Novelist
- Writing career
- Language: Korean

Korean name
- Hangul: 김성한
- Hanja: 金聲翰
- RR: Gim Seonghan
- MR: Kim Sŏnghan

Art name
- Hangul: 하남
- Hanja: 霞南
- RR: Hanam
- MR: Hanam

Kim Seong-han (Korean: 김성한; January 17, 1919 – September 6, 2010) was a South Korean novelist.

== Awards ==
- 1956: Dong-in Literary Award
- 1989: Inchon Award
