= Konishi Yukinaga =

Japanese daimyō (1558–1600)

- 小西 行長
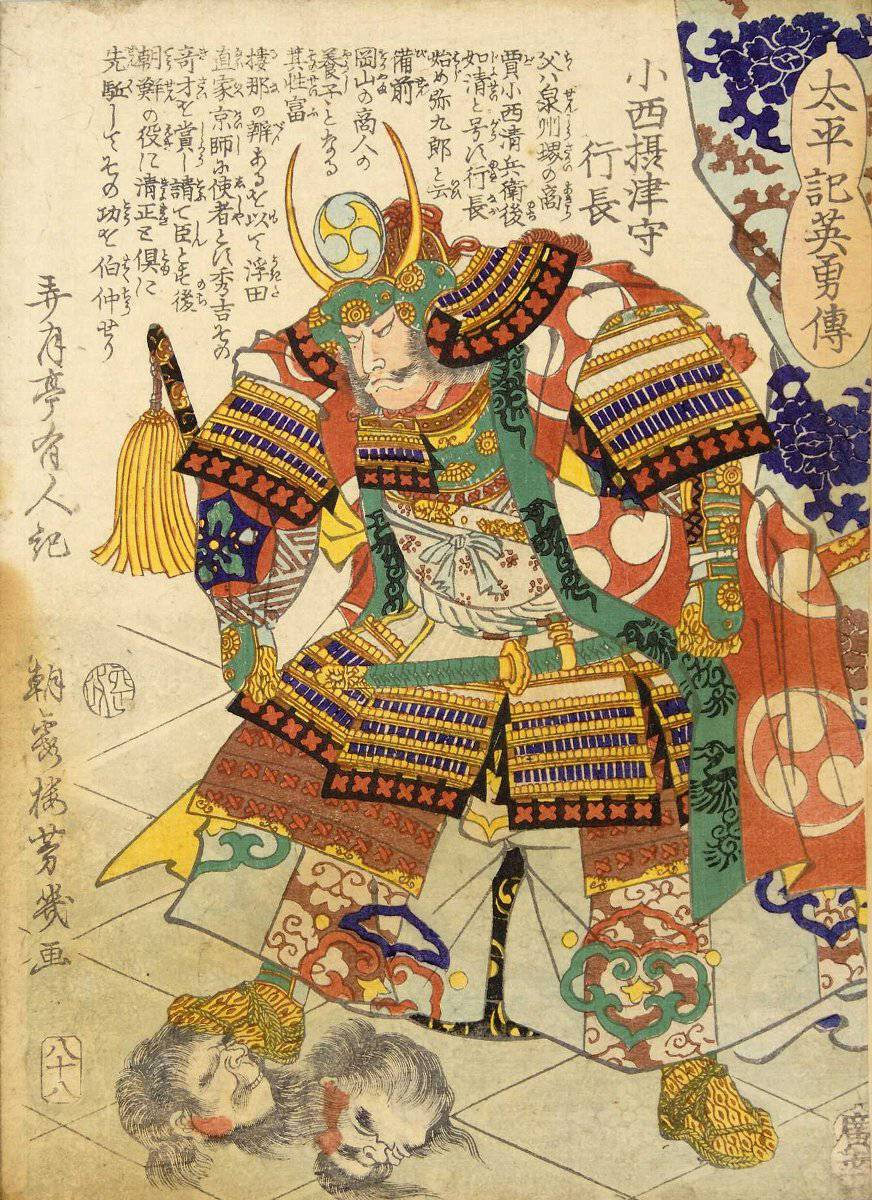

Daimyō of Southern Higo
- In office 1588–1600
- Preceded by: Sassa Narimasa
- Succeeded by: Kato Kiyomasa

Personal details
- Born: Yakuro (弥九郎); 1558 Kyoto
- Died: November 6, 1600 (aged 41–42) Kyoto
- Spouse: Justa
- Children: Julia Ota
- Parents: Konishi Ryusa (father); Wakusa (mother)
- Relatives: Konishi Yukikage (brother)

Military service
- Allegiance: Ukita clan Toyotomi clan Western Army
- Rank: Daimyō
- Commands: Udo Castle
- Battles/wars: Siege of Takamatsu; Siege of Ōta Castle; Invasion of Shikoku; Kyushu Campaign; Korean campaign Battle of Sekigahara (executed)

Konishi Yukinaga (小西 行長; 1558 – November 6, 1600; baptized under the Portuguese personal name Agostinho) was a Japanese daimyō who served under Toyotomi Hideyoshi. Known as a Kirishitan daimyo, he is notable for his role as the vanguard of the Japanese invasion of Korea.

== Early life ==
Konishi Yukinaga was the second son of a wealthy Sakai merchant, Konishi Ryūsa. Ryūsa's wife was also baptised under the name of Magdalena. He was later adopted by an Okayama merchant called Totoya Kuroemon. It was unclear when he started to become a samurai. However, he caught the attention of the Okayama daimyo, Ukita Naoie.

There is a theory that his adoption by Okayama merchant was not a coincidence, but was set up by his father, Ryusa. Ryusa had been already in contact with the Oda clan which planned to take over Chūgoku region. The Ukita clan would be the key player in Oda's Chugoku campaign against the Mōri clan, which would be led by Toyotomi Hideyoshi. However, the Ukita was by then the ally of the Mōri. Yukinaga, who had a connection with the Oda, served as the liaison between the Ukita clan and the Toyotomi clan, facilitating the Ukita's surrender. Without the help of the Ukita clan, Toyotomi Hideyoshi might be in a big trouble. Hideyoshi valued this help greatly since he considered this period to be the greatest crisis in his life.

The defection of Ukita Naoie allowed the Oda to have a smooth run in Chūgoku region. They could easily quell Araki Murashige's rebellion because the Ukita was preventing the Mōri from helping Araki. Araki Murashige would later get back at the Konishi father and son by accusing them of false crime. They were temporarily confined but managed to prove their innocence in the end.

== Service under Hideyoshi ==
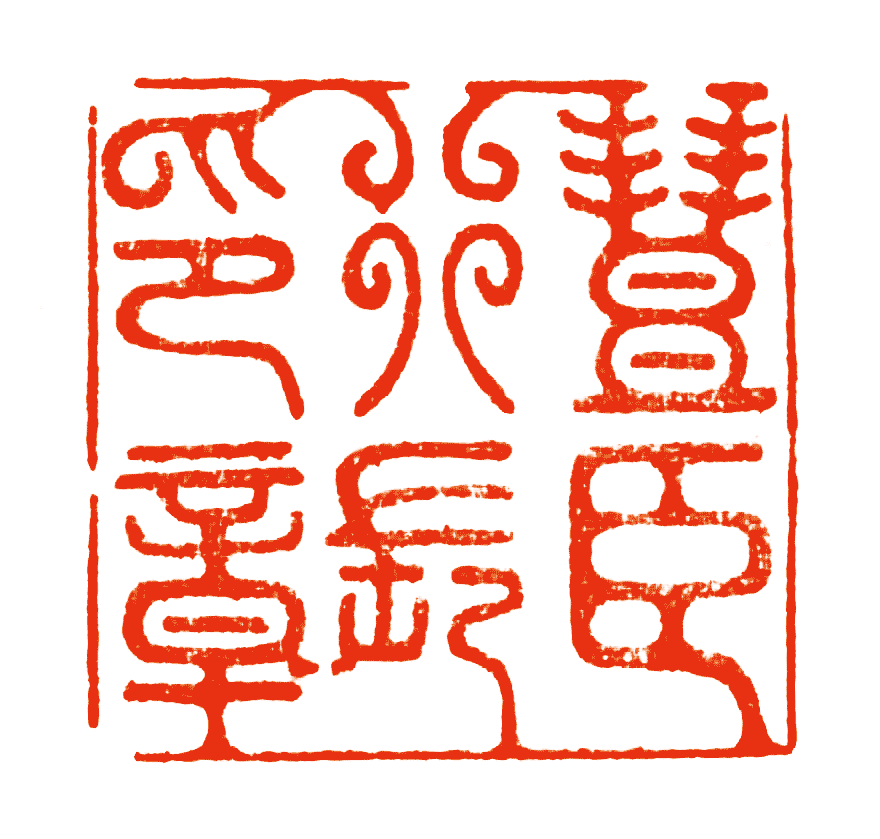
Toyotomi Yukinaga's seal

Due to Toyotomi Hideyoshi's lowly background, he didn't have hereditary vassals. Many samurai also refused to serve under him. For this reason, Ryusa had his entire family serve Hideyoshi. Even Yukinaga's mother, Magdalena Wakusa, served Hideyoshi's wife as a senior lady in waiting. Yukinaga, himself, served as Hideyoshi's commander of the sea. Because very few Oda's vassals understood naval transportation and battle, his career advanced rapidly. He brought his fleets to join the flood attack during Siege of Takamatsu and Siege of Ōta Castle. He also commanded a navy during Invasion of Shikoku and Invasion of Kyushu. For his service, he was given the right to use the Toyotomi surname. After he quelled the local uprising in Higo Province, he was awarded a 250.000 koku fief in the southern half of that province.

Yukinaga was against invading other countries, but he participated in a delegation to the Spanish Philippines to offer help in a possible joint invasion of China, and later ended up leading the initial forces under Toyotomi Hideyoshi to invade Korea in the Seven-Year War. Feeling conquering China was impossible, Yukinaga ran a blitzkrieg in Korea to capture the king of Joseon and end the war through diplomacy before the Ming military came. He beat Kato Kiyomasa in the race to Seoul. However, when he arrived at the capital, the king had fled, so the chase continued to Pyongyang.

During his stay in Pyongyang, the Japanese army suffered from a logistics crisis. He sent his brother, Yoshichiro, to persuade Hideyoshi to abandon the Ming conquest and settled with 5 provinces of Joseon through diplomacy. Hideyoshi approved and told the other generals to watch over Yukinaga in Pyongyang.

However, Yukinaga got scammed by his negotiation partner, Shen Weijing (沈惟敬), who demanded 50 days truce. Shen said he would go back to Beijing to get the emperor to approve Yukinaga's request. In reality, he was buying time for the Ming military to settle Ningxia rebellion. To make it worse, the Chinese caught a Korean defector, who was a part of Yukinaga's intelligent network, and tortured him until he confessed. The network was exposed and destroyed. As the result, Yukinaga only knew the Ming military had entered Joseon a few days before the Siege of Pyongyang. In the end, Pyongyang fell and Yukinaga withdrew to Seoul.

Not long after, due to a logistics crisis on both sides, Ming dynasty and Japan agreed to negotiate with Yukinaga leading the negotiation process. Hideyoshi issued 7 demands, which were later softened to 3 demands (4 provinces of Joseon, a Korean prince as a hostage, and tributary trade with Ming). The objective of the negotiation was to put Japan above Korea within the Tributary system of China. However, the Chinese side failed to settle this issue because they thought they were winning. After all, it was Japan who demanded peace, the Ming side saw no reason why they should grant Hideyoshi's demand.

When he found out Ming dynasty ignored the 3 demands and was only willing to grant Hideyoshi an investiture, Yukinaga, who was unwilling to give up the peace treaties, made Hideyoshi go through the investiture ceremony without him knowing that his 3 demands were not granted by the emperor.

After the ceremony, Hideyoshi was in a good mood and sent some messengers to the Chinese envoys, telling them to ask anything they wanted. The Chinese asked when would Japan return the occupied Joseon territory. When Hideyoshi heard that, he was angry. Hideyoshi used the fact that the Korean side did not send a prince as a hostage as an excuse to break truce.

The failure almost led Yukinaga to commit seppuku. However, Mashita Nagamori persuaded him not to do so. He soon recovered and again tried to persuade Korea to send a prince to prevent the war from being restarted.

To win the trust of his opponents, he leaked military secrets to the Korean side through general Kim Ung-seo. He told the Korean side of Japan's mobilization plan. Kim Ung-seo partially believed this, but missed the most important part which was to harvest the field as to leave the Japanese army with no food and relocate civilians to remote areas.

He also told the Korean side Katō Kiyomasa's landing spot, asking the Korean navy to attack Kiyomasa. However, Admiral Yi Sun-sin thought this was a trap. As the result, the Korean king had Yi Sun-sin imprisoned and tortured. The Japanese used this opportunity to destroy most of the Korean ships in the Battle of Chilcheollyang.

The war started again. Yukinaga acted as the vanguard of the Japanese Left Army during the Siege of Namwon. He defended Suncheon Castle, and repelled Ming (China) and Joseon allied forces.

== Sekigahara Campaign ==
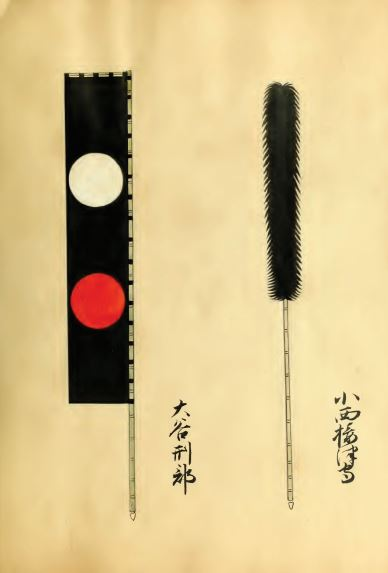
Konishi Yukinaga Battle Standard

After Hideyoshi's death, Yukinaga returned to Japan. During the 7 years war, he had developed a deep friendship with Ishida Mitsunari, who also wanted to stop Hideyoshi's foreign invasion. The Jesuits wrote that Mitsunari was Yukinaga's special friend. In his own letter, Mitsunari also mentioned he was particularly close to Yukinaga.

Yukinaga defended Mitsunari during his dispute with 7 generals. When Mitsunari was put under house arrest, Yukinaga wanted to accompany him, but Mitsunari refused. Tokugawa Ieyasu was impressed by the devotion he showed to Mitsunari and openly praised him, "He risked his life and all his property to help his friend". After that, Ieyasu worked hard to win Yukinaga's friendship. He even suggested that Yukinaga's heir marry his granddaughter. Yukinaga was hesitant. He said he was willing to marry his son to Ieyasu's granddaughter if Ieyasu stopped undermining Hideyori's authority.

Later on, Yukinaga worked under Ieyasu to restore the diplomatic relations with Korea. During this period, he learned that Ieyasu was afraid of foreign power and would even sacrifice foreign trades if necessary. Without foreign trade, Christianity would be banned also. There was no place for Yukinaga in Tokugawa government. This reason made him determined to fight against Ieyasu.

He brought 2000 troops to join Ishida Mitsunari's side during the Battle of Sekigahara and left the rest of his troops in Uto. The number was small compared to the number he led in Korea. Being the vanguard of the Korean campaign had significantly damaged his military strength. Mitsunari and Ukita Hideie added at least 2000 more to that number.

Yukinaga fought bravely but was ultimately defeated due to the betrayal of various daimyo.

== Death ==
He fled to Mount Ibuki, but knowing he could not escape, he told a farmer to sell him to Tokugawa. The farmer refused and recommended he commit seppuku. Yukinaga said he would not commit seppuku because he was a Christian. The farmer informed Takenaka Shigekado to escort him to the Eastern Army camp.

Kuroda Nagamasa wanted to plead an amnesty for him, but Yukinaga said there was no need for that. He only asked to meet a priest for his last confession. However, it was not granted by Ieyasu.

He was beheaded together with Ishida Mitsunari and Ankokuji Ekei.

== Evaluation ==
Yukinaga is not properly evaluated in Japan. In Japanese pop culture, he is often portrayed as a weak bureaucrat similar to Ishida Mitsunari. However, this image does not hold when crosschecked with Chinese, Korean or European historical materials. This is because, unlike other military commanders, his descendants could not produce military myths to boast about his achievements due to his defeat at Sekigahara and him being a member of a once forbidden religion.

While his loss in Pyongyang is often cited as an example of his military incompetence, Hideyoshi did not blame him for this loss. Konishi's forces were outnumbered and out-armed, so the result was generally to be expected. The Japanese had no clue at the time as to how to defend a walled city like Pyongyang, as such an urban layout did not exist in Japan. Later on in the war in Korea, the Japanese forces built their own fortresses instead of relying on captured Korean fortifications.

As the only Japanese commander who faced the main Ming army alone (and without the protection of Japanese castles), Chinese generals held him in high regard, as it was not easy to retreat without being routed after being defeated by a clearly superior force. The Ming general Yang Yuan later begrudgingly praised him for being highly talented. When the Ming army attacked Kato Kiyomasa in Ulsan, arrangements were made to ensure that Yukinaga would not reinforce Kiyomasa's positions (though given the grudge between the two commanders this was unlikely) even though his forces were not as close to Ulsan as those of other Japanese commanders, suggesting that the Ming considered him to be a substantial threat.

Yukinaga was also praised by Oda Nobunaga for defending the Oda territory in Seto Inland Sea from the Mori navy, which was noticeably unusual as Nobunaga normally did not pay attention to Hideyoshi's protegés.

== Appearance ==
No contemporary portraits of Konishi survive. However, Jesuits' reports described him as tall and pale, unlike ordinary people.

The Veritable Records of King Seonjo described him as dignified, someone who should not be taken lightly.

== Popular culture ==
Yukinaga is one of the few samurai who have more appearances in Korean pop culture than in Japanese pop culture. He often appeared as a major villain in Korean dramas. He was treated more sympathetically in novels. The Korean novel 7 nyeon jeonjaeng, by Kim Seong-han, portrayed him as a tragic anti-hero who tried to stop Hideyoshi's invasion of Korea to no avail.

Award-winning Japanese novelist Shūsaku Endō portrayed him as being jealous of Takayama Ukon, who was able to gracefully abandon everything and devote his entire life to God. Yukinaga was described as a "weak man" who suffered an inferiority complex from being unable to abandon the muddy world and live a clean life as a Christian. Endo's Yukinaga was, in fact, a person who endured a heavy cross without abandoning it even if he had to crawl on the dirt and he did it without expecting anything in return.

=== Television ===
- Portrayed by Jung Sung-ho in the 2004-2005 KBS1 TV series Immortal Admiral Yi Sun-sin.
- Portrayed by Lee Kwang-Ki in the 2015 KBS1 TV series Jingbirok.
- Portrayed by Park Dong-Ha in the 2016 KBS1 TV series Imjin War 1592

=== Books ===
- Tetsu no Kubikase by Shūsaku Endō (1977).
- Shukuteki by Shūsaku Endō (1985).
- 7 nyeon jeonjaeng by Kim Seong-han (1985).

=== Games ===
- Appears as a character in the video game Pokémon Conquest. His partner Pokémon is Audino.
- Appears as a character in the video game Saihai no Yukue.
