= Ecclesiastical Nagasaki =

Nagasaki between 1580 and 1587

Ecclesiastical Nagasaki Nagasáqui (Portuguese) 長崎 (Japanese)
- 1580–1587
- Status: Settlement under Jesuit administration
- Capital: Nagasaki City
- Common languages: Portuguese, Japanese, Japanese-Portuguese pidgin
- Religion: Roman Catholicism
- Visitor of Missions in the Indies
  - 1573-1606: Alessandro Valignano
- Superior of the Japan mission
  - 1581–1590: Gaspar Coelho
- Historical era: Imperialism
  - Donation of Bartolomeu: 15 August 1580
  - Annexation of Nagasaki by Toyotomi Hideyoshi: 14 January 1587
Preceded by	Succeeded by
Japan; Ōmura clan	Japan; Shimazu clan

Ecclesiastical Nagasaki refers to the period during which the city of Nagasaki was administered by the Jesuits under the nominal authority of the Ōmura clan.

Contrary to some accounts, it was not a Portuguese colony. Portuguese representatives had only commercial and religious privileges under the Padroado.

== First contacts with the Portuguese ==
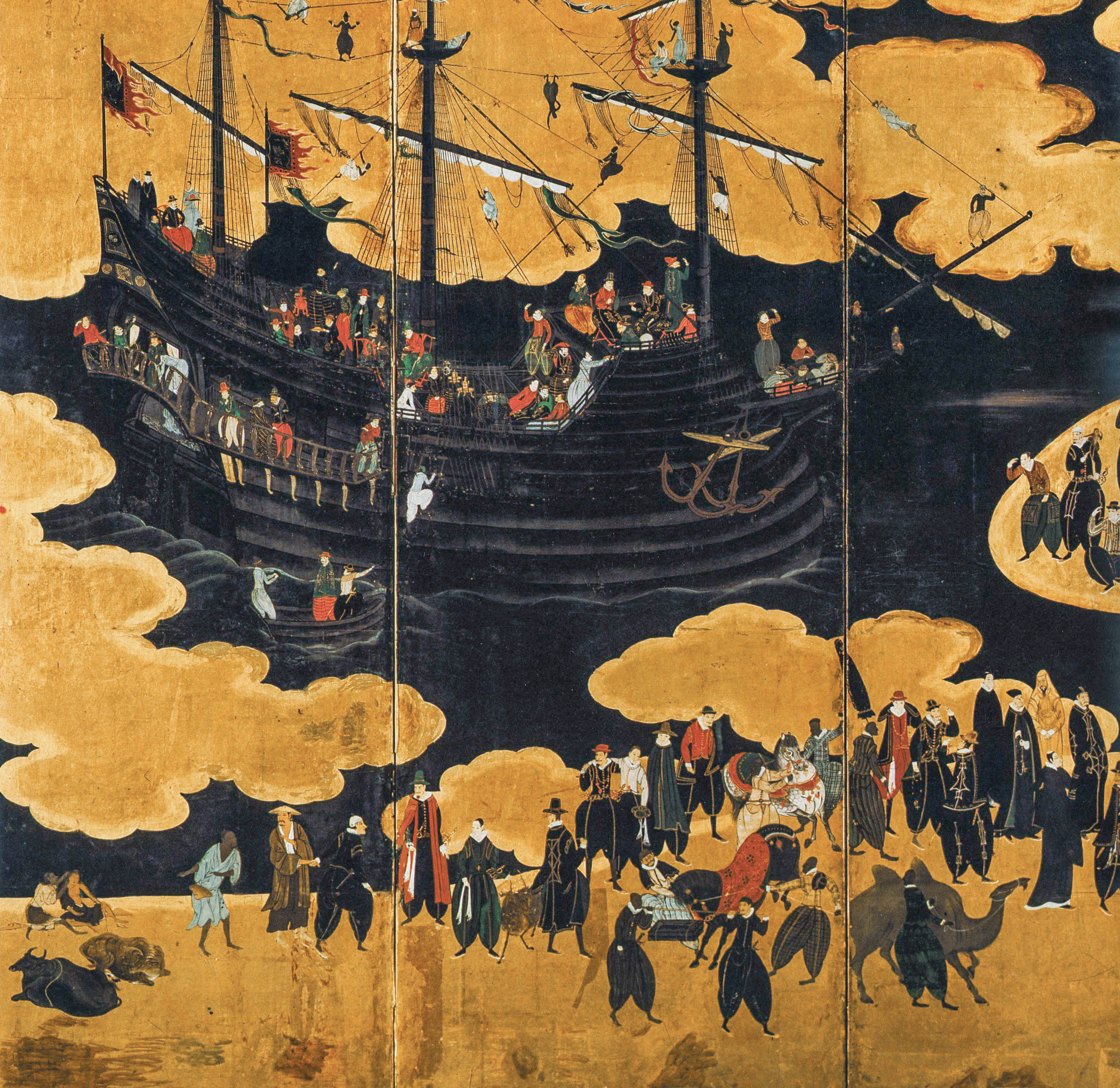
Kanō Naizen (1570–1616): Arrival of the Southern Barbarians (Nanban-jin) Screen (detail), between 1588 and 1616. "Namban" art ("barbarians from the South") attributed to Naizen. This is only the left 3 panels of 6 panels. Screen depicting the unloading of the black ship. The Portuguese carrack is depicted in great detail.

The first Portuguese (and incidentally, Western) landfall on Japanese soil appears to have been in 1543, after a group of Portuguese merchants travelling aboard a trade junk towards China were blown off course to the island of Tanegashima.

Thereafter, trade began between Portuguese Malacca, China, and Japan, as the Portuguese took advantage of the Chinese trade embargo on Japan to act as middlemen between the two nations. In 1550, King John III of Portugal declared the Japanese trade a "crown monopoly", and henceforth, only ships authorized by Goa were allowed to make the journey. In 1557 the authorities of Canton (Guangzhou) leased Macau to the Portuguese to support this trade, in exchange for tribute in silver.

The state of civil war in Japan was highly beneficial to the Portuguese, as several competing lords sought to attract the Portuguese "black ship" and its trade to their domains. Initially the Portuguese called either at Firando (Hirado) belonging to Matsura Takanobu, or Bungo belonging to Ōtomo Sōrin, but in 1562 shifted to Yokoseura when its lord, Omura Sumitada, offered to be the first lord to convert to Christianity, adopting the name Dom Bartolomeu. In 1564 he faced a rebellion instigated by Buddhist priests and Yokoseura was razed to the ground.

In 1571, Dom Bartolomeu, or Omura Sumitada, granted some land in the small fishing village of Nagasaki to the Jesuits, that was divided into six neighborhoods, to receive exiled Christians from other territories and the Portuguese traders. The Jesuits constructed a chapel and a college under the name of St. Paul, like those of Goa and Malacca. By 1579 Nagasaki had 400 homes, with a few Portuguese casados (married men).

=== Lease ===
Fearful that Nagasaki might fall to his rival Takanobu, Omura Sumitada, or Dom Bartolomeu, decided to grant the city directly to the Jesuits in 1580.

As appointed "Visitor of Missions in the Indies", Alessandro Valignano was responsible for concluding with Sumitada the terms of the lease, including all the legal details, being himself a jurist. The Jesuits would be responsible for electing a regedor to administer the city and pledge allegiance to Sumitada, who was still nominally considered the lord of the territory. By this bilateral agreement, Nagasaki was in a very similar situation as Macau, where the Portuguese had agreed to pay the authorities of Canton a fee in exchange for special privileges over the territory.

== The city ==
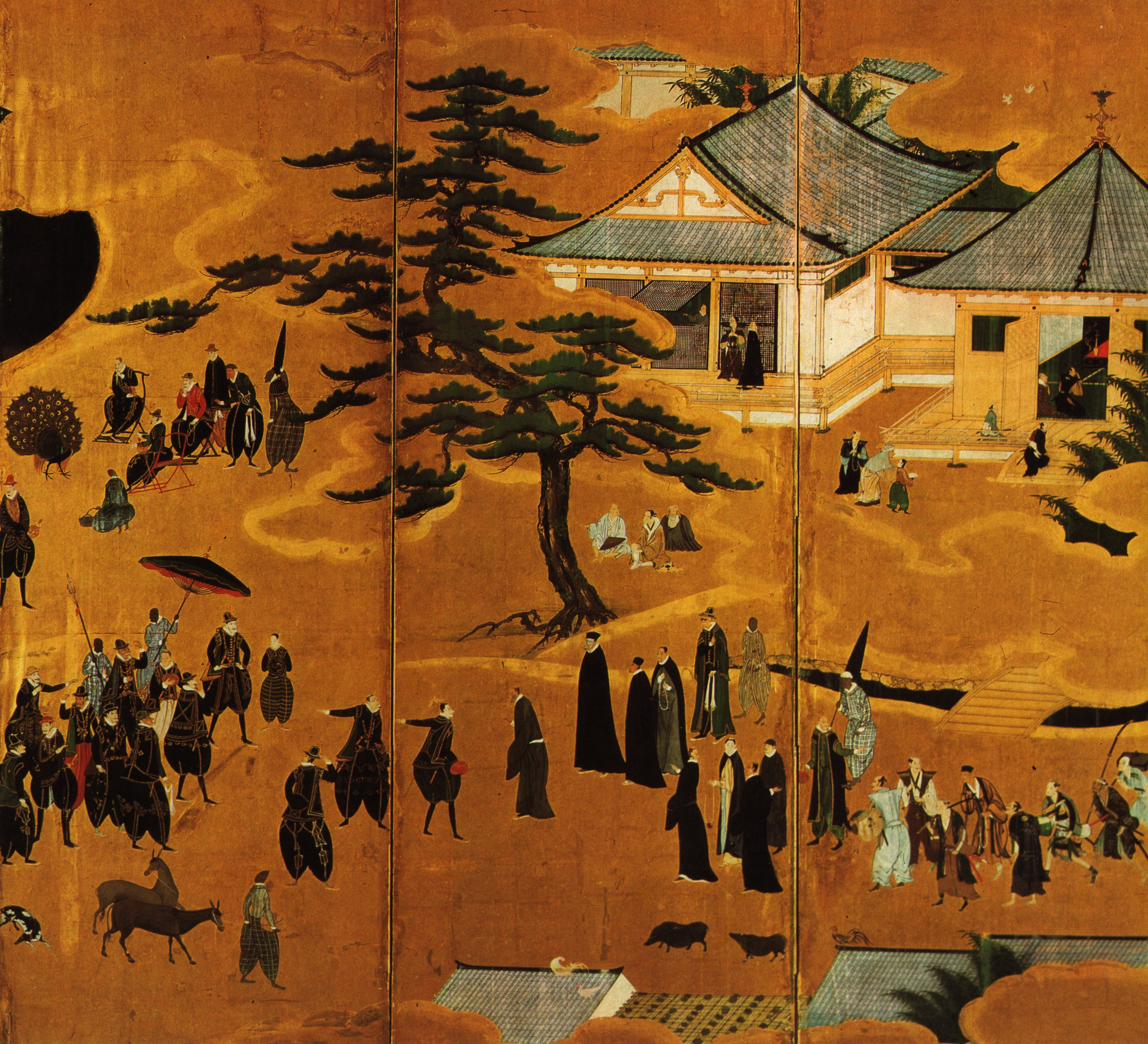
The unloading of the black ship, right side of the screen shown above

Unlike many Asian cities built on a grid inspired by the Chinese model, Nagasaki was built around a centre where the most important buildings were located, namely the church, the charity (the Misericórdia) and the town hall, though it did not have any fortifications.

Between 1603 and 1613 Nagasaki would also have a painting school, guided by the Italian Giovanni Niccolò.

Nagasaki had a "Civil Code" and "Criminal Code", distinct from Japanese law - which was adapted to Roman law; corporal punishments were lessened. The city was described as having "an unusual number of children" as its Christian inhabitants avoided infanticide, otherwise common in Japanese society. The houses were painted white, as in Portuguese fashion. The city had 5000 inhabitants by 1590, and 15,000 in 1600.

The "black ship" or ships, known to the Portuguese as the nau do trato ("the trade ship"), arrived from Goa once every year, between August and September and left as soon as the winds shifted, usually in November or afterwards, in February or March – a journey that could take as many as 2 years or more to complete, because of the different monsoon patterns throughout east and southeast Asia.

== End of the grant ==
In 1586, the lands of the Omura clan were overrun by forces of Shimazu Yoshihisa, greatly threatening the city. At the request of Otomo Sorin of Bungo, Toyotomi Hideyoshi intervened, and so Shimazu Yoshihisa was defeated the following year. Hideyoshi however, took the chance to announce the first anti-Christian edict, and ordered that Nagasaki be returned to Omura clan control, thus putting an end to foreign control of the city. Nevertheless, it remained the main port of call for the Portuguese ships in the decades that followed.

== See also ==
- Nanban trade
- Arte da Lingoa de Iapam
- Battle of Fukuda Bay
- António Mota
- Francisco Zeimoto
- Fernão Mendes Pinto

== Bibliography ==
- João Paulo Oliveira e Costa (1993) Portugal and Japan - The Namban Century Lisbon, Imprensa Nacional Casa da Moeda.
- Luís Fróis (1549-1593) História do Japão Lisbon, Biblioteca Nacional de Lisboa, 1976 edition.
- Charles Ralph Boxer (1959): The Great Ship From Amacon: Annals of Macao and the Old Japan Trade, 1555-1640.
- Charles Ralph Boxer (1951): The Christian Century in Japan 1549-1650 University of California Press.
