= Japanese–Portuguese conflicts =

Military engagements in the 16th, 17th, and 20th centuries

- Part of Portuguese presence in Asia
Location	Japan, Macau, Timor.

Belligerents
16th century: Kingdom of Portugal; 17th century: Kingdom of Portugal; 20th century: Republic of Portugal	16th century: Mōri clan Matsura clan 17th century: Tokugawa shogunate; Arima clan; 20th century: Empire of Japan

Commanders and leaders
João Pereira; André Pessoa † (Portugal) Manuel de Abreu Ferreira de Carvalho (Portugal) Lieutenant Manuel de Jesus Pires (POW) (Portugal) Dom Aleixo Corte-Real (executed)	Murakami Takeyoshi; Matsura Takanobu; Arima Harunobu (Empire of Japan) Sadashichi Doi (Empire of Japan) Yuitsu Tsuchihashi

Japanese–Portuguese conflicts refers to the military engagements between Portuguese and Japanese forces, that took place in Japan, Macau and Timor, in the 16th, 17th, and 20th centuries.

== Background ==
In 1541, 1542 or 1543 (sources differ) Portugal established contact with Japan. Japan was then involved in a long civil-war but since Ming China had officially cut relations with Japan meant that Portuguese merchants could serve as a profitable commercial intermediary between the two nations. In 1550, the Portuguese Crown created an official trade route linking Goa, capital of its holdings in Asia, and Japan, and every year one or a number of large tradeships would sail to Japan and back, commanded by a captain-major. The Portuguese found enthusiastic commercial and diplomatical partners among Japanese lords and some, like Ōtomo Sōrin and Ōmura Sumitada converted to Christianity. Instability in Japan, or other reasons, meant that the Portuguese would occasionally be drawn into internal Japanese conflicts.

== 16th–17th centuries ==
=== Siege of Moji, 1561 ===
In 1561, 15 Portuguese were killed in a brawl with the Japanese in Hirado while a captain was also killed in Akune, the earliest recorded clashes between Europeans and the Japanese. That same year, Ōtomo Sōrin requested Portuguese aid to recapture the castle of Moji, then held by forces of the Mori clan. The Portuguese provided three ships between 500 and 600, each with a crew of about 300 men and 17 to 18 cannon. In what was the first naval bombardment on Japan, the Portuguese ships opened fire on the castle of Moji, allowing Otomo forces to establish themselves around it. After expending their ammunition the Portuguese withdrew.

=== Battle of Fukuda Bay, 1565 ===
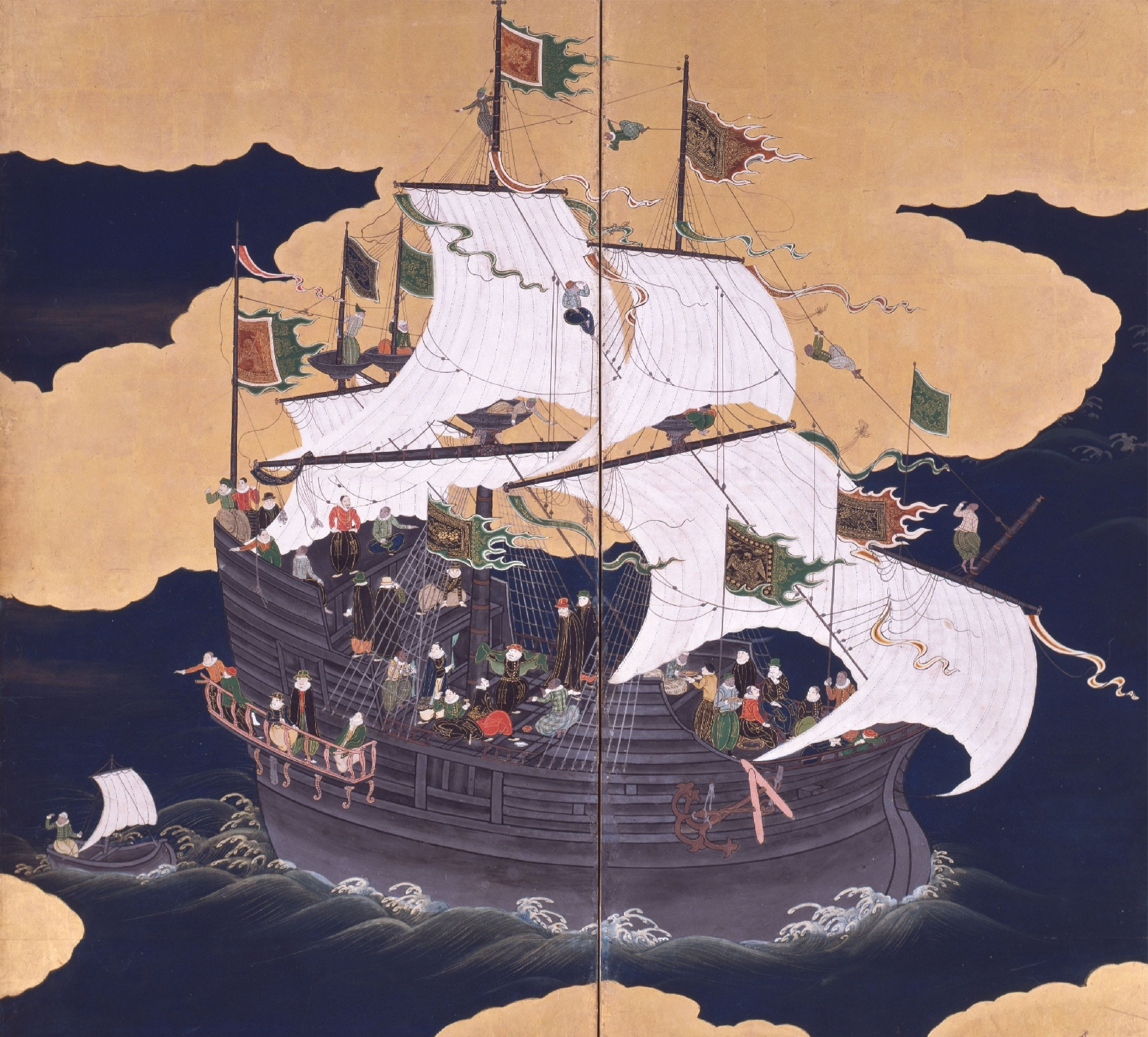
Portuguese carrack depicted in a Japanese screen.

Early in 18 October 1565, the lord of Hirado Matsura Takanobu attacked two Portuguese ships anchored at Fukuda, with a flotilla of eight to ten large junks, up to sixty smaller boats and several hundred samurai, when most Portuguese were ashore. The Japanese were repulsed however, having lost 3 ships and 70 men. The Portuguese suffered only 8 lives lost, and set sail for Macao at the end of November.

=== Red Seal Ship incident, 1608 or 1609 ===
In 1608, a Japanese red seal ship anchored in Macau after returning from Cambodia. The crew consisted of 30-40 men and they displayed rowdy behavior as they roamed the town. Their actions alarmed the Chinese inhabitants, who urged the Senate of Macau to take measures against the Japanese. Initially, the Senate advised the Japanese crewmen to moderate their behavior and to disguise themselves as Chinese, but that was ignored. The Portuguese then decided to take a firmer stance and it resulted in a serious brawl. Alarmed by this situation, Captain-Major André Pessoa responded with armed reinforcements forcing the Japanese to surrender. This incident sparked outrage among the Japanese and the relations between them and Portugal became increasingly strained.

=== Nossa Senhora da Graça Incident, 1610 ===
After the death of about 50 Japanese of the Arima clan in a brawl in Macau, a Portuguese great carrack was attacked in near Nagasaki by a fleet of over 33 vessels carrying around 3000 samurai belonging to the Arima clan in a four-day naval battle. The richly laden "great ship of commerce", famed as the "black ship" by the Japanese, sank after its captain André Pessoa set the gunpowder storage on fire as the vessel was overrun by samurai.

== 20th century ==
=== Japanese occupation of Portuguese Timor ===
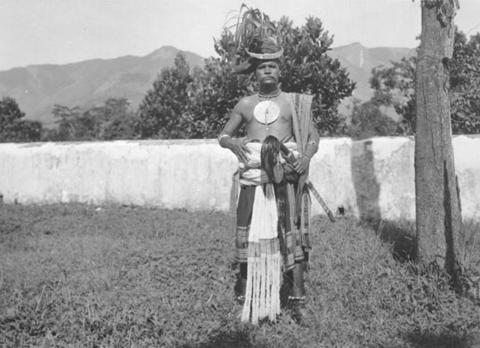
Timorese chieftain Dom Aleixo Corte-Real, who resisted Japanese rule and was executed by firing-squad.

During World War II, Japan invaded the Dutch East Indies, which shared the island of Timor with Portugal, who governed its eastern half, where no more than 150 Portuguese soldiers were stationed at. Despite being neutral in the conflict, or precisely because it refused to support allied actions that might hostilize Japan and trigger a German response in Europe, Australia and the Netherlands occupied Portuguese Timor with a force of 400 soldiers to secure their flank in West Timor. As a result, on the night of 19/20 February 1942 Japan invaded Portuguese Timor. Some Portuguese and Timorese voluntarily aided the allies with supplies or in combat but by 10 February 1943 all allied forces on Timor had been evacuated, along with some Portuguese.

Although the island remained occupied by the Japanese, Portuguese governor Manuel Ferreira de Carvalho was left in charge of some internal administration. On April 28, 1942, the governor wrote to Lisbon:

Most grave general situation impossible to save face with regards to the attitude of the Japanese towards the population who has suffered horrors without being possible to provide them any able aid seen as the troops do not respect anything.

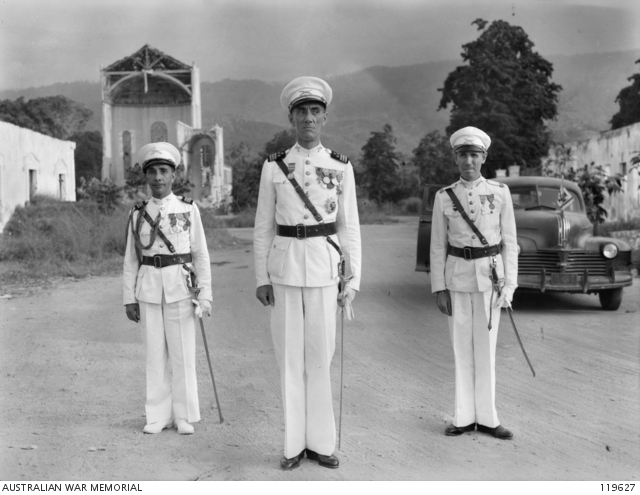
Governor Manuel Ferreira de Carvalho.

Most civilian deaths were caused by Japanese reprisals. The civilian death toll is estimated at 40,000 to 70,000.

Ultimately, Japanese forces remained in control of Timor until their surrender in September 1945, following the atomic bombings of Hiroshima and Nagasaki and the Soviet invasion of Manchuria.

After the Japanese surrender, diplomatic relations between Portugal and Japan remained cut until after the signing of the Treaty of San Francisco. Bilateral relations were reestablished on October 22, 1953.

== See also ==
- Military history of Portugal
- Portuguese Empire

== Bibliography ==
- Boxer, C. R. (1948). Fidalgos in the Far East, 1550–1770. The Hague: Martinus Nijhoff.
- Boxer, C. R. (1963). The great ship from Amacon: annals of Macao and the old Japan trade. Lisbon: Centro de Estudos Históricos Ultramarinos.
- Hesselink, Reinier H. (2015). The Dream of Christian Nagasaki: World Trade and the Clash of Cultures, 1560–1640. McFarland. ISBN 9780786499618.
- Boxer, C. R. (1951). The Christian Century in Japan: 1549–1650. University of California Press. GGKEY:BPN6N93KBJ7.
- Boxer, C. R. (1979) [1st. pub. 1929]. "The affair of the Madre de Deus". In Moscato, Michael (ed.). Papers on Portuguese, Dutch, and Jesuit Influences in 16th- and 17th-Century Japan: Writings of Charles Ralph Boxer. Washington, D.C.: University Publications of America. pp. 4–94. ISBN 0890932557.
