= Gaspar Vilela =

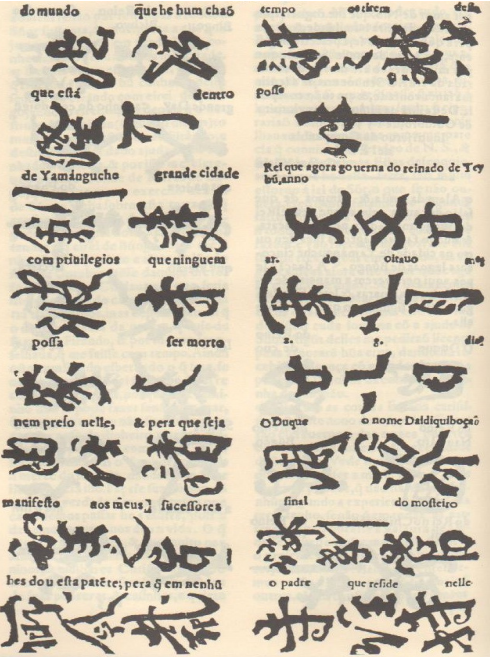
Gaspar Vilela - Kanji

Gaspar Vilela or Gaspar Villela (Avis, 1526 — Goa, Portuguese India, 4 February 1572), was a priest and Jesuit missionary, and his activity in Japan influenced the Portuguese and Christian presence.

== Early years ==
Born in 1526 in the village of Avis, Alentejo, Portugal. Gaspar Vilela was educated on the Military Order of Saint Bento of Avis

When he reached the level of a veteran he travelled in 1551 with Melchior Nunes Barreto, to India, for an evangelization mission.

He was ordered priest in Goa and entered in 1553 to the Company of Jesus, becoming a Jesuit missionary.

== Background ==
With the Portuguese discovery of the sea route to India via Indian Ocean in 1498, a Portuguese expansion in Asia started. The conquest of Cochim in 1503, of Goa in 1510, of Malaca in 1511, and the discovery of the Molucas (Spice Islands) in 1512, consolidated Portugal as a worldwide military and commercial power. In 1514 Portugal entered China and obtained a concession for Macau in 1557.

In China, the Ming dynasty substituted the Mongols in 1368, unifying China. During Gaspar Vilela's times the ruler was the Jiajing Emperor.

In 1453 the Ottoman Empire conquered Constantinople, ending the Byzantine Empire, opening completely the gates of Europe to Muslims.

=== Japan ===
The first reference in Europe about Japan comes from Marco Polo, with the mention of Cipango. The first Europeans to reach Japan were the Portuguese in 1543, by the hand of the pirate Wang Zhi, on the island of Tanegashima, starting rapidly trade relations, mainly firearms. The Portuguese people were called nanban, the "barbarians from the south".

The Portuguese found Japan in the middle of Sengoku period, in great turmoil. With the Ashikaga shogunate in decline (ended in 1573), the lords of the regions (daimyo) disputed the leadership of reconquering the centralized power. Only in 1600 would Japan be reunified again under shogun Tokugawa Ieyasu, who expelled the missionaries in 1614.

With the formidable Portuguese expansion the king John III of Portugal in 1539 asked Pope Paul III to send missionaries to embark on the Portuguese sea ships to evangelize the overseas lands. The Pope sent some Jesuits, amongst them Francisco Xavier, who arrived in 1541 at Goa. In 1549 Xavier reached Japan where he started the first congregations in Hirado, Yamaguchi and Bungo. In 1551, with the arrival of new missionaries Xavier departed for new missions.

Hirado was under the rule of the daimyo Matsura Takanobu, ally of Wang Zhi. Hirado was the first sea port used by the Portuguese. In 1561, after several attacks, the Portuguese choose to change the regular trade to the sea port of Yokoseura, dominated by daimyo Omura Sumitada. A Buddhist revolt in 1564 forced the Portuguese to change again, this time to a small fishing village called Nagasaki. In 1580 the Portuguese got a concession over Nagasaki, similar to Macau, that endured until Toyotomi Hideyoshi invaded it in 1586, keeping it however as the main port of entry to European trade.

== Mission to Japan ==
Gaspar Vilela was selected to integrate the Japanese missionary mission in 1554, disembarking in Bungo in 1556, in the east side of Kyushu island, under the supervision of Cosme de Torres, with the protection of daimyo Otomo Yoshishige, one of the first converts (baptized in 1578 with the name D. Francisco). The mission follows Francisco Xavier guidelines, seeking many and rapid conversions of the common people. Vilela belonging to a second wave of missionaries naturally employs Xavier methods in the beginning.

Vilela had the sensibility to understand the particularities of Japan, changing the methods to a Catechesis activity, taking advantage of the Japanese people's superior knowledge and educated ways.

The people on these lands have interests in literature, if they were Christians and live peaceful, wisdom would flourish here

One of the most important and useful things Vilela did, was to learn the Japanese language giving him the ability to talk directly to the people, without interpreters and frustrations. He turns also to the aristocracy, mainly daimyos, seeking their protection and funding.

The language is not that difficult to understand, because being myself rude by nature I know plenty of it, at least listening, and even if it was difficult we have already plenty of things written by God, which satisfy those who want to listen

Vilela also identifies the main Buddhist sects present in Japan, the Zen ("shaka") and the Amitaba ("amida").

Between 1558 and 1559 at Hirado Vilela baptized more than 600 people. Over the next 2 years, more than 1300 people have been converted on the Tokushima island and others places. In 1563 Omura Sumitada converted (with the name D. Bartolomeu) to please the Portuguese and acquire their preference to pick his sea port and enrich with the commerce.

However, the aggressive activity of Vilela provokes the demolishing of three Buddhist temples, building Christian temples in their place. He also threw Buddhists objects into the sea, and destroyed pagodes replacing them with crosses. This triggered many conflicts and antagonisms with the Buddhists. In 1558 daimyo Matsura Takanobu expelled the Jesuits from Hirado, including Vilela, the main character of the fury.

In 1564, the Buddhist community infuriated by the conversion of the daimyo Omura Sumitada were instigated by the Buddhist monks and leaders to revolt, destroying Yokoseura, including the sea port, forcing the Portuguese residents and sea ships to move elsewhere. A small fishing village called Nagasaki is chosen, on which Vilela participates.

In Nagasaki a church is built, probably called São Paulo, where Vilela celebrated mass.

In 1559 he travelled to Kyoto, in the center of Japan, ruled by daimyo Oda Nobunaga. He welcomed and guided Luís Fróis in this period, founding the first mission in the region in 1560. In 1563 he had a dispute in Nara with the astronomer Yûki Yamashiro and the Confucianist Kiyohara Ekata, but he was able to make the latter convert to Christianity. He also debated with the masters of the court, making him very popular and respected. Because of the instabilities in Japan, the missionaries were expelled also from Kyoto in 1565. Vilela also extended his activity to Sakai.

== Final years ==
In a letter dated 3 November 1571, Vilela describes his abortive plans for a pastoral ministry among the Korean people. Although historians are unuclear about why the mission was aborted, Vilela saw the Korean mission as a stepping stone into China. The letter is the earliest surviving evidence of European plans to conduct missionary work in the Korean peninsula.

Vilela was finally called by his hierarchy, returning to Cochin in 1571.

He left for Goa where he retired and died on 4 February 1572, he was 47 years old.

== Literature Works ==
- "Controversias contra todas as seytas do Japão. Nellas refutava concludentemente todos os argumentos pelos Mestres da Corte de Meaco"
- "História das vidas dos Santos"
- "Documentos Espirituais"

== Bibliography ==
- Machado, Diogo (1741). "Bibliotheca lusitana historica, critica, e cronologica. Na qual se comprehende a noticia dos authores portuguezes, e das obras, que compuseraõ desde o tempo da promulgação da Ley da Graça até o tempo prezente". Biblioteca Lusitana (in Portuguese). Vol. 2.
- Boscariol, Mariana (2013). No que toca à língua e adaptação na metodologia de trabalho jesuíta no Japão: Gaspar Vilela, Alessandro Valignano e João Rodrigues (1549-1620) (PDF) (Thesis) (in Portuguese). Universidade de São Paulo, Brasil.
- Rocha, Helena (2014). "O Oriente no Ocidente : o Japão na cultura portuguesa do século XVI - a visão de Luís Fróis nas Cartas de Évora" (PDF). Repositório das Universidades Lusíada. Universidade Lusíada, Portugal.
- Galvão, António (1563). "Tratado de António Galvão, escrito em 1563". Arquivo Digital da BNP (in Portuguese). Biblioteca Nacional de Portugal.
- Boxer, C. R. (1951). The Christian Century in Japan. University of California Press.

== See also ==
- Luís Fróis
- Arrival of a Portuguese ship
