= Donation of Bartolomeu =

1580 cession of Nagasaki to the Society of Jesus

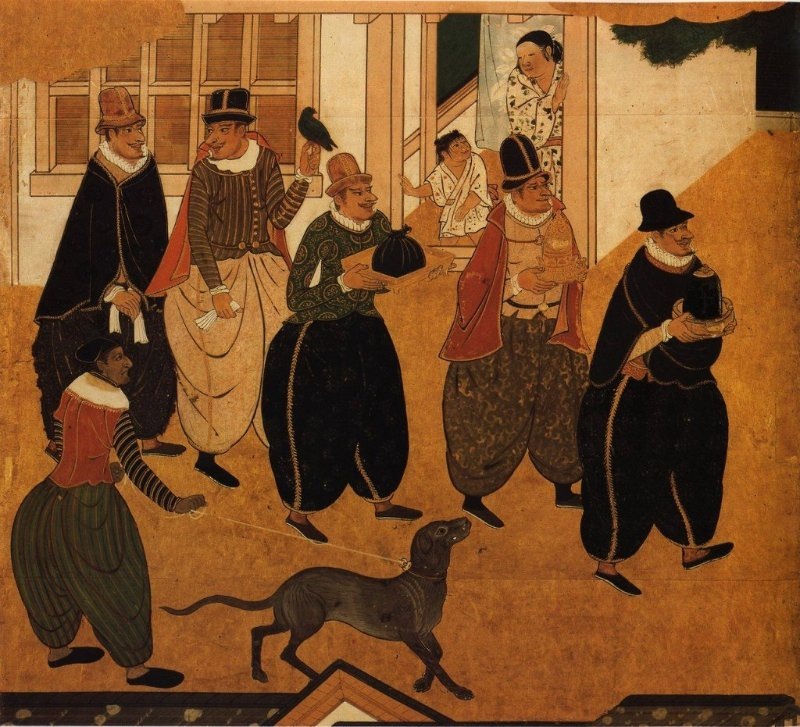
Portuguese silktraders in Nagasaki, c. 1600

The Donation of Bartolomeu (or the Cessation of Nagasaki) was a legal act issued on June 9, 1580, by the Kirishitan daimyō Ōmura Sumitada (baptized as Dom Bartolomeu). Through this charter, Sumitada ceded the port towns of Nagasaki and Mogi in perpetuity to the Society of Jesus (Jesuits).

Intended both to secure a safe haven for Christians and to protect Sumitada's domains during the chaos of the Sengoku period, the donation gave Nagasaki a unique character, setting it apart from all other Japanese cities.

Under Jesuit administration (1580–1587), Nagasaki grew into a principal hub for commerce and missionary activity. This administration lasted until the territory was reclaimed by Toyotomi Hideyoshi.

The fusion of Japanese and European cultures became a rare experience in history, especially considering the isolation and resistance to foreign influence often practiced by the Japanese.

== Background ==
Nagasaki first appears in the narrative during the Sengoku period in 1569, when Ōtomo Sōrin campaigned against Ryūzōji. Ryūzōji secretly sought assistance from the powerful Mōri of Yamaguchi. 70,000 men under Kikkawa Motoharu and Kobayakawa Takakage were to be sent to Kyushu but were later threatened and withdrawn.

In the spring of 1570, the Portuguese sent a small boat to the bay of Nagasaki, sounding the waters and exploring its geography. Seeing that it was a suitable anchorage, they asked permission to establish a port there, but Kirishitan daimyō Ōmura Sumitada (baptized as Dom Bartolomeu) at first refused. The Portuguese then asked Arima Shuri Taiyu Yoshisada, Sumitada's elder brother, to intercede on their behalf. Yoshisada sent a letter asking Sumitada to grant the favor, and Sumitada finally agreed.

After the agreement, the Jesuits began to settle Japanese Christians there, making it a permanent place of refuge for baptized refugees and for the yearly Portuguese nau. Originally, the Portuguese had used the harbor of Fukuda, but by 1570 it was deemed too exposed to the Sumō Sea. From 1571, they shifted to Nagasaki, which, though only a small cluster of fishing hamlets around the fort of Ōmura Sumitada's vassal Nagasaki Jinzaemon Sumikage, it possessed a great natural harbor. In March 1571, Sumitada ordered his vassal Tomonaga Tsushima to draw up a plan for the new town. The plan divided the settlement into six wards: Shimabara-machi, Ōmura-machi, Bunchi-machi (now part of Hokaura-machi), Hokaura-machi, Hirado-machi, and Yokoseura-machi (now part of Hirado-machi). These six wards, known as the Inner Town, were chosen as the port for trade with the foreign ships.

== Attacks on Nagasaki ==
Attacks on Nagasaki
- Part of Sengoku period
Date	1574–1579
Location	Nagasaki, Japan
Result	Ōmura victory in Nagasaki; Ryūzōji victory in Ōmura domain
Territorial changes	Ōmura surrenders and becomes a vassal of Ryūzōji; Nagasaki and Mogi ceded to the Society of Jesus

Belligerents
Ōmura clan Society of Jesus; Kingdom of Portugal	Ryūzōji clan Matsura clan

Commanders and leaders
Ōmura Sumitada (surrendered); Gaspar Coelho; Simão de Mendonça	Fukahori Sumikata; Ryūzōji Takanobu; Matsura Shigenobu

Nagasaki was repeatedly threatened by Gotō Takaaki, Saigō Sumitaka of Isahaya and Fukahori Sumikata, who opposed Ōmura Sumitada's alliance with the foreigners and turned as Ryūzōji henchmen. In 1574, Fukahori, along with his brother and ally, led a fleet of 60 ships to attack Nagasaki and the new port town by sea. According to Luís Fróis, rumors spread that Sumitada's fortress had fallen, causing despair to the residents of Nagasaki. Nagasaki Jinzaemon, believing the Jesuits to be the cause of the attack, refused to defend the town or provide shelter to the missionaries. A messenger was sent to Ōmura, and Sumitada ordered that the port town not be abandoned. Padre Gaspar Coelho and his followers then fortified the residence with a wooden palisade and a ditch around the church and the six wards. Soon after, Captain General Simão de Mendonça arrived with four Portuguese ships to aid Sumitada.

In August 1575, Vasco Pereira arrived in Nagasaki aboard a carrack to strengthen the city's defenses. By that time, Nagasaki had a militia of around 400 men and a population of about 2,000. However, the following year, Sumitada's northern rivals, Ryūzōji Takanobu and Matsura Shigenobu of Hirado, formed an alliance and attacked the Ōmura Domain from three sides. Takanobu himself established camp at Kaize, around five kilometers from Sumitada's stronghold, with a force of 8,000 men. After losing the battle, Sumitada surrendered and signed an oath on July 12.

After attacking Ōmura, the Isahaya allies attacked Nagasaki again by sea and land, burning a small hamlet of fishermen outside the fortified port and Nagasaki village, including the residence of the lord and the church of Todos os Santos. From the fortified position on Morisaki cape, the Jesuit father and the Christians watched the attack. Four men from Shiki helped organize a counteroffensive, in which many defenders died but nine opposing leaders were killed, forcing them to withdraw.

== Cession of Nagasaki ==
Donation of Bartolomeu
- Date: June 9, 1580
- Location: Nagasaki, Japan
- Type: Cession of territory
- Participants: Ōmura Sumitada; Alessandro Valignano
- Outcome: Nagasaki under Jesuit administration (1580–1587)

After continued threat from Ryūzōji, Ōmura Sumitada executed the so called "Donation of Bartolomeu" on 9 June 1580 (27 of the 4th moon, Tenshō 8).

This agreement, signed between Sumitada and the Jesuit Alessandro Valignano, placed Nagasaki and Mogi under Jesuit administrative rule. Although the original Japanese document is lost, a contemporary Spanish version sent by Valignano to the Jesuit Father General survives in the Jesuit Archives in Rome. The donation granted the Jesuits authority to appoint the captain of the port and to collect the portuary fees from the Portuguese ship, while Sumitada retained the dues from all other ships entering Nagasaki.

According to Valignano, Sumitada's main motive for this cession was to protect the territory against his rival domains, especially that of Ryūzōji Takanobu, and to ensure a safe haven and access to Portuguese trade in case Ōmura was attacked. However, some Japanese sources suggest that Sumitada's financial debts to the Jesuits may have pressured him into giving up his control over Nagasaki, whereas Jesuit sources claim he did so voluntarily.

Two weeks after the agreement, Valignano ordered the fortification of both Nagasaki and Mogi with artillery and ammunition to withstand future attacks. Though Mogi was a small village, it offered an alternative maritime route from Nagasaki to the Arima peninsula, avoiding land under Ryūzōji Takanobu. This link formed part of the "kirishitan belt", a route connecting Christian missions across Kyushu and extending as far as Kyoto.

== Bibliography ==
- Elison, George (March 17, 2020). Deus Destroyed. Brill. ISBN 9781684172795.
- Hall, John Whitney, ed. (1991). The Cambridge History of Japan. Vol. 4. Cambridge University Press. ISBN 978-0-521-22355-3.
- Pacheco, Diego (1970). "The Founding of the Port of Nagasaki and its Cession to the Society of Jesus". Monumenta Nipponica. 25 (3–4): 303–323. doi:10.2307/2383539. JSTOR 2383539.
- Tronu Montane, Carla (2012). Sacred Space and Ritual in Early Modern Japan: The Christian Community of Nagasaki (1569-1643) (Thesis). School of Oriental and African Studies, University of London. p. 286. doi:10.25501/SOAS.00013820.
- Hesselink, Reinier H. (December 11, 2015). The Dream of Christian Nagasaki. McFarland, Incorporated, Publishers. ISBN 9781476624747.
- De Sousa, Luís (January 21, 2019). The Portuguese Slave Trade in Early Modern Japan. Brill. ISBN 9789004388079.
- Castel-Branco, Cristina; Paes, Margarida (June–December 2009). "Fusion urban planning in the 16th century. Japanese and Portuguese founding Nagasaki" (PDF). Bulletin of Portuguese - Japanese Studies. 18–19. Lisboa: Universidade Nova de Lisboa: 67–103. ISSN 0874-8438.
