= Battle of Fukuda Bay =

1565 Portuguese naval victory over Japan

- Part of the Sengoku period and Japanese–Portuguese conflicts
Date	18 October 1565
Location	Fukuda Bay, Nagasaki, Kyushu 32.745°N 129.825°E
Result	Portuguese victory

Belligerents
Matsura clan	Portuguese Empire

Commanders and leaders
Matsura Takanobu	João Pereira

Strength
8–10 large junks; c. 60 smaller boats; 700 samurai	1 carrack; 1 galleon; 80+ crewmen

Casualties and losses
3 junks sunk; over 70 killed; 200 wounded	8 killed
- Location within Japan

The Battle of Fukuda Bay (福田浦の戦い, Fukudaura no tatakai) in 1565 was the first recorded naval battle between Europeans (the Portuguese) and the Japanese. A flotilla of samurai under the daimyo Matsura Takanobu attacked two Portuguese trade vessels that had shunned Matsura's port in Hirado and had gone instead to trade at Fukuda (now within Nagasaki), a port belonging to the rival Ōmura Sumitada. The engagement was part of a process of trial and error by the Portuguese traders to find a safe harbour for their carracks in Japan that eventually brought them to Nagasaki.

The samurai suffered heavy losses in ships and men from cannon fire and withdrew.

== Background ==
In 1543, Europeans reached Japan for the first time when a junk belonging to the Chinese wokou pirate lord Wang Zhi carrying Portuguese traders was shipwrecked at Tanegashima. The Portuguese introduced the arquebus to the Japanese during this chance encounter, which gave the Japanese, embroiled in the bloody Sengoku period at the time, a powerful weapon with which they conducted their internecine wars. The discovery of Japan was attractive to Portuguese merchants and missionaries alike; it gave the merchants a new market to sell their goods, and the Jesuit missionaries eyed Japan for new converts to Christianity. The warlords of Kyushu vied to entice the Portuguese carracks (called the Black Ships by the Japanese) into their harbours since the ships also brought considerable wealth to their fiefdoms in addition to guns.

The Portuguese initially made Hirado their preferred port of call since it was familiar to their wokou partners; however, they also visited the ports of Kagoshima, Yamagawa, Hiji, and Funai from time to time. The Jesuits felt that the carracks should take turns visiting each port of Kyushu so the priests could cover more ground and convert more people, but the merchants had other priorities: the carracks had to land at a harbour that protected their valuable cargo from the wind and weather, and a stable port of call was essential to build a reliable clientele. The daimyo of Hirado, Matsura Takanobu, at first accommodated the missionaries due to their association with the Portuguese traders, but became hostile once he felt they overdid their evangelization by burning books and destroying Buddhist images. Takanobu evicted the missionaries from Hirado in 1558 and did not allow them to return for five years. In 1561, 15 Portuguese were killed in Hirado in a brawl with the Japanese, while a captain was killed in Akune, marking the first recorded clashes between Europeans and the Japanese (Miyanomae incident).

Faced with such events, the Portuguese found it prudent to find a safer port to call. Yokoseura (in present-day Saikai, Nagasaki) was found to be a suitable harbour. The local daimyo, Ōmura Sumitada, was so receptive to the teachings of Christianity that he converted in 1563, making him the first Christian daimyo. The Portuguese landed at Yokoseura in 1562 and 1563. In November 1563, some Ōmura vassals, incensed at his conversion to Christianity, rebelled, and Yokoseura was burned down during the chaos. The Portuguese returned to Hirado the next year, despite Jesuit warnings, but Takanobu allegedly started a fire that burned a substantial part of the Portuguese goods. The Portuguese could not safely conduct their trade in Hirado.

== Battle ==
In 1565, Captain-major João Pereira sailed his carrack to the port of Yokoseura, intending to go to trade in Hirado. He was dissuaded from doing so by the Jesuits in Yokoseura. He was persuaded to head to another Ōmura anchorage at the bay of Fukuda, within present-day Nagasaki, accompanied by a small galleon belonging to Diogo de Meneses, the captain of Malacca. Deprived of his potential pickings, Takanobu sought to punish the Portuguese for switching ports and conspired with Sakai merchants who had come to Hirado for naught. Matsura promised to divide the booty with the Sakai merchants in return for the loan of eight to ten of their large junks and added up to sixty smaller Japanese boats to form a flotilla carrying several hundred samurai to sail to Fukuda. The Jesuit fathers in Hirado sent warnings to Pereira when they realized what Takanobu was doing, but Pereira dismissed the threat. He was, hence, surprised when he saw the Hirado flotilla approach.

The flotilla attacked the carrack in the morning of 18 October, when most of the crew were on the shore and could not return to the ship in time. This left only about 80 Europeans on the flagship, with an unknown number of African slaves, and Chinese merchants taking refuge. The Japanese boats focused on boarding the larger carrack and, at one point, climbed aboard from the stern and shot a musket at Pereira, denting his helmet. The Japanese then entered the great cabin, briefly holding the captain-major hostage and carrying off his writing desk before being repelled. The flotilla's focus on the carrack left it exposed to the Portuguese galleon, which was able to support the carrack by catching the Japanese flotilla in the two ships' crossfire. The cannons wrought such havoc on the frail Japanese boats that the Hirado forces, after losing three ships and over 70 men, in addition to over 200 wounded, withdrew to their base, crestfallen. The battle lasted two hours. The victorious carrack, suffering only eight dead, set sail for Macao at the end of November.

== Aftermath ==
The Jesuits in Hirado wrote jubilantly of the Portuguese victory, which increased Portuguese prestige in Japanese eyes, "for the Japanese had hitherto only known us as merchants, and rated us no better than the Chinese". The Japanese also came to respect the superiority of Western gunpowder weapons. The Portuguese continued to call at Fukuda and nearby Kuchinotsu for a few more years. Still, they felt the terrain of these ports was unsuitable and kept searching until Ōmura Sumitada offered the Jesuits the nearby port of Nagasaki, a mere fishing village at the time, that the Portuguese found to be perfect. From 1571 onward, the Portuguese traders focused their activities on Nagasaki, turning it into the hub of Japan's foreign trade and its window to the West until the 19th century.

== See also ==
- Siege of Moji (1561) – A Portuguese carrack joined a Japanese battle in what became the first European naval bombardment of Japan.
- Battle of Manila (1574) – A Chinese and Japanese pirate fleet attacked Manila intending to capture the city.
- Battle of Cagayan (1582) – Battles between Wokou pirates and a Spanish flotilla.
- Nossa Senhora da Graça incident (1610) – A Japanese flotilla attacked a Portuguese carrack, which ended in the latter's sinking.
