= Operation Lagarto =

Australian military operation in Timor during WWII

- Part of South West Pacific theatre of World War II
Date	1 July – 29 September 1943
Location	Timor
Result	Japanese victory

Belligerents
Australia; Portugal	Empire of Japan

Commanders and leaders
Manuel de Jesus Pires (POW)	Unknown

Strength
34 peak	Unknown

Casualties and losses
Unknown	Unknown

Operation Lagarto was an Australian military operation in Timor during World War II in 1943. It was run by the Services Reconnaissance Department. The Naval component of the mission was named Operation Mosquito. The operation was ambushed and captured. Japanese intelligence used information from the mission to lure other Australian commandos to Timor where they were captured and killed, notably Operation Cobra (Timor), Operation Sunlag and Operation Suncob.

== Background ==
The mission was led by Lt. Manuel de Jesus Pires, a Portuguese army pilot who had been the administrator of a large Timorese province and who had been evacuated from Timor. In 1943 he was placed in charge of a four-man team under the SRD to go back to Timor and evacuate over 100 refugees, establish an informant net to cover enemy movements, and report on enemy activities. He was accompanied by:

- radio operator - a civilian who had run the Dili radio station before the war, Patricio Luz.
- two Portuguese NCS

== Actions ==
The team landed by American submarine on 1 July 1943 at the mouth of the Luca River. Radio contact was maintained. A month later 87 refugees were taken out. Sgt Ellwood joined the team as an Australian liaison officer. The team suffered constant attacks from the Japanese. The team grew to 34 including Pires' mistress. He eventually got the team down to eight. On 29 September 1943 the company was captured by locals who handed them over to the Japanese. Luz manage to escape. Ellwood was captured along with the others. The Japanese beat Ellwood and managed to get him to operate his set, giving messages to SRD. He gave false messages to SRD who did not seem to notice anything strange.

== Rescue attempts ==
- Operation Lagartout was sent to rescue them but was abandoned.
- Operation Cobra (Timor) was sent to rescue the men and was captured; Ellwood tried to escape to warn them but was captured. A third team was later captured as well. Ellwood and the leader of Cobra, Lt Cashman, were flown to Singapore.
