= Operation Cobra (disambiguation) =

Operation Cobra was a 1944 World War II battle in Normandy.

Operation Cobra may also refer to:

- Operation Cobra (Timor), an Australian 1944 military operation in Timor
- Inferno (1997 film) or Operation Cobra, an American/Indian film
- Operation Cobra (web series), a 2019 Indian web series starring Gautam Gulati
- "Operation Cobra", a campaign in Company of Heroes

== See also ==
- Operation Cobra Sweep and Operation Cobra Strike, coalition military operations of the Iraq War
