= Nagasaki Sumikage =

Nagasaki Jinzaemon Sumikage (長崎 甚左衛門純景; 1548–1621) (baptized as Bernardo) was a vassal of Ōmura Sumitada and the lord of Nagasaki in Hizen Province.

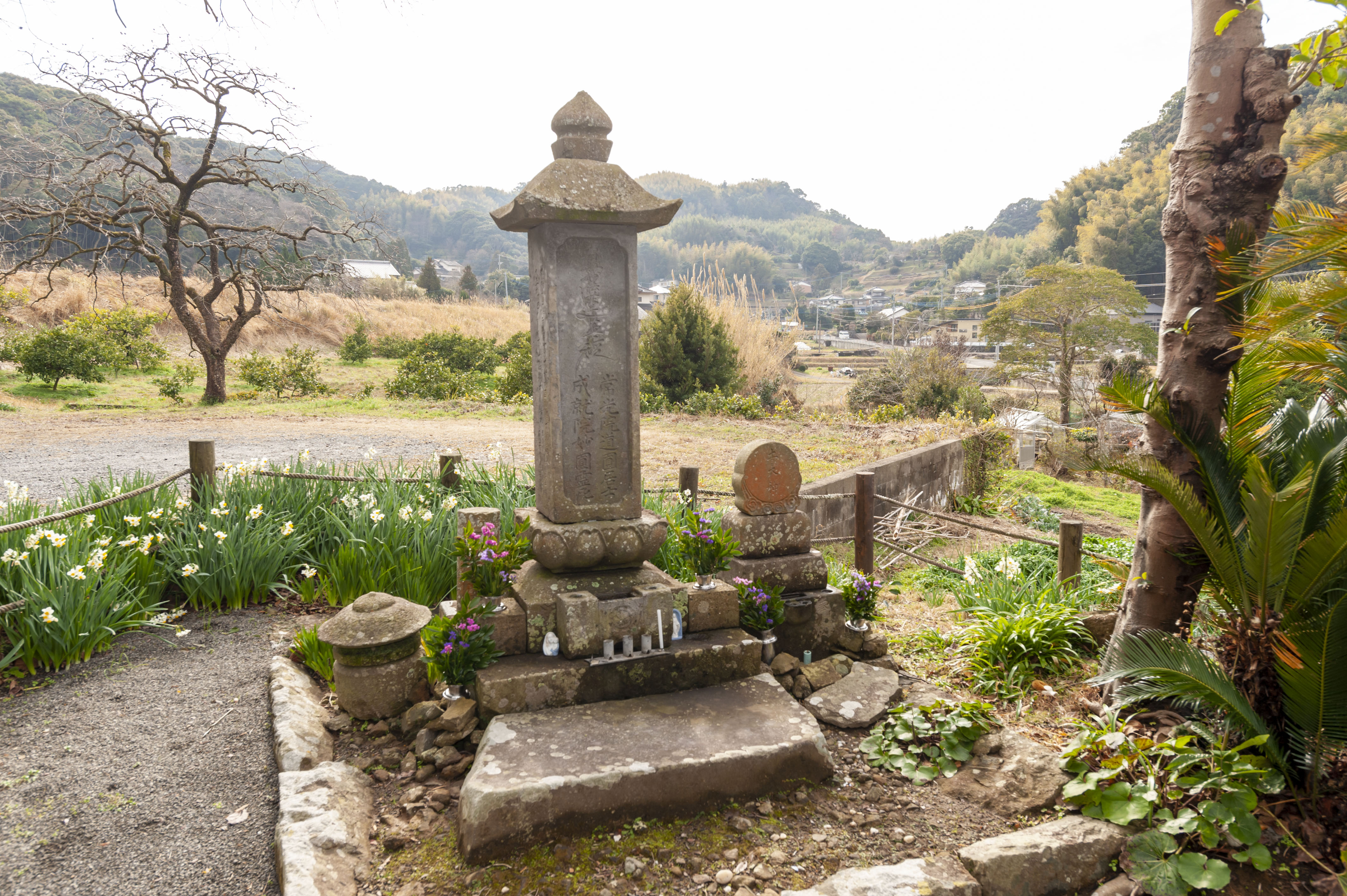
Grave of Nagasaki Sumikage
