= Blockade of Nagasaki (1647) =

- Part of the Sakoku period and Japanese–Portuguese conflicts
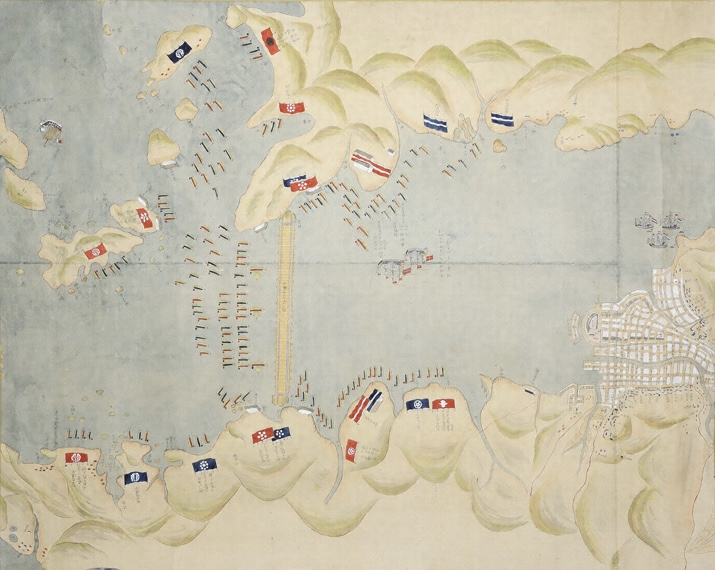
- Map of the blockade
Date	26 July – 3 September 1647
Location	Nagasaki, Japan

Belligerents
Kingdom of Portugal	Tokugawa shogunate Mobilized clans: Fukuoka Domain; Saga Domain; Kumamoto Domain; Yanagawa Domain; Kokura Domain; Karatsu Domain; Matsuyama Domain; Imabari Domain

Commanders and leaders
Gonçalo de Sequeira de Sousa	Governors of Nagasaki; Nabeshima Katsushige

Strength
2 galleons	2,000 vessels 50,400 men

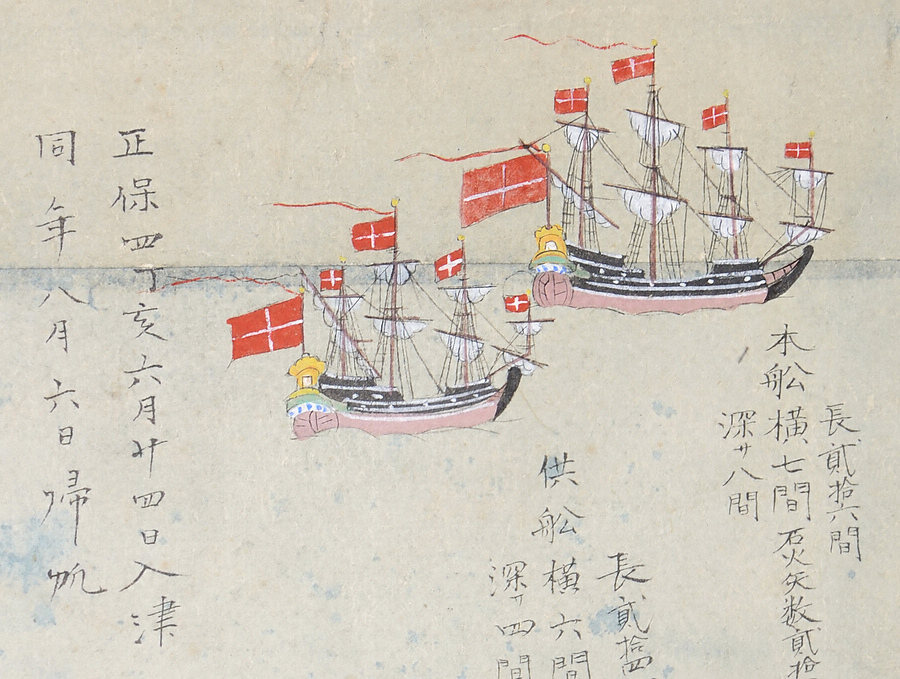
The two Portuguese galleons of the embassy

The Blockade of Nagasaki (Portuguese: Bloqueio de Nagasáqui) was a bloodless military standoff and diplomatic crisis that took place between 26 July and 3 September 1647, in Nagasaki, Japan.

== Bibliography ==
- Saturnino Monteiro, Armando da Silva (1995). Batalhas e Combates da Marinha Portuguesa (1626-1668) (in Portuguese). Vol. VI. Lisbon: Livraria Sá da Costa. pp. 279–282. ISBN 972-562-323-1.
- Rodrigues Pereira, José António (2019). "18". Grandes Batalhas Navais Portuguesas (in Portuguese). Livraria Sá da Costa. pp. 197–207.
- Boxer, C. R. (1928). A Portuguese Embassy to Japan (1644-1647) (PDF). London: Kegan Paul, Trench, Trubner & Co., Ltd.
