= Operation Suncob =

Australian military operation in Timor

- Part of South West Pacific theatre of World War II
Date	2 July 1945
Location	Timor
Result	Japanese victory

Belligerents
Australia	Empire of Japan

Commanders and leaders
Captain P. Wynne (POW)	Unknown

Strength
2	Unknown

Casualties and losses
2 captured	Unknown

Operation Suncob was a military operation by the Australian Army in Timor in 1945 to investigate what happened to Operation Cobra. It consisted of Captain P. Wynne and Corporal J.B. Lawrence, both AIF and Z Special Unit. They were inserted into Timor on 2 July 1945 despite the Services Reconnaissance Department not hearing back from Operation Sunlag which had been undertaken shortly prior. Both men were captured and tortured by the Japanese.

It had the same aim as Operation Pigeon.

== Notes ==
- "The Official History of the Operations and Administration of] Special Operations - Australia [(SOA), also known as the Inter-Allied Services Department (ISD) and Services Reconnaissance Department (SRD)] Volume 2 - Operations Part 1 page 63-65". National Archives of Australia. pp. 155–159.
- Silver, Lynette Ramsay (1990). The Heroes of Rimau: Unravelling the Mystery of One of World War II's Most Daring Raids Hardcover. Birchgrove, New South Wales: Sally Milner Publishing. ISBN 9781863510530.
