= Yokoseura =

Port in Kyushu, Japan

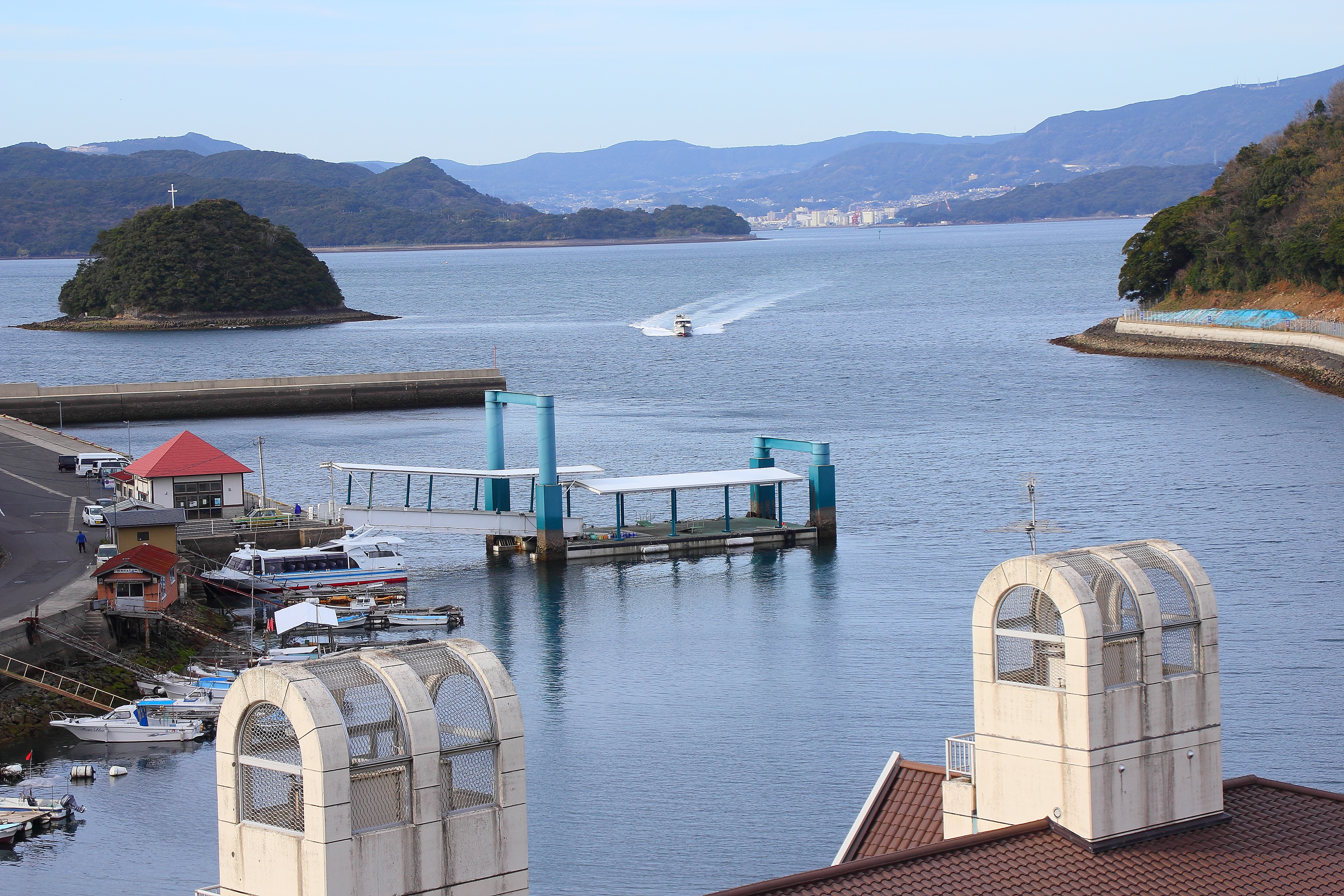
Yokoseura (2015)

Yokoseura (横瀬浦) is a port located at the northern tip of the Nishisonogi Peninsula on the Japanese island of Kyushu, administratively under Saikai city, Nagasaki Prefecture. It was developed as an entrepot by the Portuguese in 1562 with the permission of the local lord Ōmura Sumitada, but was burned down a year later during a rebellion against Sumitada.

== History ==
=== Background ===
In 1543, Europeans reached Japan for the first time when a Chinese junk carrying Portuguese traders shipwrecked on Tanegashima. The Portuguese introduced the arquebus to the Japanese during this chance encounter, which gave the Japanese, undergoing the bloody Sengoku period at the time, a powerful weapon with which they conducted their internecine wars. The discovery of Japan was attractive to Portuguese merchants and missionaries alike, for it gave the merchants a new market to trade their goods, and the Jesuit missionaries eyed Japan for new converts into Christianity. Likewise, the warlords of Kyushu vied to get the Portuguese carrack (called the black ship by the Japanese) into their harbours, since the ship also brought considerable wealth to their fiefdoms in addition to the guns.

The Portuguese initially made Hirado their preferred port of call, although they also visited the ports in Satsuma and Bungo from time to time. The Jesuits felt that the carrack should take turns visiting each port of Kyushu so the priests could cover more ground and convert more people, but the merchants had other priorities in mind: the carrack had to land at a harbour that protected their valuable cargo from the wind and weather, and a stable port of call was essential to build a reliable clientele. The daimyō of Hirado, Matsura Takanobu, was initially accommodative to the missionaries due to their association with the Portuguese traders, but turned hostile once he felt they overdid their evangelization by burning books and destroying Buddhist images. Matsura Takanobu evicted the missionaries from Hirado in 1558, and did not allow them to come back for five years. In 1561, 15 Portuguese were killed in Hirado in a brawl with the Japanese; a captain was also killed in Akune, marking the first recorded clashes between Europeans and the Japanese. Faced with such events, it became clear to the Portuguese that they needed to find a safer port to call.

=== Establishment of the Christian community ===
Under the urgings of the Jesuit viceprovincial Cosme de Torres to find a new port, the Portuguese sounded the harbour of Yokoseura on a discreet fishing boat and found it suitable for large Portuguese ships. Crucially, the local lord Ōmura Sumitada was more than willing to accommodate the foreigners. Ōmura Sumitada's district of Sonogi in Hizen Province was mountainous and lacking in resources. His hold onto these lands was not stable due to an ongoing succession feud, in which Sumitada, an adopted son of Ōmura Sumisaki (大村純前), was placed in charge instead of the biological but illegitimate son Gotō Takaakira (後藤貴明). For these reasons Sumitada depended on the deep water ports to keep himself in power, even if that meant following the European religion. Sumitada communicated to the missionaries that he would be happy to receive the Portuguese in Yokoseura. In addition, he would let the Jesuits build a church there, make Yokoseura exempt from taxes for ten years, and forbid non-Christians to stay there. With such promising prospects, the Jesuits directed the Portuguese carrack into Yokoseura the next year in 1562.

With Sumitada's blessing, a church was built in Yokoseura where a Buddhist temple had once stood, and an enormous wooden cross, 18 feet high and 9 feet wide, was erected in front of the church. Soon, the exclusively Christian community, the first of its kind in Japan, attracted Christians and merchants from as far as Kyoto. By April 1563, the population of Yokoseura numbered around 300 Christians. Sumitada took an active interest in Christianity, such that he built himself a residence in Yokoseura next to the church and made attending mass compulsory for all residents of Yokoseura. In early June 1563, Sumitada was baptised in the church of Yokoseura, took the baptismal name Bartolomeu, and became known as the first Christian daimyō.

=== Destruction ===
Sumitada turned out to be quite a fervent Christian. He adorned himself in Christian symbols in place of his traditional familial emblem, razed Buddhist temples, and burned the spirit tablet of his adoptive father Sumisaki. This last act incensed the unbaptised members of the Ōmura clan, who rallied behind Gotō Takaakira. Rumours reached Yokoseura on 8 August that Takaakira was plotting to kill Sumitada and Cosme de Torres, but this was contradicted five days later by news that Takaakira had sent for a priest to give him a sermon. A party was assembled under the convert Tomonaga Shinsuke (朝長新助, Christian name Luis) to bring the priests Luís Fróis and Juan Fernández to Takaakira's town of Takeo, but Fróis was too sick to travel and the priests decided to stay behind. Tomonaga went on ahead with the party, only to be ambushed and slaughtered by Takaakira's men near the Hario Strait (針尾瀬戸) on August 17. Believing the missionaries to be dead, Takaakira moved to attack Sumitada in his home city of Ōmura, putting him to flight. Having lost the military backing of Sumitada, the situation in Yokoseura became insecure, and the Japanese merchants decided to leave the town on the morning of August 18. That night, opportunistic merchants from Bungo Province burned down Yokoseura as they stood to lose if the Portuguese became permanently settled and not go to Bungo any more. To make that point clear, they abducted the sickly Cosme de Torres and Luís Fróis and tried to use the priests to blackmail the Portuguese into trading in Bungo. The two were finally released on August 20.

With Yokoseura destroyed, the Portuguese were forced to return to Hirado to trade while they find a new anchorage. Sumitada survived the coup and regained control of the Ōmura clan, and in 1565 directed the Portuguese to the port of Fukuda, closer to his home city of Ōmura. Matsura Takanobu, the daimyō of Hirado, sent a fleet to destroy this new anchorage to protect his own mercantile interests, but it was repelled by the Portuguese in the battle of Fukuda Bay. The Portuguese continued to call at Fukuda and the nearby Kuchinotsu for a few more years, but they felt the terrains of these ports were lacking and kept searching until Sumitada offered the Jesuits the nearby port of Nagasaki, a mere fishing village at the time that the Portuguese found to be perfect. The former inhabitants of Yokoseura were moved to Nagasaki, and from 1571 onward the Portuguese traders focused their activities there, turning it into the hub of Japan's foreign trade and its window to the West until the 19th century.

== Tourism ==
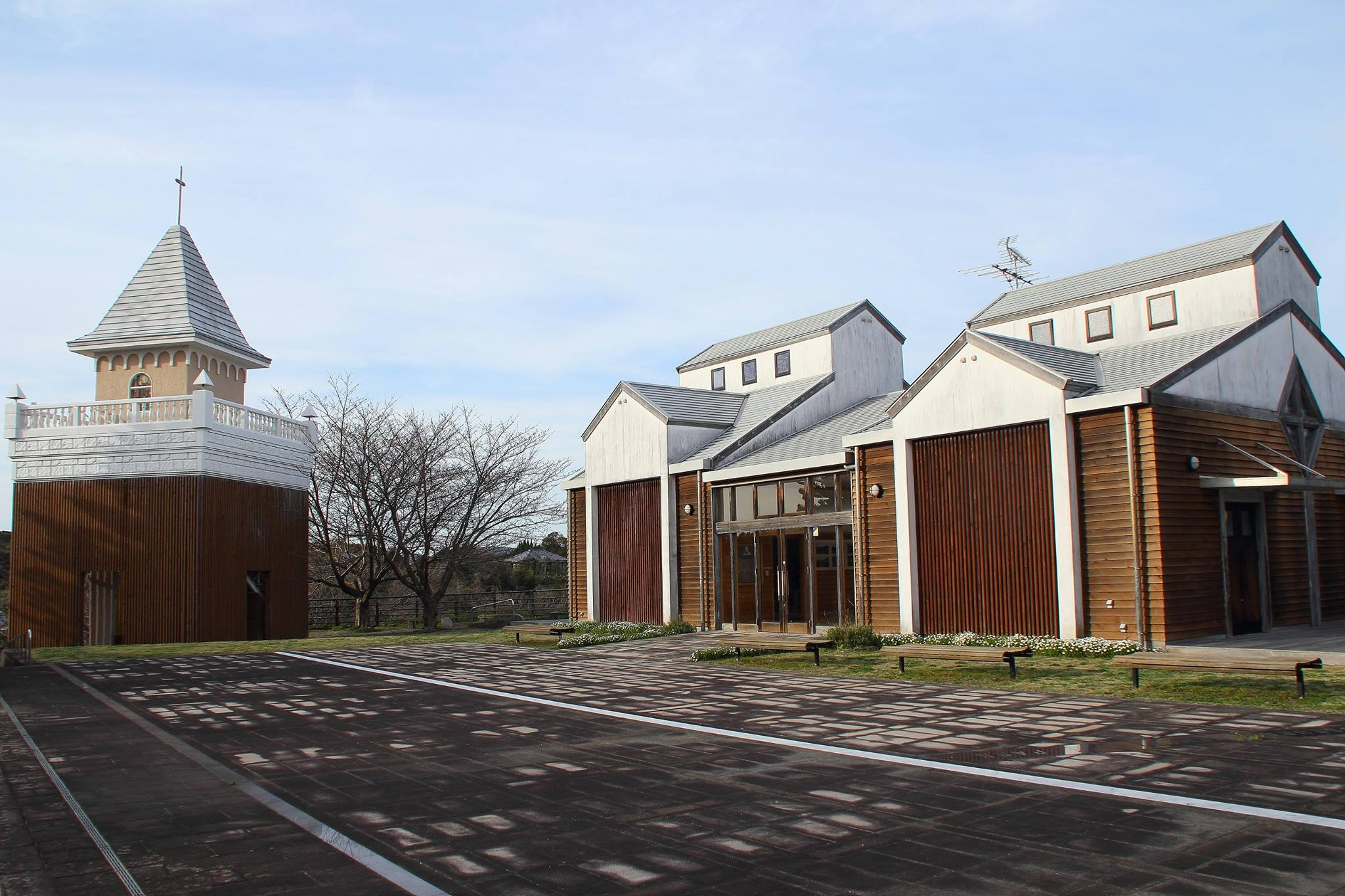
Yokoseura Historical Park

The destruction of Yokoseura in 1563, to which followed the seclusion of Japan and the persecution of Christians in the Edo period, left no physical trace of the Yokoseura Christian settlement today. However, as Yokoseura was the place where Luís Fróis (who went on to write the seminal Historia de Iapam) first landed in Japan, and where the first Christian daimyō received baptism, the Saikai city government decided to develop Yokoseura as a potential tourist attraction. The Yokoseura Historical Park (横瀬浦史跡公園) was completed in 2003, with structures within it built according to Alessandro Valignano's principles for building churches in Japan.
