= Operation Sunlag =

- Part of South West Pacific theatre of World War II
Date	29 June – 5 August 1945
Location	Timor
Result	Allied victory

Belligerents
Australia	Empire of Japan

Commanders and leaders
Captain A.D. Stevenson	Unknown

Strength
3	Unknown

Casualties and losses
None	Unknown

Operation Sunlag was an Australian military operation in Timor during World War II. Its aim was to investigate what happened to Operation Lagarto.

== Background ==
On 23 April 1945, Suncharlie operatives, connected to Sunlag, were deployed from HMAS River Snake, an Australian built Country Craft, some using Hoehn military folboats (collapsible canoes). Although this operation was intended to be for long term intelligence work, they returned to Riversnake on 26 April 1945.

== Actions ==
On 29 June 1945, the Sunlag party parachuted in from a Liberator from No. 200 Flight RAAF to relieve Lagarto. Captain A.D. Stevenson and Sergeant R.G. Dawson, both of Z Special Unit, and Celestino dos Anjos, a Timorese guide, were parachuted into Timor two days ahead of a proposed supply drop to Operation Lagarto. They observed Sergeant Ellwood, who had been part of Lagarto, as being under guard. He had been missing for some time and was now obviously a captive. A rendezvous on 15–16 July 1945, using Krait, was unsuccessful. Ellwood and others were finally rescued, together with the Brim party by HDML 1324 on 5 August 1945.

On the night of 29–30 June 1945, Stevenson's party landed safely in an area close to the signalled drop zone and made preparations to observe any Japanese intervention and discovered Operation Lagarto had been compromised. Due to problems with their radio set, they were unable to contact Australian. In the meantime, Operation Suncob had been undertaken and its men were captured and killed.

== Aftermath ==
Dawson, Stevenson and Anjos had to survive pursuing Japanese for five weeks and were successfully rescued. However Dawson died of kidney failure on 10 August 1945 shortly after his return to Australia.
