= Fukuda, Nagasaki =

Fukuda 福田村
- Village (defunct)
- Interactive map of Fukuda
- Country: Japan
- Region: Kyushu
- Prefecture: Nagasaki Prefecture
- District: Nishisonogi
- Merged: 1 January 1955 (now part of Nagasaki)

Area
  - Total: 21.47 km^{2} (8.29 sq mi)

Population (January 1, 1955)
  - Total: 5,431
  - Density: 253.0/km^{2} (655.2/sq mi)
- Time zone: UTC+09:00 (JST)

Fukuda (福田村, Fukuda-mura) was a village in Nishisonogi District, Nagasaki Prefecture. It was absorbed into Nagasaki city in 1955.

In the 16th century it was the location of the Battle of Fukuda Bay, the first recorded naval battle between Western and Japanese forces. It also saw the spread of Christianity by Jesuit missionaries, who converted a large number of the local population into Kirishitans. During World War II the village suffered direct damage from the atomic bomb dropped on Nagasaki.

== History ==
=== Pre-Edo period ===
Fukuda village was within the Ōmura Domain, which had been controlled by the Ōmura clan since the 12th century. Fukuda Bay was opened to Portuguese traders in 1565 following negotiations with Ōmura Sumitada's chief vassal Fukuda Kanetsugu (福田兼次). The opening of Fukuda to the Portuguese took trade away from Hirado, a port controlled by the rival Matsura clan. On 18 October of that year the Battle of Fukuda Bay occurred, when a flotilla of Japanese ships led by Matsura Takanobu attacked a Portuguese carrack. This was the first recorded naval battle between European and Japanese forces. The Portuguese suffered eight fatalities in the battle that lasted two hours, while the attacking Japanese force lost 70 men with more than 200 injured.

Fukuda Kanetsugu was a Christian who welcomed the Portuguese traders. Between 1565 and 1570 Portuguese monks and priests were sent to Fukuda and churches were built. Ōmura visited the area from time to time and in 1566 it was reported that more than 1,000 Christians were living in Fukuda. However the bay's unfavourable location, being directly exposed to large waves from the open ocean, encouraged the Portuguese to look for a safer harbour. This led to the eventual opening of the Port of Nagasaki in 1571.

=== Edo period ===
The Edo-period surveyor Inō Tadataka described his visit to Fukuda in his diary entry for the 17th day of the 8th month in the 10th year of the Bunka era (11 September 1813 in the Gregorian calendar). Inō described the village as within the realm of the Omura clan.

=== Modern period ===
Under the Towns and Villages Law that came into effect on 1 April 1889, Fukuda was arranged into 9 neighbourhoods. In the atomic bombing of Nagasaki, five of the neighbourhoods in Fukuda received direct damage from the blast.

On 1 April 1950 a 0.06 km^{2} portion of the Ōura neighbourhood (consisting of 25 households and 106 residents) was transferred to neighbouring Nagasaki city. On 1 January 1955 Fukuda and a neighbouring village Fukahori were absorbed into Nagasaki city. At the time Fukuda's area was 21.47 km^{2} and the village was home to 5,431 residents living in 992 households. Fukuda now lies in the western region of Nagasaki. The western regional office of Nagasaki's city hall is based in the Fukuda branch.

== Bibliography ==
- Boxer, C. R. (1948). Fidalgos in the Far East, 1550–177. The Hague: Martinus Nijhoff.
