= Luís Fróis =

Portuguese missionary in Japan (1532–1597)

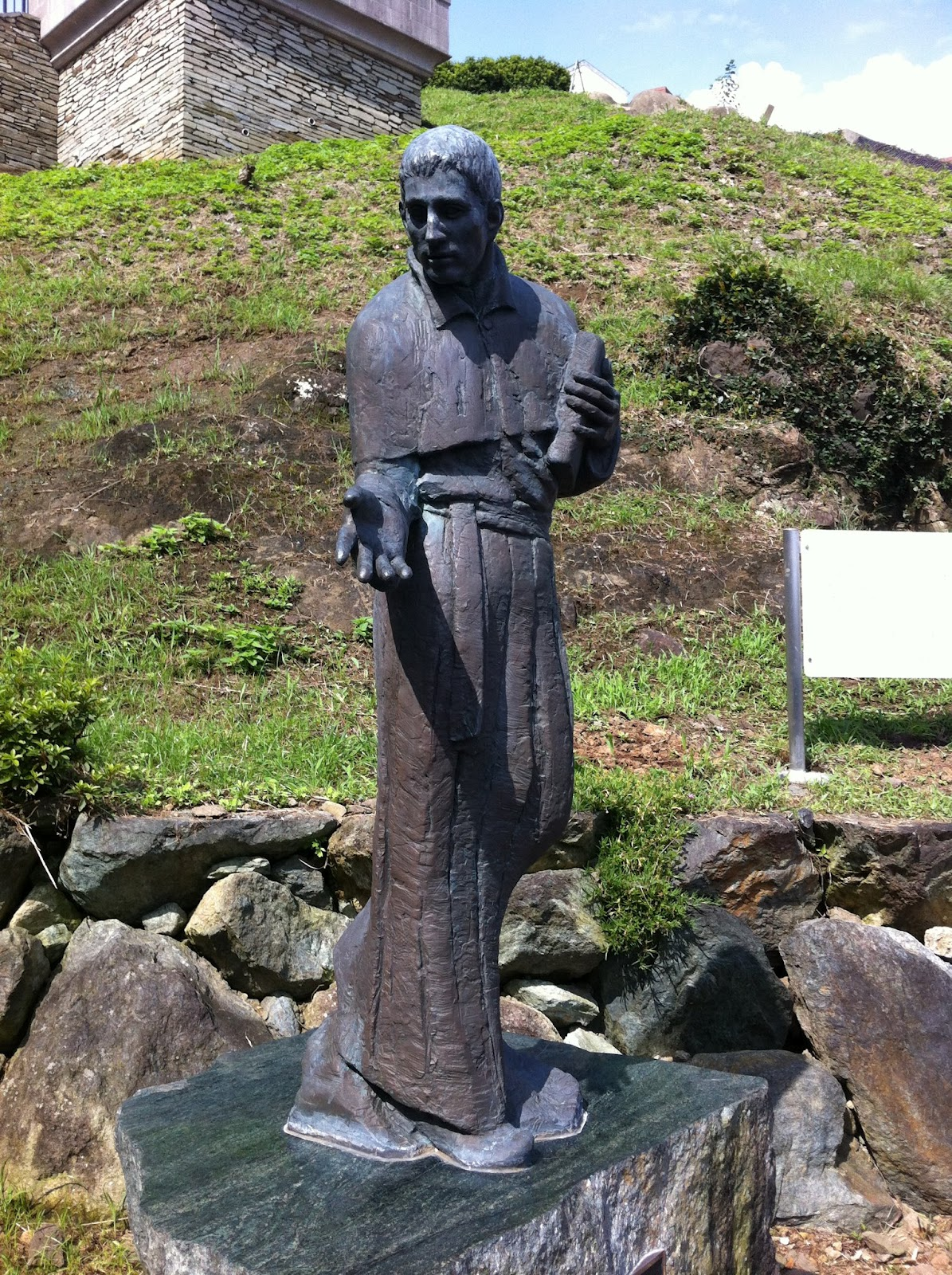
- Statue of Luís Frois, Nagasaki - Japan
- Born: 1532; Lisbon, Portugal
- Died: 8 July 1597 (aged 64–65); Nagasaki, Japan
- Occupations: Portuguese Missionary, writer

Signature
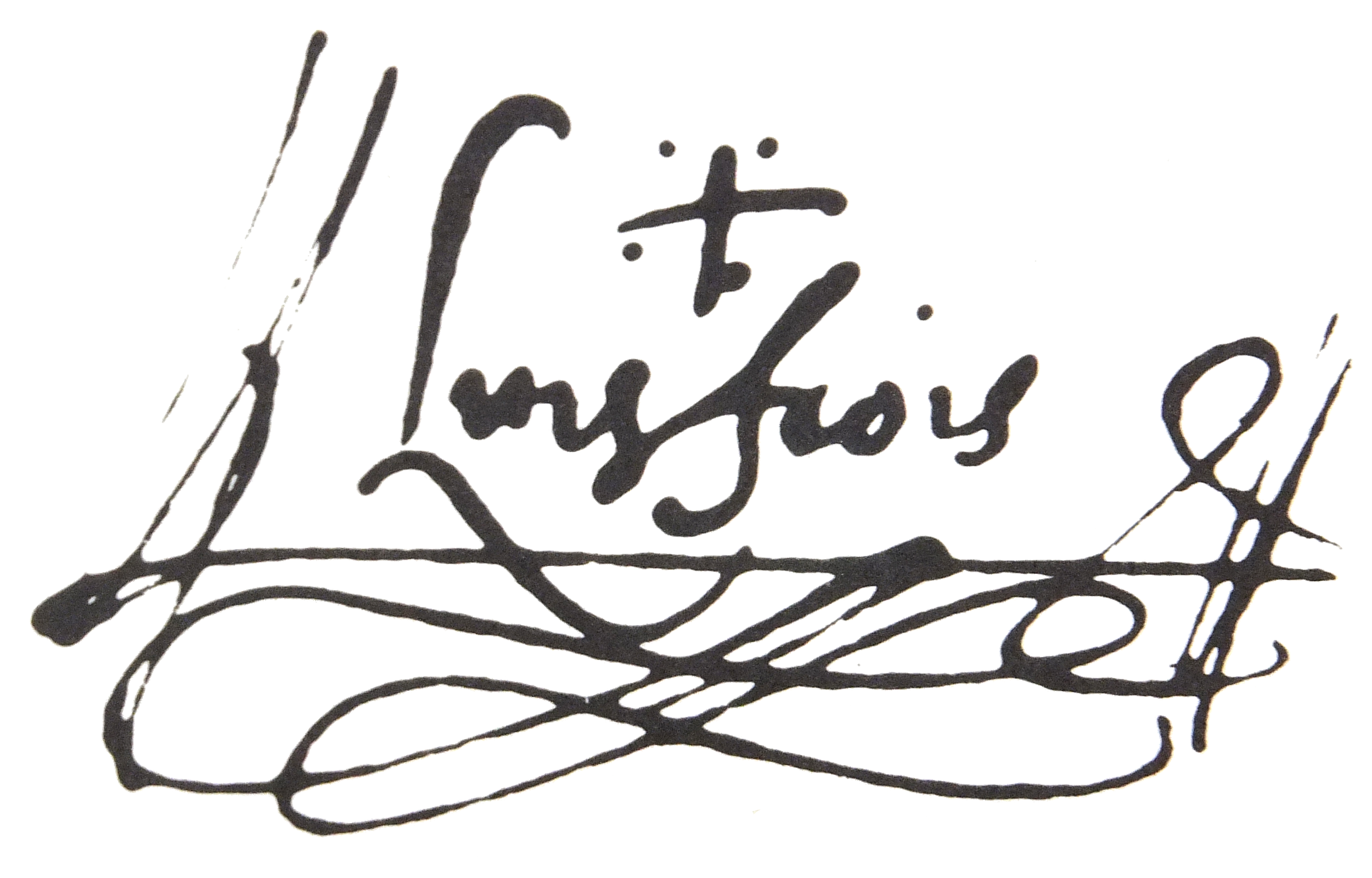

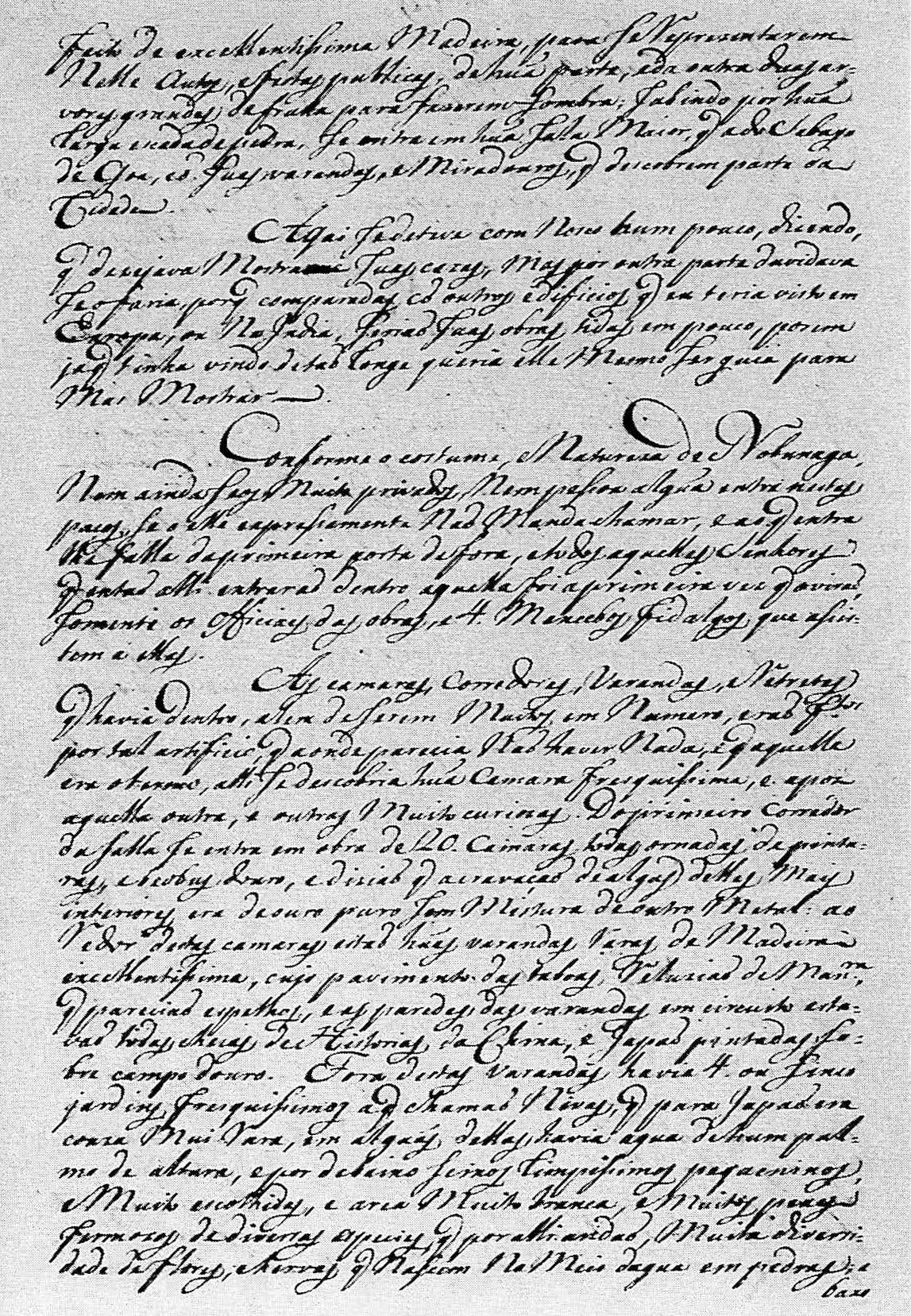
Historia de Iapam, manuscript page.

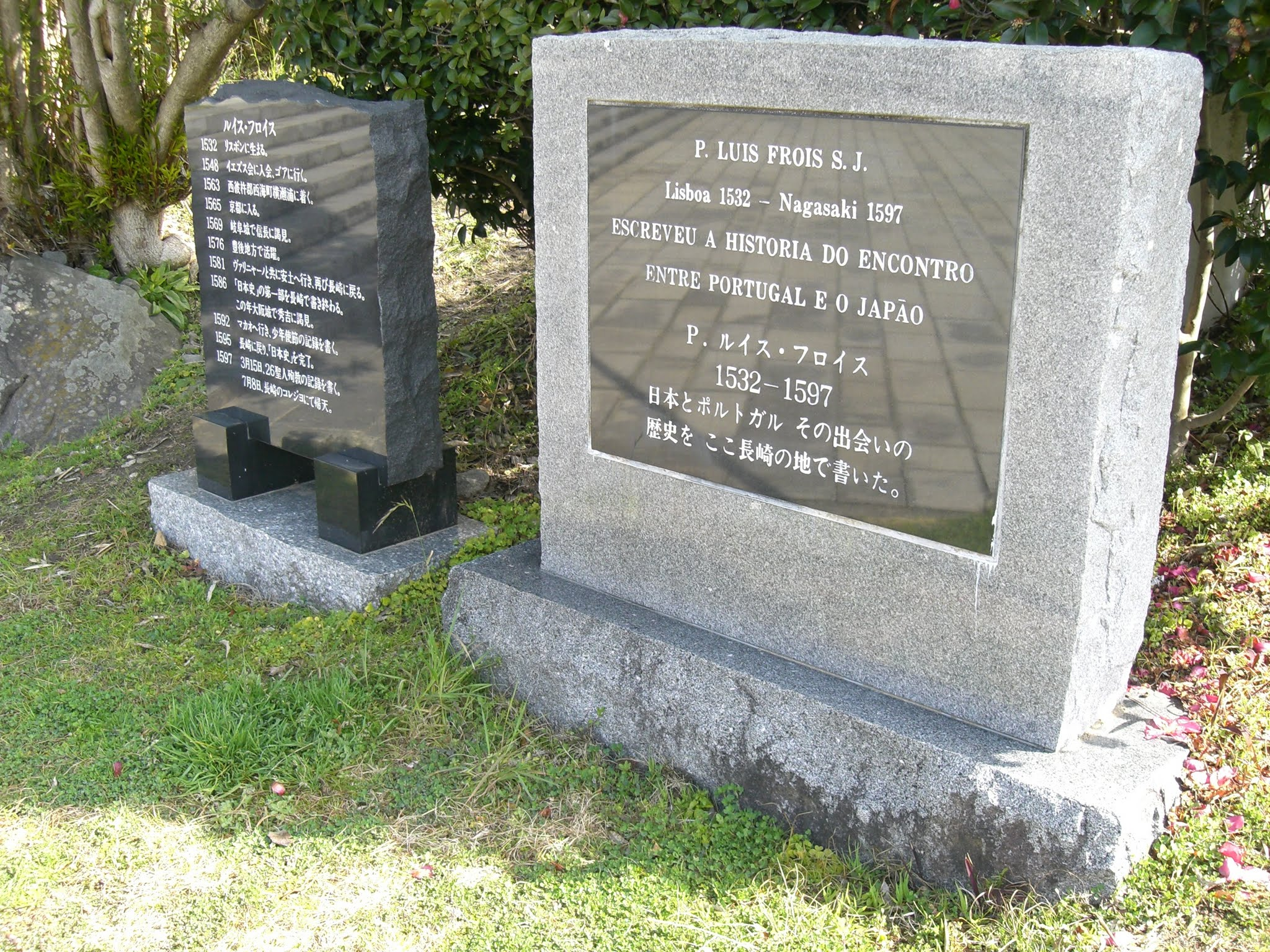
Plaque of Luís Fróis, Nagasaki - Japan

Luís Fróis (1532 – 8 July 1597) was a Portuguese Catholic priest and missionary who worked in Asia, most notably Japan, during the second half of the 16th century. As a Jesuit, he preached in Japan during the Sengoku period, meeting with Oda Nobunaga and Toyotomi Hideyoshi. He is famous for writing The First European Description of Japan and History of Japan.

== Biography ==
Fróis was born in Lisbon in 1532. He was educated at the court of King João III of Portugal, where a close relative served as a scribe. At an early age, he started working for the Royal Secretary's office. In 1548, he joined the Jesuits traveling to Portuguese India to study at Saint Paul's College, Goa. He arrived in Goa on 4 September 1548. One of his teachers described Fróis' character as tough and good natured but not religious. There he met Francis Xavier, who was about to depart for his mission to Japan, and his Japanese collaborator Anjirō.

During his stay in Goa, Fróis reported on the mass conversion of over 200 Kshatriyas to Christianity that had taken place on 25 August 1560 in the village of Batim, in a letter dated 13 November 1560:

"Mass baptisms in this village took place on 25 August 1560. The priests who had been sent to make preparations for the christening were asleep when at midnight of the 24th, more than 200 persons (men, women and children) knocked at their door and declared that they wished to become Christians. The women were very well dressed and wore plenty of gold. The men were also well dressed with feathers in their caps and guns on their shoulders. This group was led by one man named Camotim. He wore scarlet satin pants, had a silver sword at his waist and a gun on his shoulder. All of them were baptised on the above-mentioned day. These people belonged to the Chardo class, consisting of warriors, men of a much better personality than the Bamonns."

Fróis became a priest and confessor in 1561 after completing his theological studies in Goa, where his talents for languages and writing were highly praised. A year later, he was sent to Japan along with Giovanni Battista de Monte to engage in missionary work. On 6 June 1563, after spending several months in Macau, he arrived in Yokoseura, Japan. The following year, he travelled to Kyoto, where he met Ashikaga Yoshiteru who was then shōgun. In 1569, he befriended Oda Nobunaga and stayed in his personal residence in Gifu while writing books for a short while. Fróis won Nobunaga's trust and was allowed to proselytise in the Kinai region, where he worked together with Gnecchi-Soldo Organtino and others, gaining a large number of followers. In his writings, Nobunaga is portrayed favourably.

After that, he was active in Kyushu, but in 1580, he accompanied the visitor Alessandro Valignano as an interpreter on his visit to Japan, and had an audience with Nobunaga at Azuchi Castle. In 1583, he was ordered by the then Superior General to leave the front line of missionary work and devote himself to recording the activities of the Jesuits in Japan. From then on, Fróis devoted himself to this task, while also traveling around the country to spread his knowledge. This record would later be called the "History of Japan".

Initially, Toyotomi Hideyoshi continued Nobunaga's policy towards the Jesuits. However, this would change due to Hideyoshi's growing concerns regarding Christianity. Among others, these included its perceived threat to social stability and sporadic violence among converts against Buddhist and Shinto religious sites on territory controlled by Christian daimyō. On July 24, 1587, he issued an edict to expel the missionaries. Fróis left Kinai and settled in Nagasaki, which was under the control of Ōmura Sumitada.

In 1590, when Valignano returned to Japan with the Tenshō embassy to Europe, Fróis accompanied him and met with Hideyoshi at Jurakudai. In 1592, he traveled to Macau with Valignano for a time, but returned to Nagasaki in 1595. He died on 8 July 1597 in Nagasaki at the age of 65. Fróis witnessed firsthand the glory and tragedy, the progress and decline of Christian missionary work in Japan, and left behind valuable records of it.

== Publications ==
Noted early on for his talent in writing, Fróis wrote several books. His books have become valuable resources for research into the Sengoku period. His works on history were somewhat expanded by Joāo Rodrigues.

Among his works was the Treatise or The First European Description of Japan (1585) in which is contained some brief comparisons of the behaviors between the peoples of Europe and Japan (Tratado em que se contêm muito sucinta e abreviadamente algumas contradições e diferenças de costumes entre a gente de Europa e esta província de Japão).

Fróis wrote a book about the history and custom of Japan, titled Historia de Iapam ("History of Japan"). In it he gave details about the Jesuit mission in Japan and its most important figures. He described the destruction of Buddhist and Shinto temples as victories over the devil.

== Legacy ==
Luís Fróis has a monument at the Twenty-Six Martyrs Museum and Monument in Nagasaki.

== See also ==
- Francis Xavier
- Gaspar Vilela
- Francisco Cabral
- Alessandro Valignano
- List of Westerners who visited Japan before 1868
