= Manuel de Jesus Pires =

Portuguese military officer & civil servant

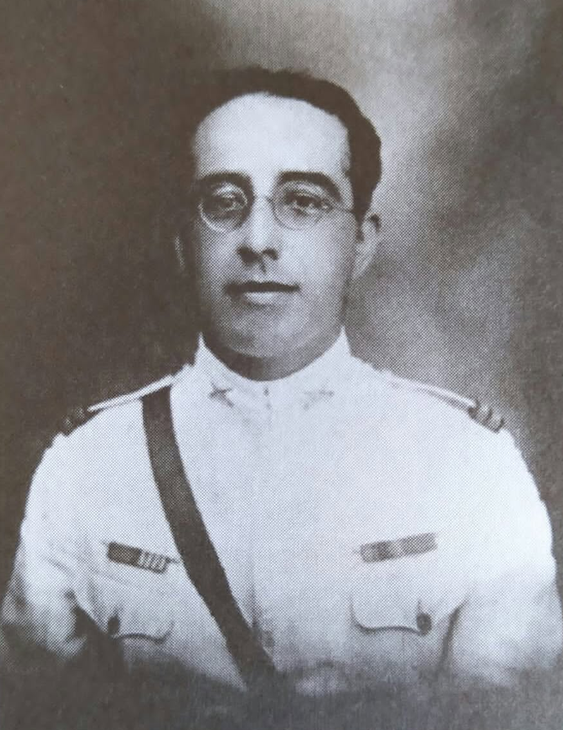
- Born: 6 March 1895; Porto, Portugal
- Died: 1944 (aged 48–49)
- Military career
- Allegiance: Portugal
- Branch: Portuguese Army
- Conflicts: World War I; World War II; Battle of Timor; Operation Lagarto (POW)
- Other work: Governor of Baucau

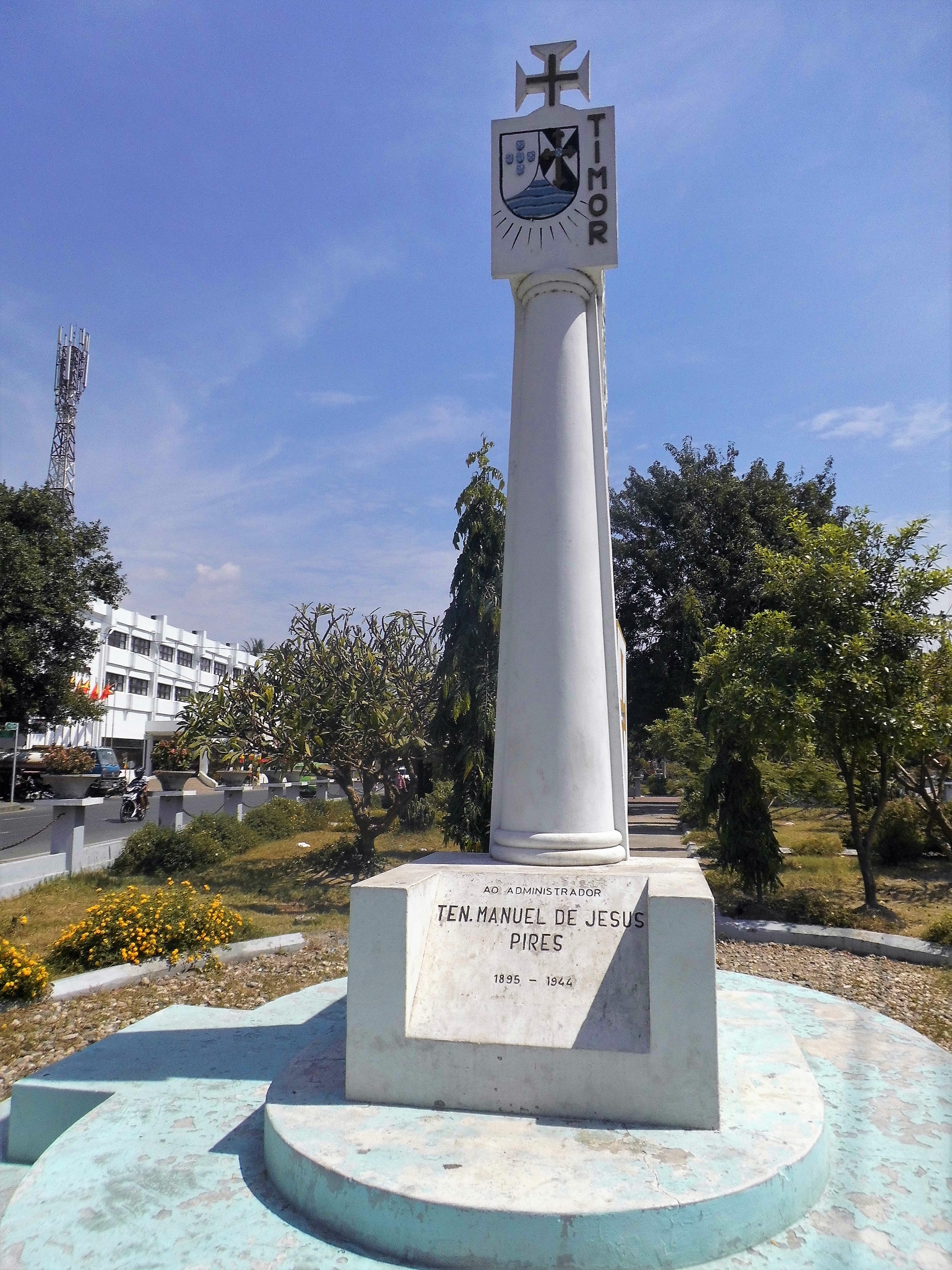
Monument dedicated to Manuel de Jesus Pires in Dili

Manuel de Jesus Pires (6 March 1895 – 1944) was a Portuguese military officer and civil servant who spent most of his life in Timor performing military service during World War II.

== Biography ==
Manuel de Jesus Pires was born in the city of Porto on March 6, 1895, he was the son of José Pires and Elisa de Jesus Pires. He studied at the Faculty of Sciences of Porto and the War School, and then joined the Portuguese Expeditionary Corps during World War I. In 1919, he was sent to Timor-Leste, where he spent the rest of his life. Over more than two decades, he held various military and civil positions, notably serving as the governor of Baucau from 1937.

When Japanese forces invaded Timor in 1942 in spite of Portugal's neutrality in World War II, Pires helped to evacuate groups of Portuguese and Timorese civilians. On 10 February 1943, as the last Allied soldiers were leaving the island, he boarded an American submarine, with the thought of gathering more help for Timor from the outside world than he could by staying on. Once in Australia, he spoke to Australian forces and contacted Prime Minister Salazar in Lisbon, calling for his intervention.

Unsuccessful in his attempts, Pires decided to go back to Timor. He was infiltrated back into the island in early July by Australian forces, along with three other Portuguese, and joined an undercover group. On 3 August, he organised the evacuation of 87 civilians. Pires was captured by Japanese soldiers on 29 September 1943 during Operation Lagarto. He died in detention at an unknown date, in 1944.

A monument was erected to him in Dili, in 1972.
