= Operation Cobra (Timor) =

Australian military operation in Timor

- Part of South West Pacific theatre of World War II
Date	27 January 1944
Location	Timor
Result	Japanese victory

Belligerents
Australia	Empire of Japan

Commanders and leaders
Captain Cashman (POW)	Unknown

Strength
5	Unknown

Casualties and losses
5 captured	Unknown

Operation Cobra was a military operation by Australia's Services Reconnaissance Department and Z Special Unit during World War II in Timor on 27 January 1944. A team of five soldiers were inserted on to Japanese occupied Timor.

It consisted of Captain Cashman, radio operator E.J. Liversidge, and three native Timorese, Sergeant Paulo da Silva, Sergeant Cosme Soares and Sergeant Sancho da Silva. They did not know the prior Operation Lagarto had been captured and compromised and the troops were captured.

The naval component of the campaign was known as Operation Bulldozer.

Liversidge died on 20 November 1944. Cashman survived.
