= Matsura Takanobu =

Japanese daimyo (1529–1599)

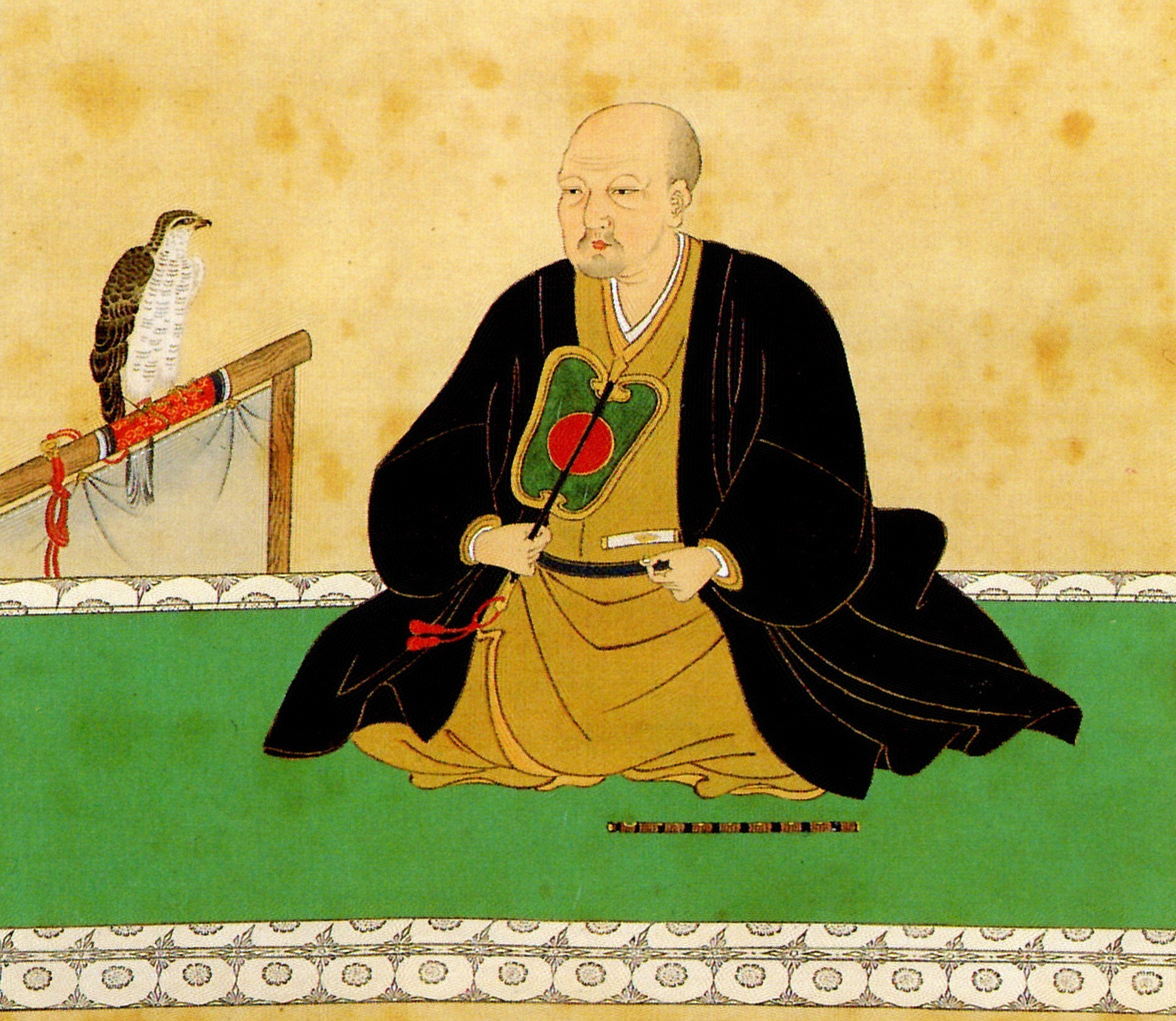

Daimyō of Hirado
- In office 1541–1568
- Preceded by: Matsura Okinobu
- Succeeded by: Matsura Shigenobu

Personal details
- Born: 1529
- Died: April 1, 1599 (aged 69–70)

Matsura Takanobu (松浦 隆信; 1529 – April 1, 1599) or Taqua Nombo was a 16th-century Japanese samurai and 25th hereditary lord of the Matsura clan of Hirado. He was one of the most powerful feudal lords of Kyūshū and one of the first to allow trading with Europeans, particularly the Portuguese, through whom he amassed great profits in the import of western firearms. He was also an early host and patron to the Jesuits, who he hoped would help secure an increase in trade with the Portuguese and other European traders.

== Biography ==
After becoming lord of Hirado in 1543, the 14-year-old Takanobu was advised by Yasumasa Toyohisa. Toyohisa was a well-known samurai and cousin of the previous lord of Hirado and, under his guidance, the domains of the Koteda family were increased to include much of Ikitsuki, together with the islands of Takushima, Ojika, Noshima as well as the areas of Kasuga, Shishi and Iira in Hirado. That same year he became an ally of the powerful wakō leader Wang Zhi, inviting him to live in Hirado and allowing his band to dominate the outlying islands off Kyūshū.

During the 1550s, he was involved in a fierce rivalry with the rival Ōmura clan, the Christian convert Ōmura Sumitada, who also competed for Portuguese trade. This led to many armed conflicts, including one attempt at taking the Portuguese black ship in the Battle of Fukuda Bay by Takanobu. This rivalry lasted for over three decades, and long after Takanobu had retired, until Ōmura eventually won out by ceding Nagasaki to the Jesuits in 1580, making it the Portuguese port of call henceforth.

Although initially tolerant to the Kirishitan movement introduced to Japan (Takanobu welcomed Francis Xavier to Hirado in 1550 and his retainer Koteda Yasumasa converted to Catholicism in 1551), he expelled the Jesuits from his domain in 1558. The evangelism of the Jesuits' followers resulted in the destruction of three Buddhist temples, who then threw artifacts into the sea. A speech given by a Zen priest from Yasumandake spoke out against Father Gaspar Vilela and resulted in several mobs of Buddhist followers stoning the three churches in the area and, in one instance, toppling the cross from one church. This recent surge in religious violence forced Takanobu to ask Vilela to leave. He later forced Kato Saemon, lord of the district of Kato, into retirement in Nagasaki due to pressure from his brothers.

In 1568, he stepped down in favor of his son Shigenobu. His great-grandson, baptized in 1591 and also named Matsura Takanobu, was the 3rd daimyō of Hirado Domain under the Tokugawa shogunate.

Matsura Takanobu died in 1599.

| Preceded by Matsura Okinobu | Daimyō of Hirado; 1541–1568 | Succeeded by Matsura Shigenobu |
