= Ōmura Sumitada =

Japanese daimyo

- 大村 純忠

Daimyō of Ōmura

Personal details
- Born: c. 1533 Nagasaki Prefecture, Japan
- Died: June 23, 1587
- Children: Dona Lucia
- Parent: Arima Haruzumi (father)
- Occupation: Samurai

Military service
- Battles/wars: Attacks on Nagasaki (1574–1579)

Ōmura Sumitada (大村 純忠; 1533 – June 23, 1587) was a Japanese daimyō lord of the Sengoku period. He became famous throughout the country for being the first of the daimyo to convert to Christianity following the arrival of the Jesuit missionaries in the mid-16th century. Following his baptism, he became known as "Dom Bartolomeu". Sumitada is also known as the lord who opened the port of Nagasaki to foreign trade.

== Early life ==
Ōmura Sumitada was born in 1533, the son of Arima Haruzumi, lord of Shimabara, and his wife, who was a daughter of Ōmura Sumiyoshi. His childhood name was Shōdōmaru 勝童丸. At age 5, he was adopted by his uncle Ōmura Sumisaki, and succeeded to the Ōmura family headship in 1550. As Sumisaki had no legitimate heirs, and the Ōmura clan had its origins in the family line of the Arima, Sumisaki readily adopted the young Shodomaru, who took the name Sumitada at the time of his succession.

== Career ==
Following his succession, he was immediately faced with a multitude of pressures, the greatest of which was the attack from Ryūzōji Takanobu of Hizen-Saga. Sumitada found the answer to his problems in the form of Christianity. In 1561, following the murder of foreigners in Hirado (in the area of influence of the Matsura clan), the Portuguese began to look for other ports where they could trade.

In response to their search, Sumitada offered them safe haven in his domain, at Yokoseura. This cast a great impression on the Portuguese, and particularly on the Society of Jesus (the Jesuits). This they readily agreed to, and soon after, in 1563, Sumitada and his retainers became Christian, and Sumitada took the baptismal name Bartolomeu.

After his conversion Sumitada, under the influence of the Jesuits, ordered the razing of Buddhist temples and Shinto shrines. Sumitada's subjects were forced to convert or be exiled from the domain. Jesuit Gaspar Coelho helped to encourage the destruction of temples and the persecution of non-Christians. The destruction and persecutions were committed due to Sumitada's religious zeal and the Jesuits' insistence that the destruction of the temples and shrines would be the most appropriate way to repay them as the Portuguese helped protect him and his domain. The Jesuits also believed that the firm planting of Christianity would require the institutional and iconographic elimination of local religions.

Sumitada likely pursued Christianity to profit from Portuguese technology and weapons as the Sengoku period was one of political fragmentation and uncertainty. However, after his baptism, Sumitada expressed more interest and genuine devotion to his new faith.

To illustrate Sumitada's devotion to Christianity, the Portuguese Jesuit father Luís Fróis had once wrote:

"As Omura Sumitada had gone off to the wars, it so happened that he passed on the way an idol, Marishiten by name, which is their god of battles. When they pass it, they bow and pay reverence to it, and the pagans who are on horseback dismount as a sign of their respect. Now the idol had above it a cockerel. As the daimyo came there with his squadron he had his men stop and ordered them to take the idol and burn it together with the whole temple; and he took the cockerel and gave it a blow with the sword, saying to it, "Oh, how many times have you betrayed me!" And after everything had been burnt down, he had a very beautiful cross erected on the same spot, and after he and his men had paid very deep reverence to it, they continued on their way to the wars."

== Opening Nagasaki ==
Goto Takaakira, an illegitimate son of Ōmura Sumisaki who hated Sumitada, led an uprising against him. During the chaos, Yokoseura was burned, ending the foreign trade there. As a result, in 1570, Sumitada opened the port of Nagasaki to the Portuguese and sponsored its development. When the Ryūzōji attacked Nagasaki in 1578, the Portuguese assisted Sumitada in repulsing them. Following this event, on June 9, 1580, Sumitada ceded Nagasaki "in perpetuity" to the Society of Jesus.

Following Toyotomi Hideyoshi's campaign against the Shimazu clan, the Ōmura were confirmed in their holdings, though Nagasaki was taken from the Jesuits and made into a chokkatsu-ryo, or direct landholding, of the Toyotomi administration.

== Later life ==
Sumitada handed over domainal administration to his son Omura Yoshiaki and retired, living in a mansion at Sakaguchi. He died there of tuberculosis, on June 23, 1587. Ōtomo Sōrin, another Christian daimyō, died within the same month. This was also the year when Toyotomi Hideyoshi banned Christianity in Japan.
