= List of samurai =

The following is a list of Samurai and their wives. They are listed alphabetically by name. Some have used multiple names, and are listed by their final name. Note that this list is not complete or comprehensive; the total number of persons who belonged to the samurai-class of Japanese society, during the time that such a social category existed, would be in the millions.

== Samurai ==
=== A ===
- Abe Masakatsu
- Adachi Kagemori
- Adams, William
- Akai Terukage
- Akao Kiyotsuna
- Akechi Mitsuhide
- Akiyama Nobutomo
- Amago Haruhisa
- Amago Yoshihisa
  - See also Amago clan
- Andō Morinari
- Ankokuji Ekei
- Aochi Shigetsuna
- Arai Hakuseki
- Araki Murashige
- Arima Kihei
- Asakura Yoshikage
- Ashikaga Takauji
- Ashikaga Yoshiaki
- Ashikaga Yoshiteru
- Azai Hisamasa
- Azai Nagamasa
- Azai Sukemasa

=== B ===
- Baba Nobufusa
- Bessho Nagaharu

=== C ===
- Chacha
- Chiba Shusaku Narimasa
- Chōsokabe Morichika
- Chōsokabe Kunichika
- Chōsokabe Motochika
- Chōsokabe Nobuchika

=== D ===
- Date Masamune
- Date Shigezane
  - See also Date clan
- Doi Toshikatsu

=== E ===
- Etō Shinpei
- Endō Naotsune
- Enomoto Takeaki

=== F ===
- Fujibayashi Nagato-no-kami (samurai and ninja)
- Fūma Kotarō (ninja)
- Fuwa Mitsuharu
- Fukushima Masanori

=== G ===
- Gamō Katahide
- Gamō Ujisato

=== H ===
- Harada Nobutane
- Harada Sanosuke
- Harukichi Shimoi
- Hasekura Tsunenaga
- Hattori Hanzō (ninja)
- Hatano Hideharu
- Hayashi Narinaga
- Hijikata Toshizo
- Hirate Masahide
- Hitotsubashi Keiki
- Hōjō Masako
- Hōjō Tokimune
- Hōjō Ujiyasu
- Hōjō Ujimasa
- Honda Tadakatsu
- Honda Tadamasa
- Honda Tadatomo
- Honganji Kennyo
- Horio Yoshiharu
- Hosokawa Fujitaka
- Hosokawa Gracia
- Hosokawa Tadaoki
- Hotta Masatoshi

=== I ===
- Ibuka Kajinosuke
- Ii Naomasa
- Ii Naomori
- Ii Naosuke
- Ii Naotaka
- Ii Naotora
- Ii Naoyuki
- Iizasa Ienao
- Ijuin Tadaaki
- Ikeda Tsuneoki
- Imagawa Ujizane
- Imagawa Yoshimoto
- Imai Kanehira
- Inaba Yoshimichi
- Inugami Nagayasu
- Ishida Mitsunari
- Itagaki Nobukata
- Itō Hirobumi
- Iwanari Tomomichi

=== K ===
- Kakeda Toshimune
- Kaneko Ietada
- Katagiri Katsumoto
- Katakura Kojūro
- Katakura Shigenaga
- Katō Kiyomasa
- Kawakami Gensai
- Kido Takayoshi
- Kikkawa Hiroie
- Kimotsuki Kanetsugu
- Kobayakawa Hideaki
- Kobayakawa Hidekane
- Kobayakawa Takakage
- Konishi Yukinaga
- Kojima Toyoharu
- Kuroda Kanbei
- Kuroda Kiyotaka
- Kusunoki Masashige
- Kumagai Naozane

=== M ===
- Maeda Keiji
- Maeda Matsu
- Maeda Nagatane
- Maeda Toshiie
- Maeda Toshinaga
- Maeda Toshitsune
- Manabe Akifusa
- Matsudaira Katamori (7th son of Yoshitatsu)
- Matsudaira Nobutsuna
- Matsudaira Nobuyasu
- Matsudaira Higo no Kami Katamori
- Matsudaira Sadanobu
- Matsudaira Tadayoshi
- Matsudaira Teru
- Matsunaga Hisahide
- Matsuo Bashō
- Matsudaira Motoyasu
- Minamoto no Mitsunaka
- Minamoto no Yoshiie
- Minamoto no Yoshimitsu
- Minamoto no Yoshinaka
- Minamoto no Yoshitomo
- Minamoto no Yoshitsune
- Minamoto no Tameyoshi
- Minamoto no Yorimasa
- Minamoto no Yorimitsu
- Minamoto no Yoritomo
- Minamoto no Noriyori
- Miura Anjin
- Miura Yoshimoto
- Miyamoto Musashi
- Miyoshi Chōkei
- Miyoshi Yoshitsugu
- Mizuno Tadakuni
- Mōri Motonari
- Mori Nagayoshi
- Mōri Okimoto
- Mori Ranmaru
- Mōri Takamoto
- Mōri Terumoto
- Mori Yoshinari
- Murai Sadakatsu

=== N ===
- Nagakura Shinpachi
- Nagao Harukage
- Nagao Masakage
- Nagao Tamekage
- Nakagawa Kiyohide
- Nakaoka Shintarō
- Naoe Kagetsuna
- Naoe Kanetsugu
- Narita Kaihime
- Nene
- Nihonmatsu Yoshitsugu
- Niimi Nishiki
- Niiro Tadamoto
- Niwa Nagahide
- Niwa Nagashige

=== O ===
- Oda Nobuhide
- Oda Nobunaga
- Oda Nobutada
- Oda Nobutomo
- Oda Nobukatsu
- Ogasawara Shōsai
- Ōishi Kuranosuke
- Okada Izō
- Judge Ooka
- Ōta Dōkan
- Ōtani Yoshitsugu
- Ōtomo Sōrin
- Okita Sōji
- Ōkubo Toshimichi
- Ōuchi Yoshitaka

=== R ===
- Rokkaku Yoshikata
- Rusu Masakage
- Ryūzōji Takanobu
  - See also Ryūzōji clan

=== S ===
- Saigo Kiyokazu
- Saigō Masako
- Sagara Taketō
- Saigō Takamori
- Saigo Yoshikatsu
- Saitō Dōsan
- Saitō Hajime
- Saito Musashibō Benkei
- Saitō Yoshitatsu
- Sakai Tadakiyo
- Sakai Tadashige
- Sakai Tadatsugu
- Sakai Tadayo
- Sakakibara Yasumasa
- Sakamoto Ryōma
- Sakuma Morimasa
- Sakuma Nobumori
- Sanada Akihime
- Sanada Komatsuhime
- Sanada Masayuki
- Sanada Nobuyuki
- Sanada Yukimura
  - See also Sanada clan
- Sasaki Kojirō
- Sassa Narimasa
- Sasuke Sarutobi
- Serizawa Kamo
- Shibata Katsuie
- Shima Sakon
- Shimada Ichirō
- Shimazu Katsuhisa
- Shimazu Tadahisa
- Shimazu Tadatsune
- Shimazu Tadayoshi
- Shimazu Takahisa
- Shimazu Toyohisa
- Shimazu Yoshihiro
- Shimazu Yoshihisa
  - See also Shimazu clan
- Sue Yoshitaka

=== T ===
- Tachibana Muneshige
- Tachibana Dōsetsu
- Tachibana Ginchiyo
- Taigen Sessai
- Taira no Kiyomori
- Taira Masakado
- Takahashi Shigetane
- Takenaka Shigeharu
- Takasugi Shinsaku
- Takayama Justo (Shigetomo)
- Takayama Ukon
- Takechi Hanpeita
- Takeda Katsuyori
- Takeda Nobushige
- Takeda Shingen
- Takenaka Hanbei
- Tōdō Takatora
- Toki Yorinari
- Tokugawa Ieyasu
- Tokugawa Hidetada
- Tokugawa Iemitsu
- Tokugawa Ietsuna
- Tokugawa Tsunayoshi
- Tokugawa Ienobu
- Tokugawa Yoshimune
- Tokugawa Ienari
- Tokugawa Iesada
- Tokugawa Nariaki
- Tokugawa Iemochi
- Tokugawa Yoshinobu
- Torii Mototada
- Toyotomi Hidenaga
- Toyotomi Hideyoshi
- Toyotomi Hideyori
- Tozuka Tadaharu
- Tsukahara Bokuden

=== U ===
- Uesugi Kagekatsu
- Uesugi Kagetora
- Uesugi Kenshin
- Ujiie Naotomo
- Ukita Naoie
- Umezawa Michiharu
- Usami Sadamitsu

=== W ===
- Watanabe Kazan
- Watanabe no Tsuna

=== Y ===
- Yasuke
- Yagyū Jūbei Mitsuyoshi
- Yagyū Munenori
- Yamauchi Kazutoyo
- Yamada Arinobu
- Yamada Nagamasa
- Yamagata Masakage
- Yamakawa Hiroshi
- Yamakawa Kenjirō
- Yamanaka Yukimori
- Yamanami Keisuke
- Yamaoka Tesshū
- Yanagisawa Yoshiyasu
- Yonekura Shigetsugu
- Yūki Hideyasu

== See also ==
Media related to Samurai by name at Wikimedia Commons

- Ashikaga shogunate
- Kamakura shogunate
- Tokugawa shogunate
- Japanese clans
