= Akizuki Tanezane =

Samurai warrior

- 秋月 種実

Head of Akizuki clan
- In office 1564–1596
- Preceded by: Akizuki Fumitane
- Succeeded by: Akizuki Tanenaga

Personal details
- Born: 1548
- Died: November 16, 1596 (aged 47–48)
- Children: Akizuki Tanenaga
- Parent: Akizuki Fumitane (father)

Military service
- Allegiance: Akizuki clan Mōri clan Shimazu clan Toyotomi clan
- Rank: Daimyō
- Commands: Oguma Castle
- Battles/wars: Battle of Yasumimatsu (1567); Siege of Iwaya Castle (1585); Siege of Tachibana castle (1586); Kyushu Campaign (1587)

Akizuki Tanezane (秋月 種実; 1548 – November 16, 1596) was a samurai warrior and daimyo in 16th century Japan. He was a member of the Akizuki clan from Chikuzen Province, and was the son of Akizuki Fumitane; his father was defeated by the Ōtomo clan in 1564.

== Biography ==
Following his father's death in 1564 at the hands of the Ōtomo clan, Akizuki Tanezane, then aged about 16, sought assistance from the Mōri clan. After the defeat of the Mōri in northern Kyushu at the hands of the Ōtomo, he turned to the Shimazu clan for assistance. In 1567, Tanezane managed to recapture the castle of Mount Kosho from the Ōtomo clan and made clear his intention to fight against them. In response, the Ōtomo leader Sorin sent Tachibana Dōsetsu, Usuki Akisumi, and Yoshihiro Akimasa with 20,000 soldiers on August 14 to punish Tanezane. The Ōtomo army first engaged Akizuki's forces at the Battle of Amamizu and Haseyama (also known as the Battle of Uryuno) on August 14, and on the 15th the Ōtomo had captured Ojo, a branch castle of Yasumimatsu Castle. This caused the commander of the castle, Moromasa Sakata, to commit suicide.

Dōsetsu then stationed his army around Yasumimatsu castle, in preparation to capture Mount Kosho Castle. However, the castle was defended firmly and a siege ensued. Subsequently, rumors circulated that a huge Mōri clan army in the Chugoku region planned to invade Ojo, which prompted the Ōtomo forces to withdraw from Mount Kosho. They abandoned Yasumimatsu castle and began retreating on the morning of September 3. In response, Tanezane decided to pursue the withdrawing Ōtomo army by dividing his 12,000 troops into four groups under the command of Kankage Intosho, Sanehisa Uchida Zenbei, and Ayabe Suruga no Kami. Dōsetsu already anticipated this movement by leading a rearguard with 3,000 soldiers with the assistance of his lieutenants, Bekki Shigetsura, Ono Shizuyuki, and Korenobu Yufu, with each of them leading 500-600 cavalry.

During this attack, the assault forces of Tanezane managed to inflict losses as they killed one of Dōsetsu's most trusted generals, Koretada Totoki. However, the rearguard detachment of Dōsetsu managed to reverse the situation and inflicted heavy losses upon Tanezane troops, forcing them to retreat. Later at night, Tanezane once again launched an assault this time with 4,000 soldiers in a night raid. The unexpected night attack by the Akizuki forces threw the Ōtomo army into chaos, and they suffered heavy losses with the total number of casualties being over 400, throwing the latter's force into panic. Dōsetsu managed to return order among his troops and organize a retreat, but Tanezane ordered his troops to pursue the fleeing Dōsetsu further. They continued to pursue them as far as Chikugo Yamakuma Castle, forcing the Ōtomo army to suffer even more casualties. Many of Dōsetsu's clansmen were killed in this battle, such as Bekki Akitaka, Bekki Chikashige, Bekki Chikamune.

In the autumn of 1569, Dōsetsu captured the Yamakuma Castle from Tanezane.

In 1578 on December 11–13, Tanezane worked together with Tsukushi Hirokado and Ryūzōji Takanobu to invade Chikuzen, while Dōsetsu and his army worked hard to defend those territories.

In 1579 of mid January, Dōsetsu participated in the second Ōtomo invasion of Tsukushi province and Dazaifu town against the Akizuki clan, forcing Akizuki Tanezane to abandon his siege of Takatoriyama Castle. After that, Dōsetsu besieged the Iwaya castle for the second time. In March, Dōsetsu besieged the Iwaya castle for the third time subsequently with some clashes against the forces of Akizuki Tanezane. Following that, Dōsetsu engaged against Akizuki clan forces in the battle of Yatake, Chikuzen province. In July 27, Dōsetsu repulsed a joint attack from Tanezane and Harada Nobutane.

In 1580, from November 3 until December, Dōsetsu fought against the forces of Akizuki Tanezane and Munakata Ujisada respectively.

In 1581, Dōsetsu participated in the several engagements against Akizuki Tanezane. First, Dōsetsu fought against Tanezane and Ujisada in the battle of Koganebara, which was recorded in history as the largest military engagement ever to happen in Kurate until at that time. In this battle, Dōsetsu inflicted a crushing defeat on his enemies, which left the territories under the control of Ujisada vulnerable to further incursions by Dōsetsu's army. Later, Dōsetsu fought against Tanezane again in Shimizuhara, and Takatori castle. In July 27, Dōsetsu and Shigetane Shigetane fought against Tsukushi Hirokado and Akizuki Tanezane in the second battle of Dazaifu Kanzeon-ji. It is in this battle that, Takahashi Munetora, who would be known as Tachibana Muneshige, saw his first notable action.

On April 16, 1582, during the Battle of Iwato against the combined forces of 2,000 from the Akizuki, Harada, and Munakata clans, Dōsetsu led a 500-strong ambush force and surrounded his 1,000-strong main force. 300 of Muneshige's troops launched a surprise attack from the side with guns, while the remaining 200 soldiers were led by Komono Masutoki, who set up a false flag to make it look like reinforcements from the Otomo clan were coming, and finally managed to lift the siege. Muneshige then led 1,000 cavalry including Komono Masutoki, Korenobu Yufu, and Shigeyuki Ono, eliminating 300 of the Harada general's troops, Kasa Okinaga, who had built a fort at Iwatosho Kubeno, killing 150 of them, and pursuing them west to Sawara County, where he burned down Harada Chikahide's Sawara Castle. On November 6, Dōsetsu marched to Kama and Honami along with Muneshige and Shigetane. While on their way to the rescue of Kutami Akiyasu, the Tachibana and Takahashi forces received information that Akiyasu had safely retreated after fighting Akizuki Tanezane and Monjūjo Munekage (the great-uncle of Munekage) in the Battle of Haratsuru, so they retreated. However, Tanezane's forces turned out to still be pursuing them. Both fierce battles resulted in over 1,000 casualties, including over 300 casualties from Tachibana and Takahashi, and 760 for the Akizuki clan. (Note: ^ The Tachibana side referred to this battle as the Battle of Junnohara (also called the Third Battle of Kama and Honami, the Battle of Junnohara, or the Second Battle of Yagiyama-Ishizaka (a battle that took place at the Dainichi-ji entrance on the Yagiyama Ishizaka road in Honami County, a different battle from the Second Battle of Dazaifu Kanzeonji and the Second Battle of Dazaifu Ishizaka in Ishizaka, Dazaifu City on July 27 of the same year)), while the Akizuki side referred to it as the Battle of Yagiyama.)

In 1585, Tanezane supported the Shimazu in an offensive against the Ōtomo at the Siege of Iwaya Castle. Later, Tanezane participated in anti-Ōtomo alliance invasion led by Ryūzōji Ieharu. With a total army of 30,000, the alliance attacked Kurume. The Ōtomo forces led by Tachibana Dōsetsu and Takahashi Shigetane manage to score a series of victories over the numerically superior allied focers with a combination of brilliant maneuvers and tactics in three separate battles: in the end, the alliance siege against the town failed.

In 1586, he and Shimazu Yoshihisa marched to attack Ōtomo's Tachibana castle.

In 1587, he fought with Shimazu against Toyotomi Hideyoshi in Kyūshū, an island of Japan.

In 1596, Tanezane was succeeded by his son Tanenaga. After the Battle of Sekigahara, Tanenaga was transferred to Takanabe han (in Hyuga, 20,000 koku).

== Appendix ==
=== Bibliography ===
- 吉永 正春 (2009). 筑前戦国史 増補改訂版 (in Japanese). 海鳥. ASIN 4874157394.
- Nakano Anai (2012). 中野等、穴井綾香 著、柳川市史編集委員会 編『柳川の歴史4 (in Japanese). 柳川市. p. 21~2.
- Hall, John W.; Hall, John Whitney; Brown, Delmer M.; McClain, James L.; McCullough, William H.; Jansen, Marius B.; Shively, Donald Howard; Kanai, Madoka; Yamamura, Kozo (1988). The Cambridge History of Japan. New York, NY: Cambridge University Press. p. 341. ISBN 978-0-521-22355-3.
- Kuwata, Kazuaki (2016). 戦国時代の筑前国宗像氏 [Munakata clan of Chikuzen Province during the Sengoku period]. 図書出版 花乱社. ISBN 978-4-905327-60-8.
- Masato Fujino (2011). "城郭から見た宗像の戦国時代" [Munakata's Warring States Period seen from the castle]. むなかた電子博物館紀要 第３号 (in Japanese). 5: 豊前覚書 /Buzen Memorandum. Munakata Digital Musium.
- Yano Kazutada (1926). 筑後国史 : 原名・筑後将士軍談 上巻 (in Japanese). 筑後遺籍刊行会. p. 190.
- Kazutada, Yano (1926). 『筑後将士軍談』 卷之第十四 高橋紹運取返米山付統虎初陣石垣山合戦 ["Military Tales of the Chikugo Shoguns" Volume 14: Takahashi Shouun's Return to Yoneyama and Tora's First Battle at Ishigakiyama] (in Japanese). 筑後遺籍刊行会.
- Yoshiaki Kusudo (2009). 戦国名将・智将・梟将の至言. 学研M文庫. 学習研究社. ISBN 978-4-05-901239-9. Archived from the original on 2024-05-20.
- Yoshinaga, Masaharu (1977). 筑前戦国史 [Chikuzen Sengoku History]. 葦書房.ASIN B000J8REN4
- Yoshinaga Masaharu (2009). 筑前戦国史 [Chikuzen Sengoku History] (in Japanese). 海鳥. ISBN 9784874157398.
- Banri Hoashi (1835). 国書データベース: 井樓纂聞 梅岳公遺事 [Kokusho Sōmokuroku: Seirousanbun: The Iji of Lord Baigaku] (in Japanese). Niigata University Library.
