= Akizuki =

The Japanese name Akizuki may refer to:

- Akizuki clan, a Japanese noble family
- Akizuki (surname)
- Akizuki rebellion, in 1876
- Akizuki-class destroyer, several classes of Japanese warships
- Japanese destroyer Akizuki, several Japanese ships
