= Akizuki (surname) =

Akizuki (秋月) is a Japanese surname. Notable people with the surname include:

- Akizuki clan (秋月氏), Japanese noble family
- Risu Akizuki (秋月 りす; born 1957), Japanese manga artist
- Akizuki Satsuo (秋月 左都夫; 1858–1945), Japanese diplomat
- Akizuki Tanezane (秋月 種実; 1548–1596), Japanese samurai warrior
- Akizuki Teijirō (秋月 悌次郎; 1824–1900), Japanese samurai
- Yasuo Akizuki (秋月 康夫; 1902–1984), Japanese mathematician
