= Siege of Iwaya Castle =

1586 Shimazu siege

- Part of Sengoku period
Date	1585
Location	Iwaya Castle, Chikuzen Province 33°31′33″N 130°31′13″E
Result	Shimazu victory

Belligerents
Forces of Shimazu Yoshihisa	Forces of Takahashi Shigetane and Ōtomo clan

Commanders and leaders
Shimazu Yoshihisa; Shimazu Yoshihiro; Shimazu Toshihisa; Shimazu Tadanaga; Yamada Arinobu; Akizuki Tanezane	Takahashi Shigetane †

Strength
20,000-50,000 (Various estimates)	763

Casualties and losses
Over 4,500 killed or wounded	All 763 killed
- Location within Fukuoka Prefecture Siege of Iwaya Castle (Japan)

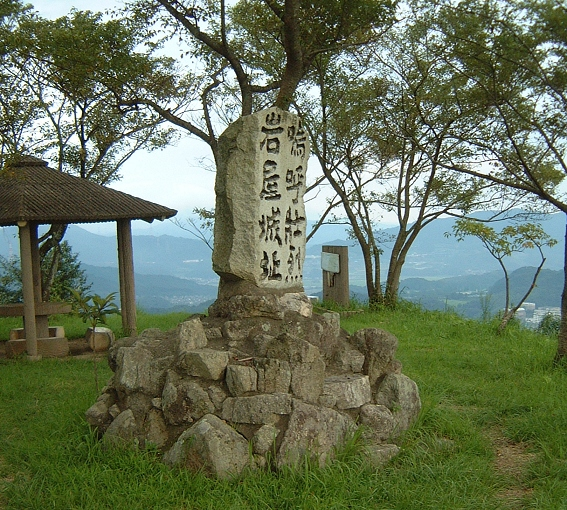
Monument at the castle

The siege of Iwaya Castle (岩屋城の戦い) was fought in the 7th month of Tenshō 14 (1586) when an army of the Shimazu clan put the castle of Iwaya, which belonged to the Takahashi clan who were vassals of the Ōtomo clan, under fierce siege.

In Tenshō 12 (1584), after defeating the Ryūzōji clan and killing Ryūzōji Takanobu at the Battle of Okitanawate, the Shimazu clan under the leadership of Shimazu Yoshihisa greatly expanded their authority, refocusing their attention on the Ōtomo clan and starting a campaign against their dominions. Driven by various motives including defecting from the Ryūzōji clan or opposing the Ōtomo clan, smaller regional powers including Kumabe Chikanaga and his son Chikayasu of Higo Province, Akizuki Tanezane of Chikuzen Province, and Tsukushi Hirokado of eastern Hizen Province strengthened their ties with the Shimazu clan through submission or peace treaties.

After the Shimazu subjugated Aso Koremitsu of Higo Province the following year, the Ōtomo clan remained the sole obstacle blocking the Shimazu clan's ambitions of conquering the rest of Kyūshū.

Shimazu Yoshihisa continued, as head of the Shimazu clan, to dispatch over 20,000 men under the command of Shimazu Tadanaga and Ijūin Tadamune into Chikuzen Province. They first defeated Tsukushi Hirokado at Katsuo Castle, who had defected to the Ōtomo clan's side just before the campaign had begun. The only remaining Ōtomo retainers still resisting the Shimazu clan were Takahashi Shōun at Iwaya Castle, Takahashi Shōun's eldest son Tachibana Muneshige at Tachibanayama Castle, and Takahashi Shōun's second son Takahashi Munemasu (later known as Tachibana Naotsugu) at Hōmanzan Castle.

The garrison of 763 soldiers barricaded themselves inside Iwaya Castle. On the 12th day of the 7th month of Tenshō 14 (1586), the Shimazu clan's army issued a call to surrender, but Takahashi Shōun refused and started an all-out resistance. On the 14th day of the 7th month, the Shimazu assault on Iwaya Castle commenced with an estimated 50,000 troops; however, the majority of the Shimazu army consisted of levies from other provinces (takokushū) who lacked the morale to fight. Under the lead of Takahashi Shōun, the Shimazu forces were repelled and suffered major casualties. With the siege going poorly, the Shimazu side offered peace in exchange for Shōun's biological son as a hostage, which Shōun refused as well.

On the 27th day, half a month after the siege had begun, Shimazu Tadanaga personally took command of the troops and launched an assault on the castle. After suffering heavy casualties the Shimazu forces breached the castle up to the final inner bailey where Shōun was holding out. Shōun climbed to the highest turret and committed seppuku. All 763 soldiers in the garrison either died or took their own lives. The Shimazu clan took control of Iwaya Castle marking the conclusion of the siege.
