= Tachibana Dōsetsu =

Japanese samurai

- 立花 道雪
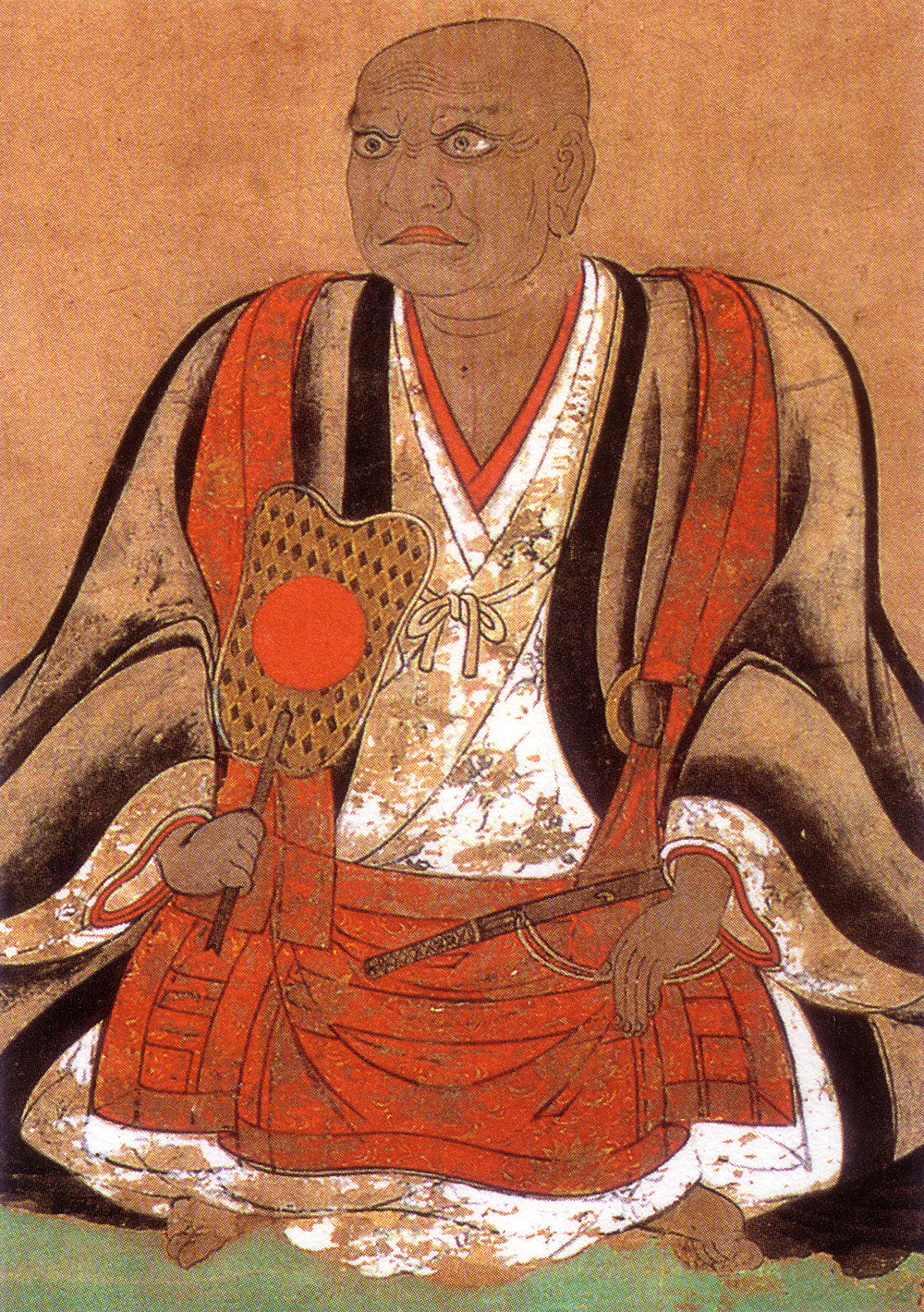

Head of Tachibana clan
- In office 1571–1575
- Preceded by: Tachibana Akitoshi
- Succeeded by: Tachibana Ginchiyo

Personal details
- Born: Bungo Province, 1513
- Died: Chikugo Province, 1585

Military service
- Allegiance: Ōtomo clan Bekki clan
- Battles/wars: Battle of Umegatake castle; Battle of Kurumagaeshi (1535); Akizuki rebel's suppression (1546); Pacification of Bungo (1554); Pacification of Higo; Siege of Mount Kosho castle (1557); Siege of Moji (1561–1562); First Battle of Yanagigaura (1562); Siege of Moji (1563); Fourth Battle of Yanagigaura (1564); Siege of Yasumimatsu castle (1563); Battle of Yasumimatsu; Siege of Mount Kosho castle (1567); Siege of Mount Hōman castle (1567); Siege of Yamakuma Castle (1567); Campaign of Mount Tachibana (1568–1569); Siege of Tachibana castle; Second siege of Tachibana castle; Tatarahama battles (1569); Battle of Imayama (1570); Battle of Saga Castle (1570); Fukuoka campaign (1571–1583); Battle of Junnohara / Battle of Yagiyama (1581); 5th battle of Ima Matsubara (1582); Battle of Iwato (1582); Battle of Sawara (1582); Battle of Koganebara (1582); Siege of Konomidake Castle (1583); Bungo Province reconquest (1584); Siege of Kurume (1585); Siege of Neko'o Castle (1585)

Tachibana Dōsetsu (立花 道雪; 22 April 1513 – 2 November 1585), born Betsugi Akitsura (戸次鑑連), also as Bekki Akitsura, Bekki Dōsetsu, and Totsugi Akitsura, was a Japanese samurai during the Sengoku period who served the Ōtomo clan. A member of the Bekki clan, he was the father of Tachibana Ginchiyo and the adopted father of Tachibana Muneshige.

He was known as one of the wisest Ōtomo retainers and was remembered for his stance against Christianity in the Ōtomo's domain. Dōsetsu was accounted as one of the Sanshuku of the Ōtomo clan, together with Usuki Akisumi and Yoshihiro Akimasa.

Tachibana Dōsetsu's military career is mostly known for his being in 37 military campaigns and more than 100 engagements of smaller scale, despite half of his lower body being paralyzed, including the Battle of Tatarahama, and the brilliant defense of Kurume city.

As a subject of mythical legends and for his personal battle prowess, Dōsetsu earned nicknames such as Hachiman incarnation (弓矢八幡), Thunder god's incarnation (摩利支天の化身), God of war from Kyushu (九州の軍神), and Dōsetsu the ogre (鬼道雪).

Dōsetsu died from illness during a military campaign in Chikugo Province in 1585. His daughter Ginchiyo succeeded him as the Tachibana clan head not too long after.

== Early life ==
Born with the childhood name of Akitsura, in Yoroigatake Castle, Bungo Province, Dōsetsu hailed from the Bekki clan (also romanized the Totsugi clan). He fought his first battle leading 2,000 soldiers when he was 14 years old, replacing his sickly father who had retired from military service. In this campaign, Dōsetsu fought against the Ōuchi clan in Umegatake castle, Buzen Province, where he emerged victorious despite being outnumbered by around 3,000 men.

On August 22, 1535, Dōsetsu lead an army to pacify a rebellion of the Kikuchi clan in Higo Province, where he suppressed the rebels after the battle of Kurumagaeshi, after which Dōsetsu organized 48 of his warriors to form a small elite squad nicknamed the Shiro-Taka or "White Hawks".

In 1546, Dōsetsu and other Ōtomo clan retainers were sent with 10,000 strong troops to suppress the first rebellion of the Akizuki clan.

In 1548, Dōsetsu was recorded to have been struck by a lightning bolt, which caused his left leg to be permanently paralyzed

In 1550, Dōsetsu was involved in the Ōtomo clan's civil war of succession between Ōtomo Sōrin and Ōtomo Shioichimaru. At the end of this conflict, Shioichimaru was killed, while Dōsetsu was sent with an army to attack Irita Chikazane, a Shioichimaru loyalist. Dōsetsu managed to defeat Chikazane's army and forced him flee from Ōtomo territory.

== Military service 1553–1562 ==
In 1553, at the age of 41, Dōsetsu retired as head of the Bekki clan, then adopted Bekki Shigetsura, his half nephew, as his foster son. Dōsetsu also immediately appointed Shigetsura as the next head of the Bekki clan. (Note: One source recorded that he relinquished the lordship of the Bekki clan to Shigetsura in 1550.)

In 1554, Dōsetsu was dispatched to suppress several rebellions that broke out in Bungo and Higo provinces, which were incited by Obara Akimoto, Honjo Shinzaemon, and Nakamura Shinbei.

On 19 May 1556, Dōsetsu's forces suppressed the rebellion of Obara Akimoto. Following that, Dōsetsu sent letters commending his vassals for their outstanding performances during this operation, such as Korenobu Yufu, Takano Daizen, Adachi Sakyō, and Ando Iesada.

In 1557, the Akizuki clan, which was led by Akizuki Kiyotane, again rebelled, with the assistance of a daimyo named Mōri Motonari. In response, Ōtomo Sōrin dispatched Dōsetsu and Usuki Akisumi with 2,000 soldiers to quell the rebellion. Dōsetsu besieged Mount Kosho castle, the stronghold of the Akizuki clan. In the end, Kiyotane and his son committed seppuku inside their castle.

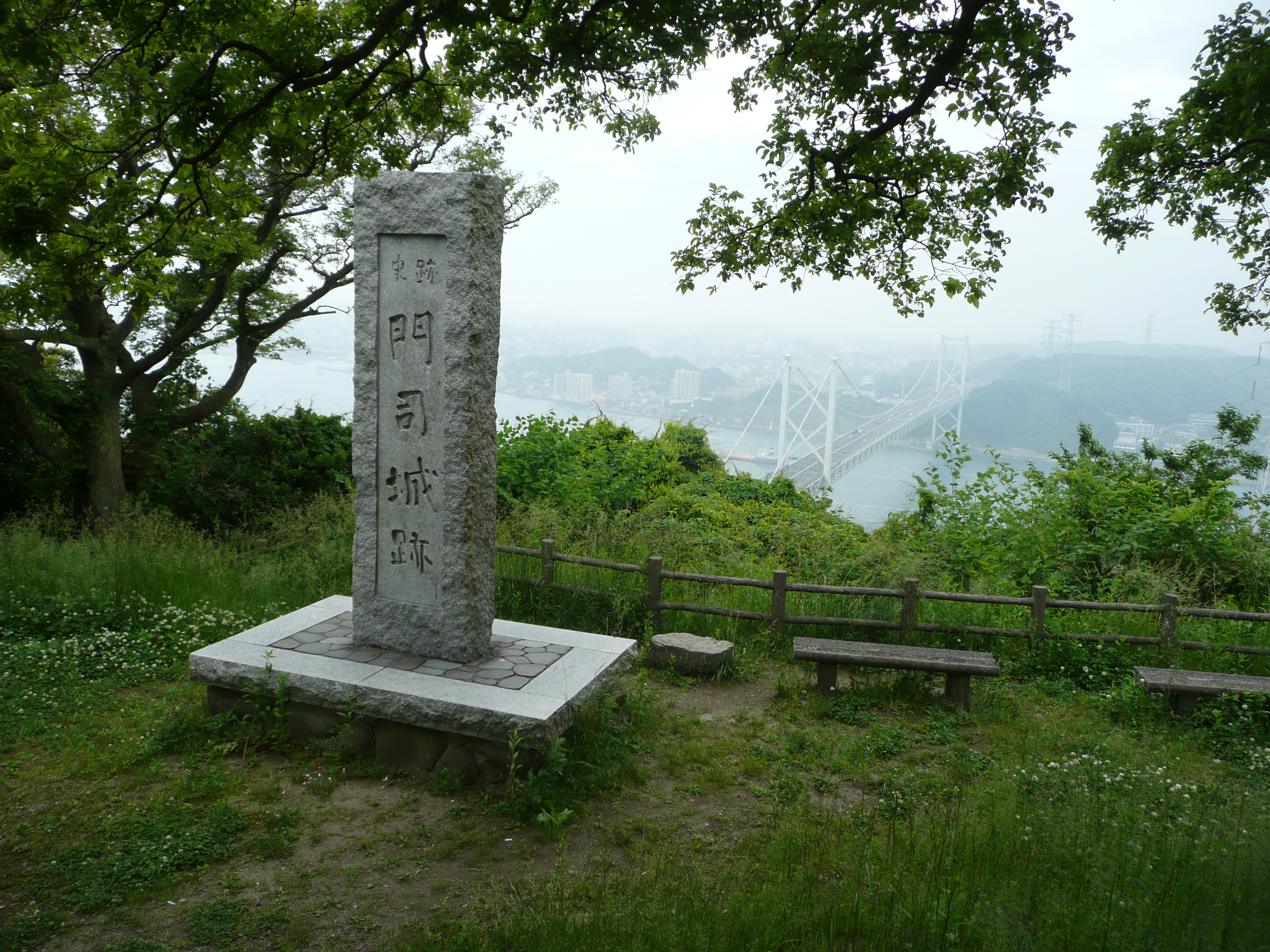
The site of the ruined Moji castle

In 1558, Dōsetsu fought a Mōri clan general named Kobayakawa Takakage in the first siege of Moji castle. In this engagement, Dōsetsu had his 800 archers shower Kobayakawa's army with their arrows.

In 1560, Dōsetsu, Usuki Akisumi, and Yoshihiro Akimasa fought against Munakata Ujisada, the head of the Munakata clan. For his achievements in pacifying the Ōtomo-clan enemies, Dōsetsu was appointed by Sōrin as Kabanshu (personal assistant) and Shugodai (governor) of Chikugo province.

=== Siege of Moji ===
In 1561, during the siege of Moji Castle which was controlled by the Mōri clan, Portuguese merchants assisted Dōsetsu with three ships weighted between 500 and 600 tons. The bombardment from the ships against the castle helped the Ōtomo troops under Dōsetsu's command to maintain the siege. On October 10, however, the castle defenders managed to break the siege after the Portuguese had expended all their ammunition and had withdrawn. The Ōtomo forces failed to take the castle.

In 1562, Dōsetsu began the final phase of this siege. On July 13, Dōsetsu and his subordinate Korenobu Yufu defeated the Mōri clan army in the battle of Yanagigaura in Buzen Province. On October 13, Dōsetsu stormed Moji Castle and managed to subdue the castle, which was defended by Reizei Mototoyo, a former Ouchi clan vassal who was 25 years old. On November 26, there was an all-day battle near Moji Castle, leaving hundreds dead and injured with an unclear result.

== Military service 1563–1570 ==
In 1563, on New Year's Day of the 6th year of Eiroku, a large army led by Mōri Takamoto and Kobayakawa Takakage arrived to relieve Moji Castle from Dōsetsu's besieging army. Dōsetsu and Mōri Takamoto fought until an envoy from Kyoto arrived with a message from the Ashikaga shogunate commanding both Dōsetsu and Takamoto to cease their fighting. Later the same year, Dōsetsu changed his name from Akitsura into Dōsetsu.

On 25 July 1564, the Shogun's envoy secured a temporary truce between the Mōri and the Ōtomo clans. However, this truce did not last long, as on 25 March, in The Fourth Battle of Yanagigaura, Dōsetsu once again fought the Mōri clan army, which was led by Koremaki Yufu.

In 1565, the head of Tachibana clan, Tachibana Munekatsu, rebelled against the Ōtomo clan. Dōsetsu was sent to suppress this rebellion. In the end, the forces of Dōsetsu managed to capture Tachibanayama Castle, which belonged to the rebels. However, Ōtomo Sorin, the head of Ōtomo clan, decided to pardon Tachibana Munekatsu due to his family relationship.

=== Battle of Yasumimatsu ===
Battle of Yasumimatsu
| Date | 1567, September 3rd |
| Location | Around Yasumimatsu Castle in Chikuzen Province |
| Result | Akizuki clan victory |

Belligerents
| Ōtomo clan | Akizuki clan |

Commanders and leaders
| Tachibana Dōsetsu: Koretada Totoki †; Bekki Akitaka †; Bekki Chikashige †; Bekki Chikamune †; Usuki Akisumi: Yoshihiro Tatewaki †; Toshimitsu Hyōgo †; Yoshihiro Akimasa | Akizuki Tanezane: Sakata Moromasa † |

Strength
| 20,000 | 12,000: 4,000 during night raid |

Casualties and losses
| at least 400 | Unknown |

In 1567, Akizuki Tanezane, a surviving son of Akizuki Kiyotane and the new head of the Akizuki clan, managed to recapture the castle of Mount Kosho from the Ōtomo clan and made clear his intention to oppose them. On August 14, in response, Sorin sent Dōsetsu, Usuki Akisumi, and Yoshihiro Akimasa with 20,000 soldiers to punish Tanezane. The Ōtomo army first engaged the Akizuki clan army in the Battle of Amamizu and Haseyama (also known as the Battle of Uryuno) on August 14–15, and captured Ojo, a branch castle of Yasumimatsu Castle, causing the commander of the castle, Moromasa Sakata, to commit suicide. Dōsetsu then stationed his army around Yasumomatsu Castle in preparation of capturing Mount Kosho Castle. However, the castle was well defended and the siege dragged on. Subsequently, rumors circulated among the Ōtomo forces that a huge Mōri clan army in Chugoku was moving to invade Ojo, which prompted the Ōtomo forces to withdraw from the siege of Mount Kosho and abandoned Yasumimatsu Castle on September 3. As Tanezane learned of this development, he decided to sally out and give chase to the withdrawing Ōtomo army by dividing his 12,000 troops into four groups under the command of Kankage Intosho, Sanehisa Uchida Zenbei with over 3,000 cavalry, and Ayabe Suruga no Kami with over 5,000 cavalry. Dōsetsu had already anticipated this movement and fielded a rearguard of 3,000 soldiers with the assistance of his lieutenants, Bekki Shigetsura, Ono Shizuyuki, and Korenobu Yufu, with each of them leading 500 to 600 cavalry. During this attack, the forces of Tanezane managed to inflict many casualties on Dōsetsu's force as they killed one of Dōsetsu's most trusted generals, Koretada Totoki. However, the rearguard of the Dōsetsu force managed to reverse the situation and inflict heavy losses upon the Tanezane troops, forcing them to retreat. Later, at night, Tanezane once again launched an assault with 4,000 soldiers in a night raid. The unexpected night attack by the Akizuki forces threw the Ōtomo army into chaos, as they suffered over 400 casualties. As the battle progressed, Dōsetsu managed to calm his troops and organize an orderly retreat. However, the Tanezane forces pursued the fleeing Dōsetsu's forces further until they reached Chikugo Yamakuma Castle, causing the Ōtomo army to suffer even more casualties. Many of Dōsetsu's clansmen were killed in this battle, such as Bekki Akitaka, Bekki Chikashige, and Bekki Chikamune. Later in August, Dōsetsu marched to Mount Hōman Castle to battle the Akizuki clan. However, he faced stubborn resistance from the Akizuki forces as they clashed twice at Amamizu and Haseyama, before they finally could overcome the Akizuki army through a daring personal charge led by Dōsetsu. On November 15, Ōtomo Sorin sent Dōsetsu to further combat the Akizuki clan, when Dōsetsu managed to capture the enemy castle on Mount Hōman. Dōsetsu was recorded as being armed with a long sword in this battle. Later that year, Dōsetsu captured Yamakuma Castle from Tanezane.

=== Further military campaigns ===
In 1568, Mōri Motonari dispatch his army, commanded by Shimizu Munenori, to besiege Mount Tachibana Castle. However, Dōsetsu's forces managed to defend the castle. In this battle, four of Dōsetsu vassals, Tsuresada Totoki, Takano Daizen, Korenobu Yufu, and Ando Iesada, gained fame in the battle, and later received the nicknames of Dōsetsu-Shitennō(Four heavenly kings of Dōsetsu). The Mōri invasion also involved Tachibana Munekatsu, the head of the Tachibana clan, who betrayed the Ōtomo clan for the second time. Later that year, Dōsetsu Dōsetsu, Yoshihiro Akimasa, and Shiga Chikamori were dispatched by Sorin to lead 30,000 soldiers to besiege Tachibanayama Castle, which was defended by Tachibana Munekatsu. on July 4, they stormed the branch castle of Tachibana, on the cliff of Tachibana Mountain, and took 28 soldiers of Munekatsu captive. Later that night, one of Munekatsu's vassal defected into Dōsetsu's ranks, and assisted the Ōtomo army in subduing the castle. On July 23, after the fall of various parts of Mount Tachibana's fortifications, Munekatsu fled to his last remaining castle, while Ōtomo forces pursued him, until Munekatsu committed suicide inside the castle. On the same day, Dōsetsu and Takahashi Shigetane continued their operation against the Mōri clan's reinforcement that had been sent to reinforce Munekatsu. The standoff of Dōsetsu and Takahashi Shigetane against the Mōri continued until the next night, when Dōsetsu led a night raid against the Mōri army's supply base and forced the Mōri forces to retreat. On July 29, Dōsetsu and other Ōtomo generals commenced clean-up operation against the remaining resistances in the Mount Tachibana area, until 5,000 Mōri clan soldiers headed by Shimizu Munenori and Harada Takatane arrived to Tachibana Mountain on August 2. To resist this newly arrived enemy, Dōsetsu, Usuki Akisumi, and Yoshihiro Akimasa engaged the Mōri clan forces at the foot of Mount Tachibana. The result of this battle ended with an Ōtomo victory with the Mōri clan army routed and more than 300 Mōri being captured. Following the end of the Munekatsu rebellion and the failure of Mōri clan assistance, the office of the Tachibana clan was postponed from being inherited by Munekatsu's legitimate heir. (Note: Tachibana Shinzen, before later in 1571, Sorin instead gave the office of Tachibana clan to Dōsetsu.)

On November 25, Dōsetsu entered Chikugo Akashi Castle and married Hitoshihime, the daughter of Monchūsho Akitoyo, an Otomo vassal.

In 1569, Dōsetsu was involved in the failed defense of Tachibana Castle, where the enemy forces under Mōri Motonari, by the extensive use of cannons, defeated Dosetsu forces. It was said that the reason Dōsetsu was forced to abandon the castle was a lack of supplies. Later the same year, Dōsetsu personally led the Otomo forces against the Mōri clan in the Tatara area (located in modern-day Higashi-ku, Fukuoka), where they engaged in at least four battles which ended in deadlocks.

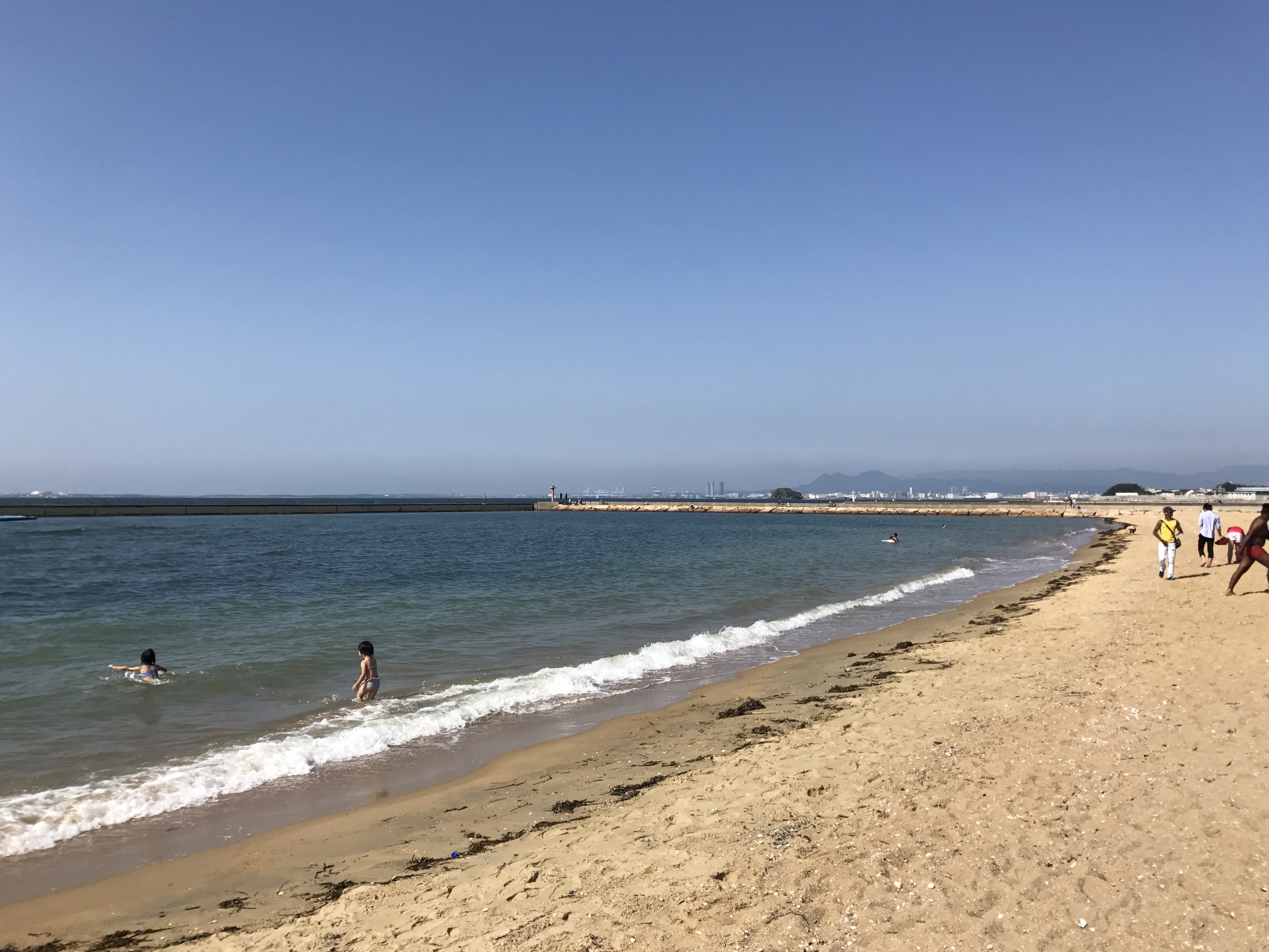
Hakata Bay, where Dōsetsu fought the Mōri clan army at the Battle of Tatarahama

On 18 May, after several engagements at the Battle of Tatarahama, the Ōtomo army, led by Dōsetsu, Usuki Akisumi, and Yoshihiro Akimasa, clashed with 40,000 soldiers under Kikkawa Motoharu and Kobayakawa Takakage. During the fierce battle, Dōsetsu lead the charge into the enemy formation and killed more than ten of the enemy and managed to defeat the Motoharu vanguard, which was led by Yoshikawa Motoharu's vanguard, led by Nobuki Narazaki. Then, Yoshikawa Motoharu used iron cannon to counterattack. The situation was described as dire for the Ōtomo side before Dōsetsu charged towards a gap in the formation of Takakage's army, allowing other Dōsetsu generals to reorganize themselves and rearrange their artillery. Dōsetsu, riding his horse, charged forward into the enemy camp while drawing his sword. The army of Motoharu and Takakage was unable to resist and was pushed back. From 21 to 26 May, following the battle of Tatatahama, there were about 18 more clashes in the area between the Dōsetsu and the Mōri army with undetermined results. At this point, the Mōri clan suddenly lost their motivation to defend Tachibana Castle from Dōsetsu, as their own territories were threatened by Yamanaka Yukimori and Ōuchi Teruhiro. Then the Mōri sued for peace, which was accepted by the Ōtomo on the condition that Tachibana Castle be relinquished back to them.

On 23 April 1570, Dōsetsu fought the forces of Ryūzōji Takanobu and Nabeshima Naoshige in the Battle of Imayama. In this engagement, Dōsetsu was recorded as riding a palanquin for the first time, to support his disabled left leg during the battle. After this battle, Dōsetsu advanced further to engage the Ryūzōji army on the eastern flank of Saga Castle until September, after which Dōsetsu negotiated a truce with Ryūzōji Takanobu. However, this campaign, which ended on 20 August, was considered a catastrophic defeat to Ōtomo forces, due to the massive casualties they suffered and failure to complete their objectives.

== Military service 1571–1579 ==
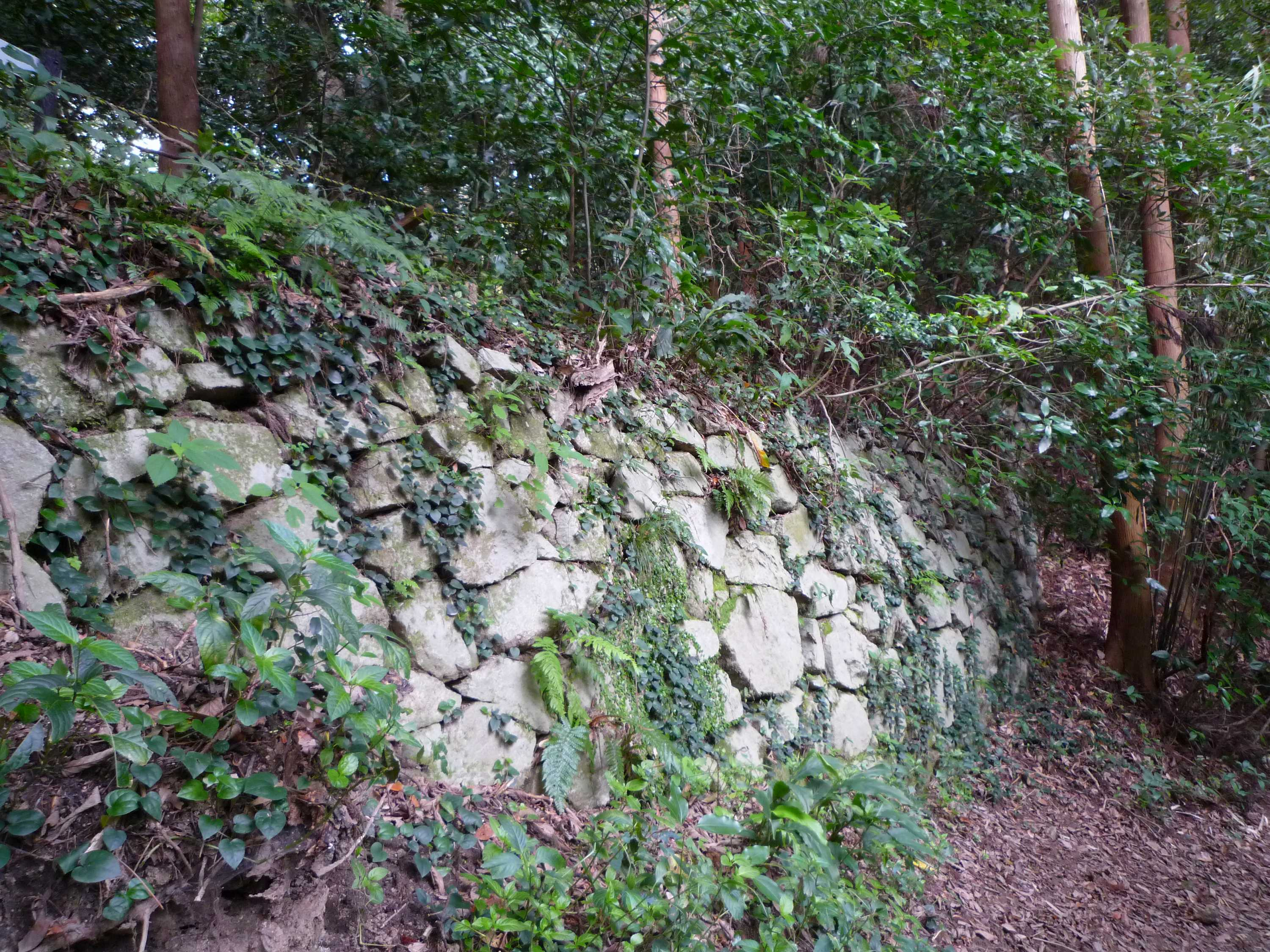
Stone wall of Tachibana Castle Ruins.

In 1571, Dōsetsu was appointed as the official head of Tachibana clan, and received the surname of Tachibana. As he now controlled Tachibanayama Castle, Dōsetsu was tasked to maintain the defense of the northwestern reaches of Bungo Province. However, as Dōsetsu was now tasked to defend Tachibana castle, the Bekki clan, which Dōsetsu originally hailed from, was divided in their opinions, as there were some who wanted to remain in Bekki clan's traditional domain, Fujikita, while other vassals of Bekki clan, such as Andō Ietada, chose to follow Dōsetsu into Tachibana. (Note: Nakano Anai stated Dōsetsu were appointed as head of the Tachibana clan in 1570) Furthermore, Dōsetsu was also promoted to Shugodai of Chikuzen Province, causing Dōsetsu to now hold virtually limitless authority over the province. In the same year, Dōsetsu took Munakata Irohime, sister of his old enemy, Munakata Ujisada, as concubine. Dōsetsu was 59 years old, while Irohime was 25 years old. This was considered as a reconciliatory political marriage between the Munakata and the Ōtomo clans.

In 1575, Dōsetsu tried to adopt his vassal, Komono Masutoki, as the heir of the Tachibana clan. However, Masutoki declined to be adopted, Dōsetsu now changing his focus for the Tachibana clan heir to his daughter's only daughter, Tachibana Ginchiyo. Dōsetsu did secure authorization from Ōtomo Sorin to appoint Ginchiyo as the heir of the Tachibana clan. After Sorin granted him permission, Dōsetsu immediately retired as the head of Tachibana clan and appointed Ginchiyo, who at that time was still 7 years old, as head of the Tachibana clan. Dōsetsu also resigned from the position of Karō (senior official) of the Ōtomo clan, and assumed a more active role in the military command of Chikuzen Province.

=== Defense of Chikuzen Province ===
In 1578, Dōsetsu and Takahashi Shigetane led a military operation in Tsukushi Province, from which they pacified Iwaya Castle in Chikuzen Province, until they stopped at Shibata River. However, later in the same year the Ōtomo clan suffered a disastrous defeat at the Battle of Mimigawa at the hands of the Shimazu clan. Nevertheless, the defeat of the Ōtomo clan in Mimigawa prompted Dōsetsu to write many letters to Yoshimune and other high ranking vassals of the clan wherein he blamed the setbacks and also various rebellions by former Ōtomo vassals such as Akizuki Tanezane to the apostasy of many people in the region and conversions to Christianity. This harsh criticism from Dōsetsu caused many Ōtomo vassals to change their attitude towards Christianity and European missionaries, while Yoshimune himself even told Luís Fróis that he would not sponsor Christianity anymore in Ōtomo's territory. As the Ōtomo clan indeed suffered massive defections from their vassals due to their loss in Mimigawa, Dōsetsu stayed loyal. However, Tachibana Castle, which was located in the frontier of Ōtomo clan territories, now became vulnerable to enemy invasion. In 11–13 December, Ryuzoji Takanobu worked together with Tsukushi Hirokado and Akizuki Tanezane to invade Chikuzen, while Dōsetsu and his army worked hard to defend those territories.

Map of Japanese provinces (1868) with Chikuzen Province highlighted

In 1579, in mid-January, Dōsetsu participated in the second Ōtomo invasion of Tsukushi Province and Dazaifu town, against the Akizuki clan, forcing Akizuki Tanezane to abandon his siege of Takatoriyama Castle. After that, Dōsetsu besieged Iwaya Castle for the second time. In March, Dōsetsu besieged Iwaya Castle for the third time with some subsequent clashes against the forces of Akizuki Tanezane. Following that, Dōsetsu engaged the Akizuki clan forces in the Battle of Yatake, Chikuzen Province. On 18 April, Dōsetsu rescued an Ōtomo-clan general named Shiga Chikamori, from being pursued by Akizuki Tanezane, by tricking the latter with some deceptions. Tanezane then withdrew his army as he believed the ruse. On 12–18 July, Dōsetsu defeated Harada Nobutane in the Battle of Namamatsuhara. On 27 July, Dōsetsu repelled a joint attack from Tanezane and Nobutane. From 18 August until early September, Dōsetsu engaged in three separate battles against the armies of Harada Nobutane, Munakata Ujisada, and the Sugi clan in Tatarahama, Hakozaki, and near Agematsu Castle, respectively. In September, Dōsetsu and other Ōtomo generals fought in five separate battles against the allied forces of the Akizuki, Ryuzoji, Munakata, and Harada clans, in places such as Arahei Castle, Ikeda Castle, and Kosoyama Castle.

On 15 November to 29 December, Dōsetsu was involved in five engagements against the Akizuki clan and their allies, such as Tsukushi Hirokado and the Harada clan.

== Military service 1580–1584 ==
In 1580, Dōsetsu sent a letter to 13 senior retainers of Ōtomo Yoshimune, the heir to Sorin. In that letter, Dōsetsu condemned the spread of Christianity in the territories of the Ōtomo clan. On 2 February, Dōsetsu fought the forces of the Ryuzoji clan in Sawara, Chiba. In May, he managed to capture a castle in Chikuzen from Munakata Ujisada. On 10 September, Dōsetsu clashed with Ujisada in the Yoshikawa area of Fukuoka, followed, in October, by the second Battle of Kama-Honami, the Battle of Mount Ishigaki, and the Battle of Yagiyama Ishizaka. From 3 November to December, Dōsetsu fought the forces of Akizuki Tanezane and Munakata Ujisada.

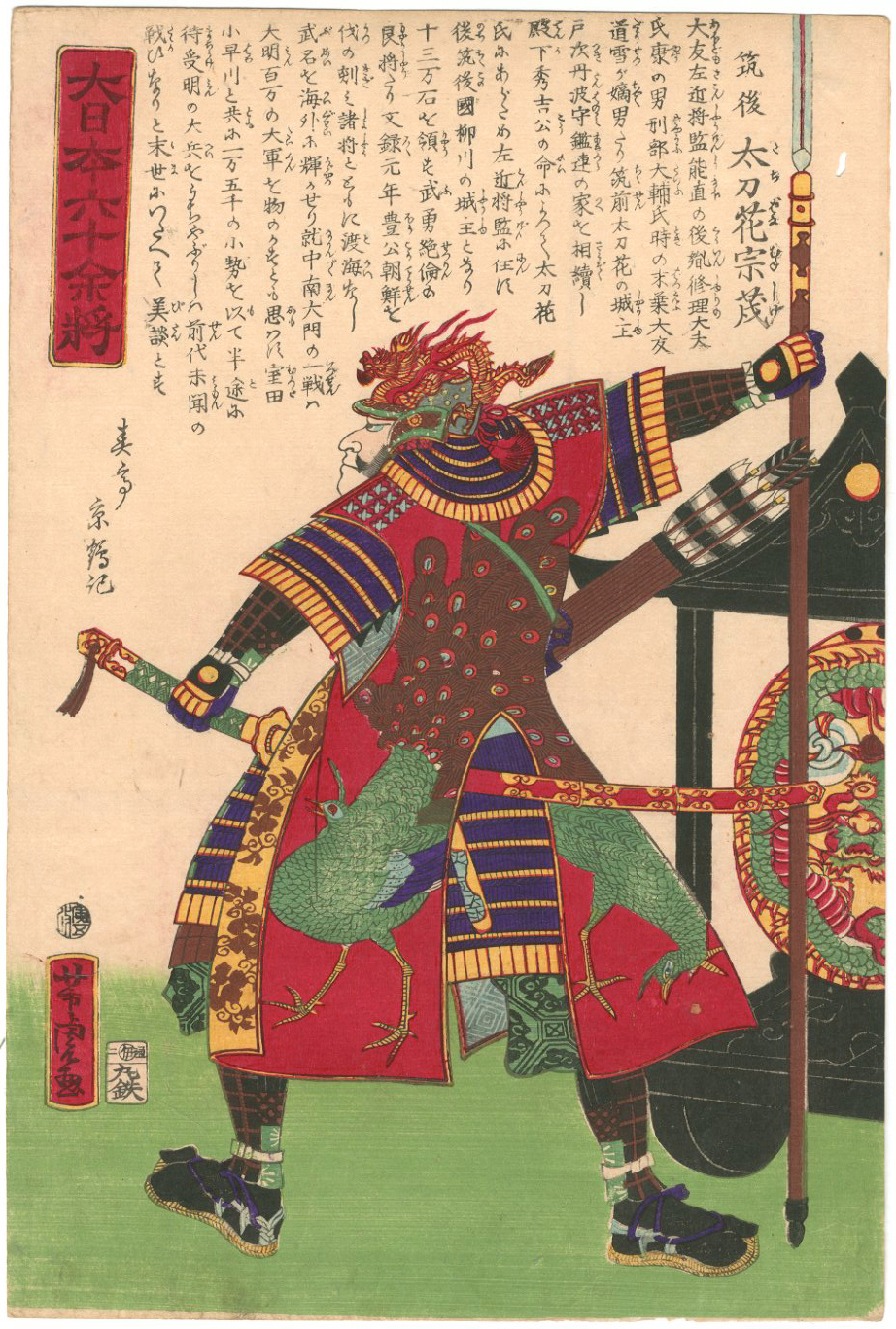
Tachibana Muneshige, Dōsetsu's son-in-law and future head of Tachibana clan

In 1581, Dōsetsu participated in several engagements against Akizuki Tanezane. First, Dōsetsu fought Tanezane and Ujisada in the Battle of Koganebara, which was recorded as the largest military engagement in Kurate District, Fukuoka, up to that time. In this battle, Dōsetsu inflicted a crushing defeat on his enemies, which left the territories under the control of Ujisada vulnerable to further incursions by Dōsetsu's army. Later, Dōsetsu again fought Tanezane in Shimizuhara, and at Takatori Castle.

On 27 July, Dōsetsu and Shigetane fought Tsukushi Hirokado and Akizuki Tanezane in the Second Battle of Dazaifu Kanzeon-ji. It was in this battle that Takahashi Munetora, who would become known as Tachibana Muneshige, saw his first notable action. Contemporary Italian Jesuit Alessandro Valignano recorded that Muneshige was adopted by Dōsetsu and inherited the headship of the Tachibana clan. At first, Shigetane declined. However, Dōsetsu implored him and stated that although he had Ginchiyo as inheritor of his clan, he needed strong young samurai to lead the Tachibana clan in the future. He further stated that, after his death, strong commanders would be needed to lead both the Takahashi and Tachibana clans to defend the declining Ōtomo clan. As he saw that the Takahashi Shigetane potential heirs were many, then he needed Muneshige to inherit the headship of Tachibana. Thus, Shigetane finally accepted this reasoning and agreed to give Muneshige for the Tachibana clan. Then, as he secured the adoption, Dōsetsu immediately changed the lordship of the Tachibana clan from his daughter, Ginchiyo, to Muneshige.

On 6 November, Dōsetsu, along with Muneshige and Shigetane, marched to Kama and Honami. While on their way to the rescue of Kutami Akiyasu, the Tachibana and Takahashi forces received information that Akiyasu had safely retreated after fighting Akizuki Tanezane and Monjūjo Munekage the elder (great-uncle of Monjūjo Munekage the younger) in the Battle of Haratsuru. However, the Tanezane forces were still pursuing them. Both battles resulted in over 1,000 casualties, including over 300 casualties from the Tachibana and Takahashi, and 760 from the Akizuki clan. (Note: ^ The Tachibana side referred to this battle as the Battle of Junnohara (also called the Third Battle of Kama and Honami, the Battle of Junnohara, or the Second Battle of Yagiyama-Ishizaka (a battle that took place at the Dainichi-ji entrance on the Yagiyama Ishizaka road in Honami County, a different battle from the Second Battle of Dazaifu Kanzeonji and the Second Battle of Dazaifu Ishizaka in Ishizaka, Dazaifu City on July 27 of the same year)), while the Akizuki side referred to it as the Battle of Yagiyama.)

On 10 February 1582, Dōsetsu fought the Harada clan forces in the Fifth Battle of Ima Matsubara. Later, on 16 March, he fought Ujisada forces in the Battle of Mount Konomi. On 16 April, Dōsetsu and Tachibana Muneshige besieged Iwato Castle, which was under the control of Nobutane. In the morning, Dōsetsu crossed the Naka River with 1,000 of his soldiers, then he divided them into two groups before storming the castle and forcing the defenders to abandon it, allowing Dōsetsu to claim the castle.

On 16 April 1582, during the Battle of Iwato, against the combined forces of 2,000 from the Akizuki, Harada, and Munakata clans, Dōsetsu led a 500-strong ambush force and surrounded the enemy's 1,000-strong main force. 300 of Muneshige's troops launched a surprise attack from the side with guns, while the remaining 200 soldiers were led by Komono Masutoki, who set up a false flag to make it look like reinforcements from the Ōtomo clan were coming, and finally managed to lift the siege. Muneshige then led 1,000 cavalry including Komono Masutoki, Korenobu Yufu, and Shigeyuki Ono, and eliminated 300 of the Harada general's troops. Kasa Okinaga, who had built a fort at Iwatosho Kubeno, killed 150 of them, and pursued them westward to Sawara County, where he burned down Harada Chikahide's Sawara Castle.

On 2 October, Dōsetsu sent his retainer Yoshida Rensama to assist Shigetane in recapturing Yonenoyama Castle from the Akizuki clan. It was recorded that 200 soldiers of the Akizuki clan were slain during this battle. On 12 November, Dōsetsu was tasked by Mori Shizuma, an Ōtomo clan vassal, to govern the town of Takatori. On the following day, as Dōsetsu was transporting military supplies to Nōgata, he was ambushed by Munakata Ujisada's army at Miyawaka. As Dōsetsu's forces fought back, they managed to repulse Ujisada forces, although they suffered many losses. On the following day, 14 November, Dōsetsu once again clashed with Ujisada forces, while the next day Dōsetsu hastily marched his army to capture Miyaji town at Fukutsu, Fukuoka, while Ujisada was still occupied with defending Kōbitake Castle. The last military engagement Dōsetsu was involved with in 1582 occurred on 22 December, when Dōsetsu, Shigetane, and Muneshige fought against Ujisada.

From January to February 1583, Dōsetsu and Shigetane fought the Tsukushi clan in Hakata-ku, Fukuoka. From February to April, Dōsetsu managed to repel repeated attacks from Tsukushi Hirokado. On 23 April, Dōsetsu and Shigetane stormed Konomidake Castle, which was defended by Ujisada, causing the latter to flee into Hakusan Castle.

=== Bungo Province reconquest ===
Location of Bungo Province

In March 1584, after Ryūzōji Takanobu was killed at the Battle of Okitanawate, the Ōtomo clan launched a reconquest of Ryūzōji territories, which formerly belonged to the Ōtomo, by invading Bungo Province. However, they were unable to subdue Chikugo Neko'o Castle which was defended by Kuroki Ienaga. This prompted Yoshimune to request assistance from Dōsetsu and Takahashi Shigetane on 18 August.

In response, Dōsetsu and Shigetane marched their force of 5,000 soldiers, crossing the mountainous and difficult terrain of the Chikugo River, Minou Mountains, Kujukujiri, and Takatori Mountain. while defeating the Tsukushi clan and Akizuki clan forces. The next opponent Dōsetsu and Shigetane faced was the Kusano and Hoshino clans, which Dōsetsu and Shigetane defeated in a series of battle at Tanushimaru Town, Katase, Eritoguchi, and Ishigaki, spanning 60 kilometer of from their starting point. On the 20 August, Dōsetsu appointed his vassal, Ujibe Tsubakihara to command an assault against Takamure Castle, which surrendered on 24 August. Then the forces of Dōsetsu and Shigetane further advanced and subdued Inuo Castle. On 25 August, they moving further to Mount Okagoya, where local samurai clans in the area submitted and joined the Ōtomo side. On 28 August, Dōsetsu sent his general Tachibana Shizumi to lead a detachment of 800 soldiers to besiege Jojima Castle. (Note: According to the first collection of the Yanagawa Domain history Series, he was killed in the Battle of Chikugo Castle. meanwhile, "Yanagawa City History" chronicle has stated that Shizumi was killed in action at Nishimuta Castle during the Mizuma District mopping up battle in late November.) However, this detachment failed to subdue the castle. (Note: depends on the version, according to "Komono family records", they manage to subdue the castle. while according to "Nabeshima Naoshige Documents from Hizen and Chikugo ", Dōsetsu and Shigetane army were failed.) From 8–11 September, Dōsetsu and Shigetane continued their march while subduing many Chikugo Province castles, such as Yamashita Castle, Tanigawa Castle, Henshun Castle, Kanematsu Castle, and Yamazaki Castle, and are recorded as having burned several villages surrounding Yanagawa castle on the 9th.

On 3 October, Dōsetsu and Shigetane stormed Takei Castle and razed it. On 28 October they pursued the fleeing enemy led by Kusano Chin'ei, who retreated to Hosshindake Castle. However, they failed to capture that castle, and Dōsetsu and Shigetane moved further onto another objective and captured Takatori Castle/Hoshino Castle (Yamanonaka Castle) and Fukumaru Castle on their way, until they captured Inoue Castle on 14 November. Furthermore, after burning down several settlements within Akizuki Clan's territory around Amagi and Amamizu, Dōsetsu and Shigetane proceeded to capture many castles in Mizuma District. However, they subsequently learned that the Akizuki clan forces managed to defeat an Ōtomo clan forces led by Chikaie Tawara, which forced Dōsetsu and Shigetane to abort their operation and returned to Mount Tawara and establish camp there with other Ōtomo generals such as Kutami Akiyasu and Chiga Shikamori. From then on, the year passed with their forces stationed in Kitano.

== Defense of Kurume 1585 ==
Siege of Kurume
- Location of Kurume, where the anti-Ōtomo forces besiege the town
| Date | 1585 |
| Location | Kurume, Chikugo Province, Kyushu island |
| Result | Ōtomo clan victory, siege failed |

Belligerents
| Ōtomo clan | Anti Ōtomo alliance: Ryūzōji clan; Akizuki clan; Tsukushi clan; Nabeshima clan; Samurai clans from Hizen, Chikuzen, Chikugo, and Buzen |

Commanders and leaders
| Tachibana Dōsetsu; Takahashi Shigetane | Ryūzōji Ieharu; Kusano Chin'ei; Nabeshima Naoshige; Tsukushi Hirokado; Ki Shigefusa; Nagano Sukemori; Goto Ienobu |

Strength
| 9,800 | 30,000 |

Casualties and losses
| Unknown | Unknown |

In 1585, Dōsetsu was involved in a defense against a massive invasion by an anti-Ōtomo alliance led by Ryūzōji Ieharu. This alliance involved many Ōtomo enemies such as Kusano Chin'ei, Nabeshima Naoshige, Tsukushi Hirokado, Ki Shigefusa (also known as Utsunomiya Chinfusa), Nagano Sukemori, and Goto Ienobu. This alliance was further augmented by samurai clans from Hizen, Chikuzen, Chikugo, and Buzen, adding up to 30,000 soldiers in strength, while Dōsetsu and Takahashi Shigetane had only 9,800 soldiers under their command. The alliance began their attacks towards Kurume town.

Dōsetsu and Shigetane managed to gain a series of victories over the numerically superior allied forces with a combination of brilliant maneuvers and tactics in three separate battles:

- At first, on 8 April, Dōsetsu and Shigetane launched an assault on Yanagawa, killing enemy troops and capture enemy generals such as Ryuzouji Shinsuke. Then they followed up by burning down Yanagawa and returning to the coast of Takao. Later, the Ōtomo forces splitting their 9,800 soldiers into two groups.
- Then, Dōsetsu and Shigetane camped at Takara mountain, before they once again deployed their army on 18 April, storming Hatsushin Castle and capturing it. Dōsetsu and Shigetane managed to repulse the Ryūzōji clan reinforcements, which had been sent to the castle.
- In the final phase of this series of engagements around the vicinity of Kurume town, the anti-Ōtomo forces were beaten back with losses after Dōsetsu and Shigetane fought ferociously to defend their position.

On 23 April, Ieharu and Hirokado committed their reserve of 16,000 troops and divided their force into five sections besieging Kurume. Dōsetsu and Shigetane engaged the allied forces with a combination of skillful artillery salvos, defensive formation tactics, and timely counterattacks, which in the end caused the allied siege to collapse.

=== Death ===
In 1585, during the siege of Neko'o Castle, Chikugo Province, Dōsetsu fell ill. Then as his condition worsened, and he felt he was about to die, Dōsetsu told his retainers to put his body in armor and bury it on Mt. Kora facing Yanagawa Castle. Thus he passed on September 11 at the age of 73. However, as Takahashi Shigetane and Tachibana Muneshige feared that the enemy would desecrate Dōsetsu's body after a contemplated retreat, they did not fulfill his wishes and instead brought his corpse along with them on their retreat. Upon his death, Dōsetsu was recorded to have fought in 37 campaigns and more than 100 minor engagements while about half of his body was paralyzed.

== Personal attributes ==
Dōsetsu was known for his loyalty to the Ōtomo clan. However, he was not afraid to criticize his lord. When, in 1578, Ōtomo Sorin planned to subjugate the Shimazu clan in southern Kyushu, Dōsetsu firmly opposed this policy. Later, when indeed Sorin was crushed by the Shimazu clan at the Battle of Mimigawa, Dōsetsu immediately harshly criticized Sorin. However, although the aftermath of this crushing defeat caused many of their vassals to lose confidence in the Ōtomo clan and defect, Dōsetsu stayed loyal and kept defended the Ōtomo clan. On one occasion, Dōsetsu even killed a pet monkey of Sorin with a Japanese war fan, as he saw Sorin was too self-indulgent with partying and playing with his pet. Furthermore, it was recorded that he changed his name from Hetsugi to Dōsetsu in 1563 in a deliberate attempt to associate himself with loyalty to Sorin, as he saw Dōsetsu, which literally means "road's snow", as symbolizing a loyalty in terms of a road that, frozen by snow, would never change its way, to be interpreted as his never changing his way or betraying his master until his own death.

Dōsetsu was notoriously known as a ruthless disciplinarian. During the campaign against the Ryuzoji clan at Chikuzen Kawarasaki, he learned that some of his soldiers had left camp without permission and returned to their homes. Dōsetsu immediately dispatched other soldiers and ordered them to execute not only those deserting soldiers who had returned home, but also their parents. Despite the urging of other senior military officers to not kill those soldier's parents, Dōsetsu insisted, as he viewed the parents as equally guilty.

Dōsetsu was said to possess a "strength that above any ordinary men" and mastered a particular sword style that was named tachiuchi ni myō o etaru (the art of slashing in all directions). According to the chronicle of Bekkidōsetsu Jō-jō Bekki gundan, Dōsetsu managed to personally kill three Mōri clan generals, namely Motonori Akagawa, Motochika Katsura, and Motoyo Reisen, during the Battle of Yanagigaura on 13 October 1562. On the 14th, during the same battle, Dōsetsu reportedly cut down seven enemy warriors and personally charged into the enemy camp while on horseback, after which he received the nickname 'Oni-Dōsetsu' (Demon-Dōsetsu). Meanwhile, other records, from Bekki Gundan and Kyūshū shoshō gunki, have stated that in 1567 Dōsetsu personally killed two enemy warriors, namely Katsura Motochika and Akagawa Motonori. During a battle with the Mori clan in 1569, Dōsetsu killed at least ten enemy warriors personally.

It was said that Dōsetsu was respected and admired even by his enemies. Nabeshima Naoshige reportedly shed tears after hearing the death of Dōsetsu, while Ryūzōji Takanobu once praised Dōsetsu as "a best military figure in his time who are a lover of martial arts and literatures".

Meanwhile, his contemporary, the famous daimyo of Kai Province, Takeda Shingen, reportedly had heard of the reputation of Dōsetsu, and once said that Shingen said he "would like to fight Dōsetsu in a battle and test his fighting skills", although Shingen lamented that the distance between his territory and that of Dōsetsu's were too far apart.

=== Weaponry and armor ===
According to folklore, while Dōsetsu was still a young man he was taking shelter under a tree, as it was raining. Suddenly, a lightning bolt struck him. However, Dōsetsu unsheathed his Chidori sword to cut the Thunder God inside the lightning bolt, allowing himself to survive. After this incident, he renamed his 'Chidori' to 'Raikiri'. The sword which is now preserved in a museum has discolored marks on its tip, which allegedly are the result of being struck by lightning bolt once.

Aside from Raikiri, Dōsetsu also possessed a 85 cm katana sword made by Bizen Kiyomitsu.

A yari (Japanese spear) belonging to Dōsetsu is also preserved in the Tachibana Museum in Yanagawa city. It was reported that Dōsetsu used this spear to fight during the Battle of Mount Tachibana valley on 4 July 1568, when he fought against Tachibana Akitoshi, the former head of Tachibana clan who rebelled against the Ōtomo clan.

The Tachibana Museum also preserved a naginata (polearm) which dates from 1553 and which belonged to the Tachibana clan. Its blade length 65 cm while its curvature is 2.1 cm. This naginata was said to be one of the naginatas carried by 100 soldiers while escorting Dōsetsu's carriage during battles.

=== Warfare ===
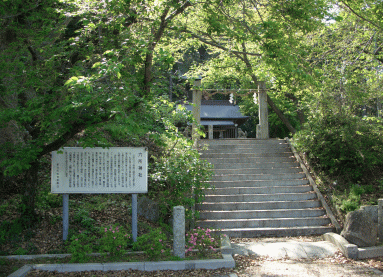
Tachibana Dōsetsu reportedly always praying in this Rokusho Shrine before going to war

As a military commander, Dōsetsu participated in melee combats during his wars, despite suffering from paralysis in his left leg due to an accident at a point during his life, which forced him to ride in a carriage carried by his followers, even during battles. He also is said to keep his personal arquebus Tanegashima gun on the side of his carriage. There would be about 100 soldiers surrounding his carriage to escort him in battles. Dōsetsu was said to command the soldiers who carried him to take him along in his carriage when charging into enemy ranks during battles.

Under Dōsetsu command were many units which were unique to his clan. Those units were usually given extravagant sobriquets, such as "Tachibana clan's four heavenly kings" (Shitennō), "Dōsetsu's 48 White hawk warriors" (Shirotaka), "Tachibana's 32 spear warriors" (San jū ni yari hashira), or "Dōsetsu's two great kings" (no niō) These units usually consisted of the most elite and trusted retainers of both the Bekki and Tachibana clans. However, the membership of this units also changed many times during Dōsetsu lifetime. For example, the 48 White hawk Warriors often recruited new members to replace those who had retired or been killed in battle in order to sustain their numbers. Meanwhile, to help him maintain the administrations, Dōsetsu appointed seven of his most senior retainers as karō (家老; chief retainer).

Dōsetsu was also known as avid reader of military strategy in Sun Tzu's The Art of War. Later, in a Ōtomo military campaign, together with Takahashi Shigetane, Dōsetsu fought using the hōen (square) defensive formation, which included six ranks of arquebusiers and two ranks of bows to fend off attacks. In this battle, Shigetane used a defensive formation which was called the kōyaku formation. Another tactic implemented by Dōsetsu was an ad-hoc maneuver called Nagao-Gakari (長尾懸かり). This tactic involved two ranks of riflemen which would shoot their guns in rotation, followed by spearmens charging forward, which was further followed by cavalry troops charging from behind them.

Dōsetsu was also known for his innovations in gunpowder warfare, as, according to one record, Dōsetsu once conducted experiments on complex movements of iron cannons before firing. He also invented a method of mixing ammunition and projectiles for one shot into bamboo tubes, or cartridges. This technique was rumored to allow the musket gunners of Tachibana clan to fire salvos of their matchlock rifles three times faster than other contemoporary rifle gunners in Japan. This technique, called hayagō, was reportedly used by Tachibana Muneshige during the Siege of Ōtsu in 1600.

== In popular culture ==
The 18th-century Japanese philosopher Miura Baien wrote an elegy that praised Tachibana Dōsetsu for his wisdom, courage, and honor.

Tachibana Dōsetsu is depicted in the Japanese semi-historical novel Honō no gunsen Tachibana Dōsetsu, by Nishizu Hiromi.

In the popular anime series Naruto, there are techniques named "Chidori" and "Raikiri". To reference the story of Dōsetsu, a major character named Kakashi Hatake uses one of these techniques to cut a bolt of lightning in half.

In the anime series Katana Maidens, Chidori is the sword used by the main character, Eto Kanami.

Tachibana appears in the video game Samurai Warriors 2: Empires as a generic officer.

Tachibana is mentioned in the description of the Raikiri, which is usable in the fantasy RPG Nioh.

== See also ==
- Shigashi

== Appendix ==
=== Bibliography ===
- (橘山遺事) 戸次道雪と高橋紹運の事績が書かれて漢翻訳 [(Tachibana Memorial) The achievements of Bekki Dōsetsu and Shoun Takahashi were written and translated into Chinese; Ansei year 2nd edition] (in Japanese). 高知図書館. 1855.
- 阿部猛; 西村圭子, eds. (1990), 戦国人名事典 (コンパクト ed.), 新人物往来社
- 吉永 正春 (2009). 筑前戦国史 増補改訂版 (in Japanese). 海鳥. ASIN 4874157394.
- 川口, 素生 (2006). 戦国名軍師列伝 [Legends of Sengoku tacticians]. PHP文庫. PHP研究所.
- 川口, 素生 (2009). 戦国軍師人名事典 [Encyclopedia of Sengoku military tacticians]. 学研M文庫. 学習研究社.
- 中野等、穴井綾香 (2012). 柳川市史編集委員会 (ed.). 柳川の歴史4・近世大名立花家.
- 中野等 (2001). 立花宗茂. 人物叢書227. 吉川弘文館.
- Alan Strathern (2020). "The Many Meanings of Iconoclasm: Warrior and Christian Temple-Shrine Destruction in Late Sixteenth Century Japan". Journal of Early Modern History. 25 (3). Brill: 163–193. doi:10.1163/15700658-BJA10023.
- Alan Strathern (2020b). "Immanent Power and Empirical Religiosity". Japanese Journal of Religious Studies. 47 (2). Nanzan University: 247–278. JSTOR 26966455.
- Alessandro Valignano (1954). Luis Alvarez-Taladriz, José (ed.). Sumario de las cosas de Japón (1583) Adiciones del Sumario de Japón (1592) · Volume 1 (in Spanish). Sophia University. pp. 114–6.
- Banri Hoashi (1835). 国書データベース: 井樓纂聞 梅岳公遺事 [Kokusho Sōmokuroku: Seirousanbun: The Iji of Lord Baigaku] (in Japanese). Niigata University Library.
- Hall, John W.; Hall, John Whitney; Brown, Delmer M.; McClain, James L.; McCullough, William H.; Jansen, Marius B.; Shively, Donald Howard; Kanai, Madoka; Yamamura, Kozo (1988). The Cambridge History of Japan. New York, NY: Cambridge University Press. p. 341. ISBN 978-0-521-22355-3.
- John Whitney Hall (1991). The Cambridge History of Japan Volume 4. Cambridge University Press. pp. 341–42, 348. ISBN 978-0-521-22355-3.
- Kuwata Kazuaki (2016). 戦国時代の筑前国宗像氏 [Munakata clan of Chikuzen Province during the Sengoku period]. 図書出版 花乱社. ISBN 978-4-905327-60-8.
- Masato Fujino (2011). "城郭から見た宗像の戦国時代" [Munakata's Warring States Period seen from the castle]. むなかた電子博物館紀要 第３号 (in Japanese). 5: 豊前覚書 /Buzen Memorandum. Munakata Digital Musium.
- Nakano Anai (2012). 中野等、穴井綾香 著、柳川市史編集委員会 編『柳川の歴史4 (in Japanese). 柳川市.
- Nishizu Hiromi (1998). Honō no gunsen Tachibana Dōsetsu 炎の軍扇立花道雪. (Tokyo: Sōbunsha)
- Turnbull, Stephen (1998). The Samurai Sourcebook. Cassell & Co. ISBN 1854095234.
- Stephen Turnbull (2003). Samurai: The World of the Warrior. Osprey Publishing. ISBN 978-1841767406.
- Yano Kazutada (1926). 筑後国史 : 原名・筑後将士軍談 上巻 (in Japanese). 筑後遺籍刊行会.
- Kazutada, Yano (1926). 『筑後将士軍談』 卷之第十四 高橋紹運取返米山付統虎初陣石垣山合戦 ["Military Tales of the Chikugo Shoguns" Volume 14: Takahashi Shouun's Return to Yoneyama and Tora's First Battle at Ishigakiyama] (in Japanese). 筑後遺籍刊行会.
- 柳川市史編集委員会編, ed. (1997). 柳川歴史資料集成第2集 柳河藩享保八年藩士系図･下 [Yanagawa Historical Materials Collection Vol. 2 Yanagawa domain Kyoho 8th year feudal samurai genealogy, Part 2] (in Japanese). Yanagawa City.
- Yoshiaki Kusudo (2009). 戦国名将・智将・梟将の至言. 学研M文庫. 学習研究社. ISBN 978-4-05-901239-9.
- Yoshinaga, Masaharu (1977). 筑前戦国史 [Chikuzen Sengoku History]. 葦書房.ASIN B000J8REN4
- Yoshinaga Masaharu (2009). 筑前戦国史 [Chikuzen Sengoku History] (in Japanese). 海鳥. ISBN 9784874157398.

== External biography ==
- コロコロさん (2021). "「立花道雪」生涯無敗の大友家宿老、雷神を切った戦国武将！" ["Tachibana Dosetsu" The undefeated Otomo family innkeeper, the Sengoku warlord who killed the god of thunder!]. sengoku-his.com (in Japanese). Containing excerpts from:
  - Muneaki Tachibana (2006). "立花家十七代が語る立花宗茂と柳川" [The 17th generation of the Tachibana family talks about Muneshige Tachibana and Yanagawa]. muneshige.com (in Japanese). Muneaki Tachibana.
  - Sunao Kawaguchi (川口素生) (2006). 戦国名軍師列伝 (in Japanese). PHP研究所.
  - Yoshiaki Kusudo (2006). 戦国武将名言録 [Sengoku Samurai Quotes] (in Japanese). PHP研究所.
- 戦国戸次氏年表
- 井樓纂聞 梅岳公遺事

| Preceded by Tachibana Akitoshi | Tachibana family head 1570–1575 | Succeeded by Tachibana Ginchiyo |
