= Satsuo =

- Gender: Male

Origin
- Origin: Japanese
- Meaning: Different meanings depending on the kanji used

Satsuo (written: 薩夫, 察男 or 左都夫) is a masculine Japanese given name. Notable people with the name include:

- Akizuki Satsuo (秋月 左都夫; 1858–1945), Japanese diplomat
- Satsuo Iwashita (岩下 察男; born 1941), Japanese long-distance runner
- Satsuo Yamamoto (山本 薩夫; 1910–1983), Japanese film director
