= Kakeda =

Kakeda may refer to:

- Kakeda, Fukushima, Japan, a town that was absorbed into the town of Ryōzen which was subsequently absorbed into the city of Date
- Kakeda Toshimune (died 1648), Japanese samurai
