= Akai (name) =

Akai is the name of:

- Shuichi Akai (赤井 秀一), a fictional character in the manga series Case Closed
- Shuichi Akai (footballer) (赤井 秀一, born 1981), Japanese former footballer
- Takami Akai (赤井 孝美, born 1961), Japanese illustrator, game creator, character designer and animator
- Saki Akai (赤井 沙希, born 1987), Japanese professional wrestler
- Hideyuki Akai (赤井 秀行, born 1985), Japanese footballer
- Akai Teruko (赤井 輝子, 1514–1594), Japanese Onna-musha warrior
- Akai Terukage (赤井 照景, 1548–1573), Japanese samurai
- Akai Gurley (c. 1986–2014), African-American man shot and killed by a New York City Police officer
- Akai Osei (born 1999), British actor, dancer and musician, winner of the first series of Got to Dance
