= Tachibana Muneshige =

Samurai

- 立花 宗茂
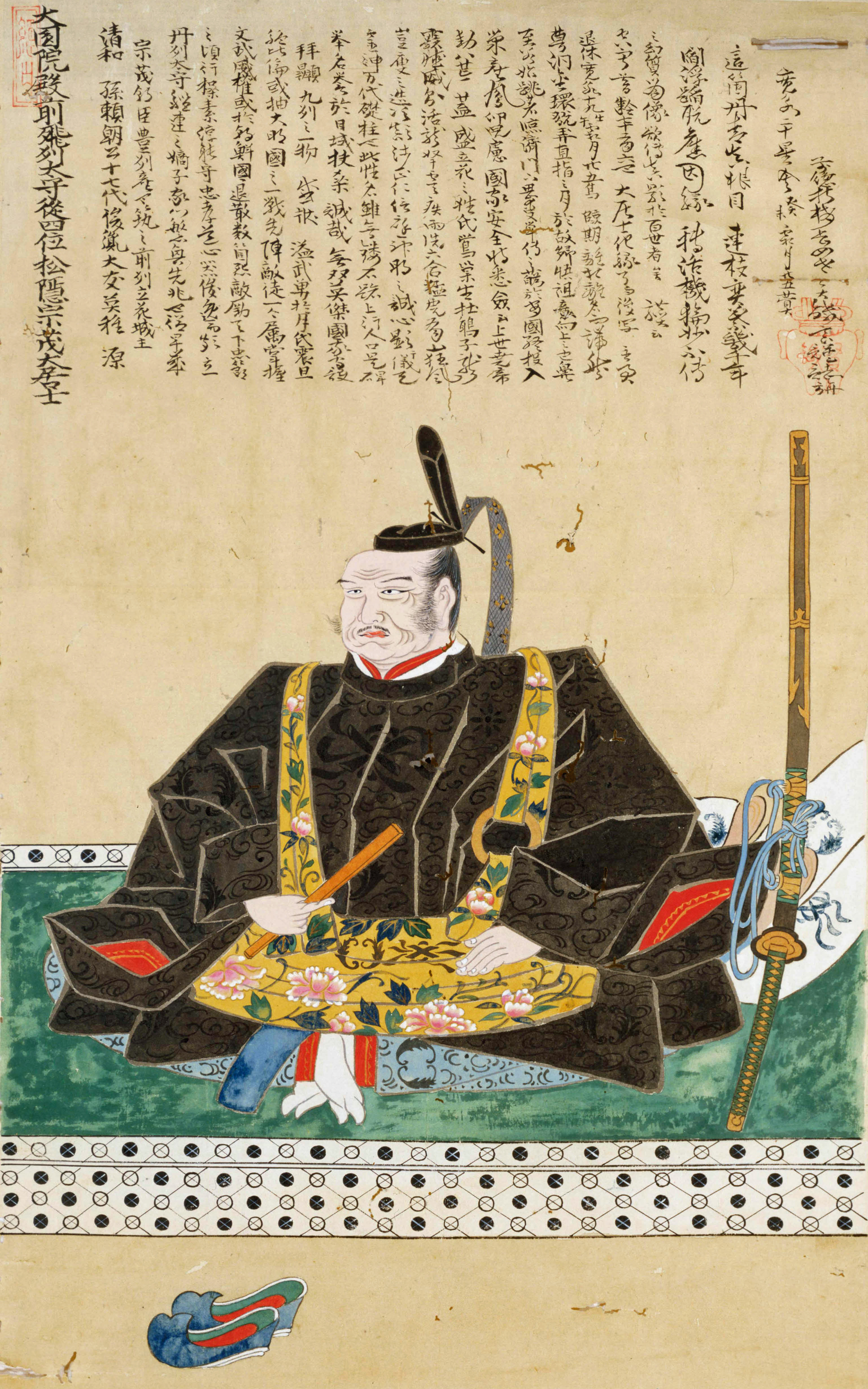

Head of Tachibana clan
- In office 1581–1643
- Preceded by: Tachibana Ginchiyo
- Succeeded by: Tachibana Tadashige

Lord of Tanagura
- In office 1606–1620
- Succeeded by: Niwa Nagashige

Lord of Yanagawa
- In office (1587-1600) – (1620-1638)
- Preceded by: Tanaka Tadamasa
- Succeeded by: Tachibana Tadashige

Personal details
- Born: Senkumamaru (千熊丸); December 18, 1567 Bungo Province
- Died: November 15, 1643 (aged 75)
- Spouse: Tachibana Ginchiyo
- Parent: Takahashi Shigetane (father)
- Relatives: Tachibana Dōsetsu (father-in-law)
- Other name: Tachibana Munetora (立花宗虎 or 立花統虎)

Military service
- Allegiance: Tachibana clan Ōtomo clan Toyotomi clan Western Army; Tokugawa shogunate
- Unit: Takahashi clan Tachibana clan
- Commands: Yanagawa castle
- Battles/wars: Battle of Dazaifu; Battle of Haratsuru; Battle of Iwato; Amakusa Rebellion; Kyūshū Campaign; Siege of Odawara; Korean Campaign; Siege of Ōtsu; Siege of Yanagawa; Siege of Osaka; Shimabara Rebellion

Tachibana Muneshige (立花 宗茂; December 18, 1567 – November 15, 1643) was a Japanese samurai and daimyo in the Azuchi–Momoyama period and the Edo period. He served as the daimyo of the Yanagawa Domain from 1587 to 1600, and again from 1620 to 1638, and as the daimyo of the Tanagura Domain from 1606 to 1620. In addition, he was the head of the Tachibana clan.

== Biography ==
Tachibana Muneshige was born as Senkumamaru (千熊丸) on 18 December 1567 in the Bungo Province of Japan. He was the son of a senior retainer named Takahashi Shigetane of the Ōtomo clan and was adopted by Tachibana Dōsetsu of the Tachibana clan. Muneshige later married Dōsetsu's daughter Tachibana Ginchiyo, before he succeeded Dōsetsu as head of the Tachibana clan.

On July 27, 1581, Dōsetsu and Shigetane fought against Tsukushi Hirokado and Akizuki Tanezane in the second Battle of Dazaifu at Kanzeon-ji. It was this event where Muneshige saw his first notable action in battle.

On November 6, Dōsetsu marched to Kama and Honami alongside Muneshige and Shigetane. While on their way to rescue Kutami Akiyasu, Tachibana and Takahashi decided to turn back after receiving information that Akiyasu had safely retreated after fighting Akizuki Tanezane and Monjūjo Munekage in the Battle of Haratsuru. However, Tanezane's forces were still pursuing them. The fierce fighting resulted in over 1,000 casualties, including more than 300 among the Tachibana–Takahashi forces and 760 for the Akizuki clan. (Note: ^ The Tachibana side referred to this battle as the Battle of Junnohara (also called the Third Battle of Kama and Honami, the Battle of Junnohara, or the Second Battle of Yagiyama-Ishizaka (a battle that took place at the Dainichi-ji entrance on the Yagiyama Ishizaka road in Honami County, a different battle from the Second Battle of Dazaifu Kanzeonji and the Second Battle of Dazaifu Ishizaka in Ishizaka, Dazaifu City on July 27 of the same year)), while the Akizuki side referred to it as the Battle of Yagiyama.)

On April 16, 1582, during the Battle of Iwato against a combined force of 2,000 from the Akizuki, Harada, and Munakata clans, Dōsetsu commanded 500 troops as an ambush force together with 1,000 troops in the main force. 300 of Muneshige's troops launched a surprise attack from the flank with guns, while the remaining 200 soldiers were led by Komono Masutoki, who set up a false flag to make it appear that reinforcements from the Ōtomo clan were arriving, ultimately lifting the siege. Muneshige then led 1,000 cavalry, eliminating 300 of the Harada general's troops, who had built a fort at Iwatosho Kubeno, killing 150 of them and pursuing the rest west to Sawara County, where he burned down Harada Chikahide's Sawara Castle.

On March 17, 1583, he killed Yoshiwara Sadayasu in the Battle of Yoshiwaraguchi. Then, on April 23 he captured Munakata Ujisada's castles, Konomiyama Castle and Ryutoku Castle in Suginami, forcing them to surrender.

In 1587, after the Tachibana clan sided with Toyotomi Hideyoshi during his conquest of Kyushu, Muneshige separated from the Ōtomo and became a daimyō in his own right. He was given Yanagawa Castle in Chikugo Province, therefore making the Tachibana an independent clan. Later, Muneshige was involved in suppressing rebels in Amakusa. During this campaign, the famous Tokugawa clan warrior Mizuno Katsunari served under Muneshige.

Muneshige received licenses in the Hekiryu school of archery from Omura Tsuneyoshi in 1590, Nakae Shinpachi in October 1601, and Yoshida Shigetake in 1602.

=== Invasion of the Korean Peninsula ===
In 1592, during the first Japanese invasions of Korea, Muneshige served in the 6th Division, commanded by Kobayakawa Takakage, commanding 2,500 men. (Note: The commonly cited number of soldiers in the Tachibana army is 3,000. However, based on the family's pre-war kokudaka of 90,887 koku, the actual figure was 2,500. Feudal lords often dispatched fewer troops than required. For instance, Tachibana Muneshige led only 1,500 during the first sea crossing ("Memorandum of the Participant Tottori Jirobē-no-jō" in Addenda 〔5〕 of Volume 1 of the Yanagawa Han Sōsho). Thus, the Tachibana army likely had fewer than 2,500 soldiers, not 3,000.)

During the Siege of Dongnae in April, Muneshige's forces captured Dongnae Fortress. On June 26, at the request of Ukita Hideie, he used fire and ambush tactics to drive the Joseon army north of Hanseong.

In 1593, Muneshige and Takahashi Noriyoshi served in the vanguard during the Battle of Byeokjegwan.

On January 26, around 2:00 a.m., Muneshige sent his officers Morishita Tsuyoshi and Totoki Koreyoshi to lead 30 soldiers on a reconnaissance mission. Then, around 6:00 a.m., Muneshige deployed two columns of 500 soldiers each, with Toki Koremichi and Uchida Noriyoshi as commanders. Muneshige deliberately sent such small units to lure the 2,000 troops in the Ming army led by General Sadaiju. His tactic succeeded, and the Ming army pursued them. As the two columns of Muneshige's soldiers engaged the Ming army in melee, Muneshige instructed his concealed musketeer corps to unleash a volley barrage. As a result, the Ming army suffered heavy losses and fled the battlefield.

Later, Muneshige's main force of 2,000 men advanced north, with Koremichi leading the vanguard and Ono Shigeyuki and Yonetabe Shigehisa commanding 700 men. Around 11 a.m., they arrived in hilly terrain, where they prepared to ambush the enemy. As Takakage Kobayakawa's vanguard—Kageo Awaya and Kagemasa Inoue—held back the Ming and Joseon forces at Goyohara, the attackers seized the moment: each soldier carried three flags, reversing the previous morning's display to deceive the enemy into perceiving a vast army. The advance was then led by Shigeie Tachibana.

During the second Japanese invasion of Korea in 1597, Muneshige was not incorporated into the invading army but was ordered to defend Busan. Later, there was a change in operational plans: Mori Yoshinari was assigned to the defense of Busan, while Muneshige was assigned to the defense of the Japanese castles at Goseong and Angolpo. In the subsequent First Battle of Ulsan Castle, he was in charge of defending Goseong Japanese castle.

=== Sekigahara war ===
In 1600, during the Sekigahara campaign, he sided with the Western Army. According to one historical record from Chikugo Province, Tachibana Muneshige was once advised to side with the Eastern Army, on the grounds that the Western Army had no chance of winning. However, Muneshige replied that he did not care about winning or losing.

Muneshige managed to force the Eastern Army warlord Kyōgoku Takatsugu to surrender in the Siege of Ōtsu. However, after learning that the Western Army had been annihilated in the Battle of Sekigahara, he returned to Osaka Castle. At first, Muneshige urged Mōri Terumoto to prepare resistance against the Eastern Army in Osaka Castle. However, Terumoto did not want to resist the Eastern Army, and instead submitted to Tokugawa Ieyasu as he marched to Osaka Castle.

Later, Muneshige returned to Chikugo Province and surrendered to Tokugawa. Muneshige was under the assumption that he could switch sides and aid forces loyal to Tokugawa against the Shimazu clan of Satsuma. After the Battle of Sekigahara, he was deprived of the Yanagawa Domain as punishment by Tokugawa Ieyasu.

=== After Sekigahara ===
In 1603, Muneshige went to Edo and with the help of Honda Tadakatsu, and began living in seclusion at the Hosshō-ji Temple in Takada. In 1604, he was summoned to Edo Castle on Tadakatsu's recommendation. Shogun Tokugawa Ieyasu, who knew Muneshige's abilities well, awarded him 5,000 koku as the shogunate's Goinbanto (head of the shogun's personal guards). Soon after, he was selected as one of the attendants of Ieyasu's eldest son, Tokugawa Hidetada, and in 1606 he was granted 10,000 koku in Mutsu Tanagura (Nango), returning to the status of daimyō. At this time, he changed his name from Naomasa to Toshimasa.

In 1614, he participated in the Siege of Osaka as a military adviser to the second shogun, Tokugawa Hidetada, serving as his strategist and overseeing the defense of the area. Muneshige correctly predicted the movements of the Toyotomi general Ono Harufusa's troops and guided Hidetada's forces.

After the campaign against Toyotomi Hideyori ended in 1615, he was restored to his former territory in Yanagawa. Muneshige was the only defeated general from the Battle of Sekigahara who was allowed to return to his former domain.

In 1637, Muneshige served in the shogunate army during the Shimabara Rebellion (1637–1638), a revolt involving mostly Japanese peasants, many of whom were Catholics.

== Appearance ==
His height, estimated from his armor, was about 180 centimetres (71 in). It has also been suggested from stories about Honda Tadakatsu that Muneshige was tall and rode a large horse.

== Muneshige in popular culture ==
See People of the Sengoku period in popular culture.

== Honours ==
- Junior Third Rank (November 10, 1915; posthumous)

== Appendix ==
=== Bibliography ===
- Alessandro Valignano (1954). Luis Alvarez-Taladriz, José (ed.). Sumario de las cosas de Japón (1583) Adiciones del Sumario de Japón (1592) · Volume 1 (in Spanish). Sophia University. pp. 114–6.
- Masato Fujino (2011). "城郭から見た宗像の戦国時代" [Munakata's Warring States Period seen from the castle]. むなかた電子博物館紀要 第３号 (in Japanese). 5: 豊前覚書 /Buzen Memorandum. Munakata Digital Musium.
- Stephen Turnbull (2003). Samurai: The World of the Warrior. Osprey Publishing. ISBN 978-1841767406.
- Yano Kazutada (1926). 筑後国史 : 原名・筑後将士軍談 上巻 (in Japanese). 筑後遺籍刊行会. p. 190.
- Kazutada, Yano (1926). 『筑後将士軍談』 卷之第十四 高橋紹運取返米山付統虎初陣石垣山合戦 ["Military Tales of the Chikugo Shoguns" Volume 14: Takahashi Shouun's Return to Yoneyama and Tora's First Battle at Ishigakiyama] (in Japanese). 筑後遺籍刊行会.
- Yoshiaki Kusudo (2009). 戦国名将・智将・梟将の至言. 学研M文庫. 学習研究社. ISBN 978-4-05-901239-9.
- Yoshinaga, Masaharu (1977). 筑前戦国史 [Chikuzen Sengoku History]. 葦書房.ASIN B000J8REN4
- Yoshinaga Masaharu (2009). 筑前戦国史 [Chikuzen Sengoku History] (in Japanese). 海鳥. ISBN 9784874157398.
- Nakano Anai (2012). 中野等、穴井綾香 著、柳川市史編集委員会 編『柳川の歴史4 (in Japanese). 柳川市.
- Banri Hoashi (1835). 国書データベース: 井樓纂聞 梅岳公遺事 [Kokusho Sōmokuroku: Seirousanbun: The Iji of Lord Baigaku] (in Japanese). Niigata University Library.
- Genjō Sanjin. Kyūshū sengokushi: Bekki gundan. Tōkyō: Rekishi Toshosha, 1978. OCLC 70792159
- Kawamura, Tetsuo. Tachibana Muneshige. Fukuoka-shi: Nishi Nihon Shinbunsha, 1999. ISBN 4816704884 OCLC 44470864
- Nakano, Hitoshi. Tachibana Muneshige. Tōkyō: Yoshikawa Kōbunkan, 2001. ISBN 4642052208 OCLC 46390748
- Tachibana, Muneshige, and Tōun Hasegawa. Ehon hōkan. Setsuyō [Osaka]: Kankidō Shigeyuki, 1688. OCLC 26843338

Preceded by Tachibana Ginchiyo	Tachibana family head 1581–1637	Succeeded by Tachibana Tadashige
