= Akizuki Tanenaga =

- 秋月 種長

Head of Akizuki clan
- In office 1596–1614
- Preceded by: Akizuki Tanezane
- Succeeded by: Akizuki Taneharu

Personal details
- Born: March 17, 1567
- Died: July 19, 1614 (aged 47)
- Children: Akizuki Taneharu

Military service
- Allegiance: Shimazu clan Toyotomi clan Tokugawa shogunate
- Rank: Daimyo
- Unit: Akizuki clan
- Commands: Takanabe Domain
- Battles/wars: Kyushu Campaign (1587); Korean Campaign (1598); Sekigahara Campaign (1600)

Akizuki Tanenaga (秋月 種長; March 17, 1567 – July 19, 1614) was a Japanese samurai warrior and daimyō of the late Sengoku and early Edo periods. He was the son of Akizuki Tanezane.

In 1586, Tanenaga joined with his father to fight against Toyotomi Hideyoshi forces during the Kyūshū campaign

In 1598, Tanenaga made contributions at the Siege of Ulsan castle against the allied Chinese and Korean armies. During the Korean campaign, Tanenaga served under Kuroda Nagamasa.

In 1600, in the Battle of Sekigahara, Tanenaga defended Ōgaki Castle on behalf of the "Western Army". However, soon after the Western Army suffered defeat, Mizuno Katsunari convinced Tanenaga to switch allegiance to the Eastern Army. Tokugawa Ieyasu rewarded Tanenaga by recognizing his territory and enabling him to become the first head of Takanabe Domain in Hyūga Province on the island of Kyushu.

Tanenaga did not have a son so he adopted, Akizuki Taneharu, the son of Tanesada (his son in law also his first cousin who supposedly succeeded him but disinherited due to poor health) and Ochō (his daughter), was appointed as Tanenaga’s successor. Tanenaga died in 1614 and Taneharu inherited the clan.

Preceded by None	Daimyō of Takanabe; 1587–1614	Succeeded by Akizuki Taneharu
