= Tachibana Ginchiyo =

Japanese samurai (1569–1602)

Tachibana Ginchiyo 立花 誾千代
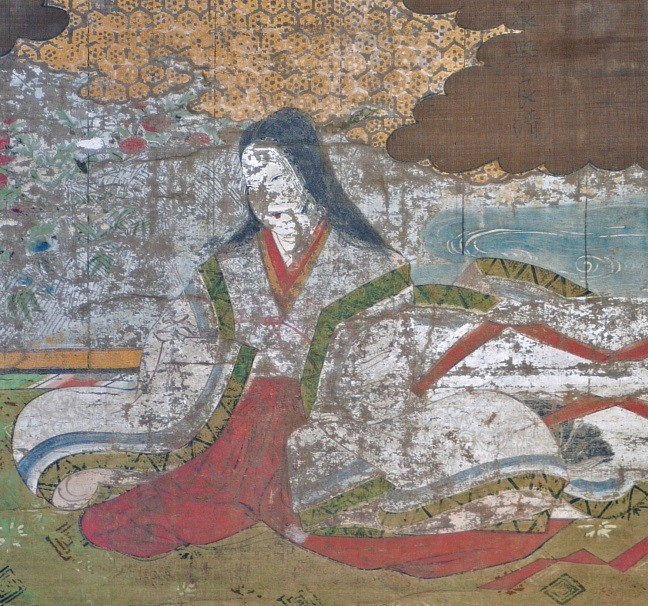

Head of Tachibana clan
- In office 1575–1581
- Preceded by: Tachibana Dōsetsu
- Succeeded by: Tachibana Muneshige

Personal details
- Born: Tachibana Castle, Chikuzen Province, Japan
- Died: Yanagawa, Fukuoka Hizen Province, Japan
- Spouse: Tachibana Muneshige
- Parents: Tachibana Dōsetsu (father); a daughter of Monchūsho Akitoyo (mother)

Military service
- Allegiance: Ōtomo clan Toyotomi clan Western Army; Katō clan
- Unit: Tachibana clan
- Commands: Tachibanayama Castle
- Battles/wars: Kyūshū Campaign (1587); Siege of Yanagawa (1600)

Tachibana Ginchiyo (立花 誾千代; September 23, 1569 – November 30, 1602) was head of the Japanese Tachibana clan and onna-musha during the Sengoku period. She was a daughter of Tachibana Dōsetsu, a powerful retainer of the Ōtomo clan (which were rivals of the Shimazu clan at the time). Because Dosetsu had no sons, he requested that Ginchiyo be made family head.

== Biography ==
Tachibana Ginchiyo was the daughter of Tachibana Dōsetsu, a powerful samurai known as "Lightning God". Her mother was the daughter of Monchūsho Akitoyo(問注所鑑豊). Her mother and her former husband Yasutake Shigenori(安武鎮則) had a son Yasutake Moan(安武茂庵) and a daughter who married Netami Shigehisa(米谷比鎮久). According to one source, the chronicle of Komono clan, Dōsetsu had another daughter, Masachiyo(政千代) who died at 12 years old. The letter "誾" in Ginchiyo's name was named by Masugin, a monk in Hizen province. Ginchiyo was personally named by her father, with the name more or less meaning "one who would not listen idly to others". There are many speculations about Ginchiyo's personality, but according to some reports from Otomo Family Document (大友家文書録), it is said that she was a severe and rigid figure, a valiant woman, with remarkable communication skills, as strong and determined as any famous warrior of the time. When Dōsetsu was ill and lost his other children, he was pleased that Ginchiyo had survived. Despite their suggestion to pass his leadership on to one of his distant relatives, he told his retainers that Ginchiyo would be his heiress after his death. She inherited her father's territory and belongings.

Princess Ginchiyo became the castellan of Tachibana Castle and the head of the Tachibana clan at 7 years old. She married Takahashi Shoun's (高橋紹運) eldest son, Tachibana Muneshige (立花宗茂) at the age of 13. At the age of 19, she entered Yanagawa Castle and lived a happy life as the wife of a feudal lord, but at the age of 27, due to the lack of children, Muneshige began taking concubines. She was a model samurai woman of the Warring States Period. Wishing to preserve the family line, and out of consideration for Muneshige, she decided to live separately from his concubine. At age 32, despite Ginchiyo's advice, her husband joined forces with the Toyotomi clan (Western Army) at the Battle of Sekigahara and was defeated. As a result, Muneshige's territory and castle were taken away and the couple were sent to live with Muneshige's mother in Haraaka Village, Tamana County (Nagasu Town), under the protection of Kato Kiyomasa. Two years later, Ginchiyo died of illness. She was 34 years old and given the posthumous Buddhist name "Koushoinden Senyo Ryosei Daizenjoni." She died without seeing Muneshige's return to daimyo status.

Tachibana Ginchiyo is enshrined as a god of compassion at Mihashira Shrine 三柱神社 located northeast of Yanagawa Castle alongside her father, Tachibana Dosetsu, and her husband, Muneshige.

== Kyushu Campaign ==
In 1586 the Shimazu clan marched with his troops to conquer Kyushu, attacked the Ōtomo clan in the Bungo province and the Tachibana Castle in the north. The Tachibana clan fought back against Shimazu. In Otomo Family Document (大友家文書録), describes that when the commanders of the Shimazu army arrived near Tachibana castle, Ginchiyo armed the women with firearms and defended the castle gates.

When Toyotomi Hideyoshi led 200,000 men to conquer Kyushu, the Shimazu army retreated to the Higo Province. The Tachibana forces were eventually forced to flee during the Kyūshū Campaign. Tachibana castle fell to Hideyoshi, who entrusted it to Kobayakawa Takakage. Ginchiyo and Muneshige allied with Hideyoshi in the campaign against their traditional rival, Shimazu clan.

== Service under Hideyoshi ==
After the Tachibana clan siding with Toyotomi Hideyoshi and he had conquered Kyushu in 1587, Muneshige split from the Ōtomo to become a daimyō in his own right. He was given Yanagawa castle in Chikugo province, and after this the Tachibana became an independent clan. It is said that Ginchiyo and Muneshige did not like each other; she opposed the change of domain and many other policies of Muneshige. Even after transferring clan leadership to Muneshige, she still had much political influence.

After the Kyushu campaign, Hideyoshi is said to return Tachibana Castle to Ginchiyo. She lived separately from Muneshige, who stayed at Yanagawa Castle. When Muneshige was absent, Ginchiyo was responsible for managing the Tachibana clan domains and commanding Yanagawa Castle. The Tachibana clan fought in the Siege of Odawara, the battle that unified Japan, under Hideyoshi's name.

In 1592, Hideyoshi ordered that Tachibana Muneshige and Tachibana Naotsugu participate of the Invasion to the Korea under the command of Kobayakawa Takakage. Hideyoshi built Nagoya castle as a base to launch attacks on Korea. The castle was relatively close to Ginchiyo's residence in Hizen Province. It is said during the Korean Campaign, while Toyotomi Hideyoshi was stationed at Nagoya Castle in Hizen, he summoned Tachibana Ginchiyo for an audience. Renowned as Kyushu’s most brilliant and formidable noblewoman, she impressed Hideyoshi with her sharp wit and fearless demeanor. “Truly, you are the worthy daughter of the great Dōsetsu,” he acknowledged. Yet, some accounts claim that Hideyoshi, plotting treachery, sought to take advantage of her. Sensing his intentions, Ginchiyo arrived at the castle fully armed, her attendants poised with firearms at the ready. Stunned by her defiance, Hideyoshi whether out of fear or reluctant respect found himself unable to act.

After the failure of Hideyoshi's campaign of Korea, Ginchiyo, who never gave birth to a child, divorced Muneshige and became a Buddhist nun.

== Sekigahara Campaign ==
After the death of Toyotomi Hideyoshi, the power of the Toyotomi clan declined, and Japan would go to war again. In 1600, in the Battle of Sekigahara, the Tachibana clan would ally itself with Ishida Mitsunari in the Western army against the Eastern Army of Tokugawa Ieyasu. Ginchiyo first opposed Muneshige's decision to join the Western army.

At the Battle of Sekigahara, Muneshige participated in the attack against Kyōgoku Takatsugu, who was holed-up in Ōtsu Castle in Ōmi Province. The offensive included a total of 15,000 soldiers led by Mōri Motoyasu, Mōri Hidekane, and Tsukushi Hirokado. Muneshige did not, however, join the main Battle of Sekigahara as Takatsugu surrendered on the same day. After learning of the defeat of the Western Army, he advised the commander-in-chief, Mōri Terumoto, to hole-up in Ōsaka Castle, but this was rejected and he returned by sea route to Kyūshū. Early in the tenth month, he entered Yanagawa Castle. Letters of commendation dated 10/10 were given to retainers for their contributions in the Battle of Ōtsu Castle. Ginchiyo led a group of family samurai and servants to meet him.

=== Siege of Yanagawa (1600) ===
Following the Western Army's defeat at Sekigahara, Eastern Army forces under Kuroda Kanbei and Nabeshima Katsushige advanced into Kyushu to eliminate remaining Ōtomo clan resistance.Tachibana Ginchiyo mobilized a defensive force composed of warrior nuns and loyal retainers to protect Yanagawa Domain.

Historical records document two key military actions during this campaign. First, she commanded a musket unit that successfully repelled Nabeshima naval forces attempting river crossings near Yanagawa, establishing fortified positions along strategic waterways. Second, when Kato Kiyomasa's army advanced from the south, he consulted local guides about the route. They warned: "The daughter of Lord Dōsetsu, Lady Ginchiyo, resides in Nishimiyamura Village of Yamato District, and the people there are fiercely loyal to her. Should we take the coastal road through Miyamura, we would face numerous strong spearmen under her command.", Kiyomasa consequently altered his line of advance, choosing the Setaka route instead to avoid confronting Ginchiyo's prepared defenses.

During the subsequent Siege of Yanagawa Castle, Ginchiyo led rearguard actions in full armor while covering Tachibana Muneshige's retreat from advancing Eastern Army forces. Though the castle fell, her defensive operations enabled key Tachibana retainers to escape.

Kuroda and Kato were old comrades-in-arms of Tachibana Muneshige from the days of the Korean invasion, and following the unexpected and challenging resistance of Ginchiyo, they proposed that she and her ex-husband should surrender and join them in a campaign against Shimazu Yoshihiro, who was also from the Western Army and fled from Sekigahara. Muneshige agreed, but Tokugawa Ieyasu ordered the campaign to stop almost before it had begun because he did not want a further war in Kyushu. Ginchiyo and Muneshige were pardoned nonetheless. The Tachibana family was deprived of their domains in the aftermath of Mitsunari's defeat. Muneshige thanked Ginchiyo for helping him in battle and they both went their own way.

== Later life ==
After the battle, she was put under protection of Kiyomasa with other retainers of Tachibana clan. She lived in the residence of Ichizō(市蔵), the local farmer of Tamana, Higo Province. Kiyomasa wrote in his letter that he sent food provisions to Ginchiyo at that time. Polite words of the letter suggests that he treated Ginchiyo as a noble woman.

Tachibana Ginchiyo died of illness on November 30, 1602, only 33 years old. She was buried in Ryōsei Temple in Yanagawa. Her death marked the end of the bloodline of her father, Tachibana Dōsetsu. Ginchiyo’s mother, Nishihime (Hōjuin) resided in the Ichizō home with Ginchiyo. After Ginchiyo’s death, a discussion ensued among relatives whereby Nishihime was then taken to be cared for in a home in Tanba and, in 1616, she died in Higo Province. On the day of mourning for Ginchiyo, invitees included members of the Monjūsho, the Netabi, and the Yasutake (the first family where she went for marriage), the Kido (the go-between for Dōsetsu), the Kongōin (the family for faith in Inari (god of harvest)), the Uda (descendants of the Ichizō in the village of Haraka where Ginchiyo resided and caretakers of her grave). .

== See also ==
- List of female castellans in Japan
- Onna-musha

Preceded by Tachibana Dōsetsu	Tachibana family head 1575–1581	Succeeded by Tachibana Muneshige
