= Takahashi Shigetane =

Japanese samurai lord and senior retainer

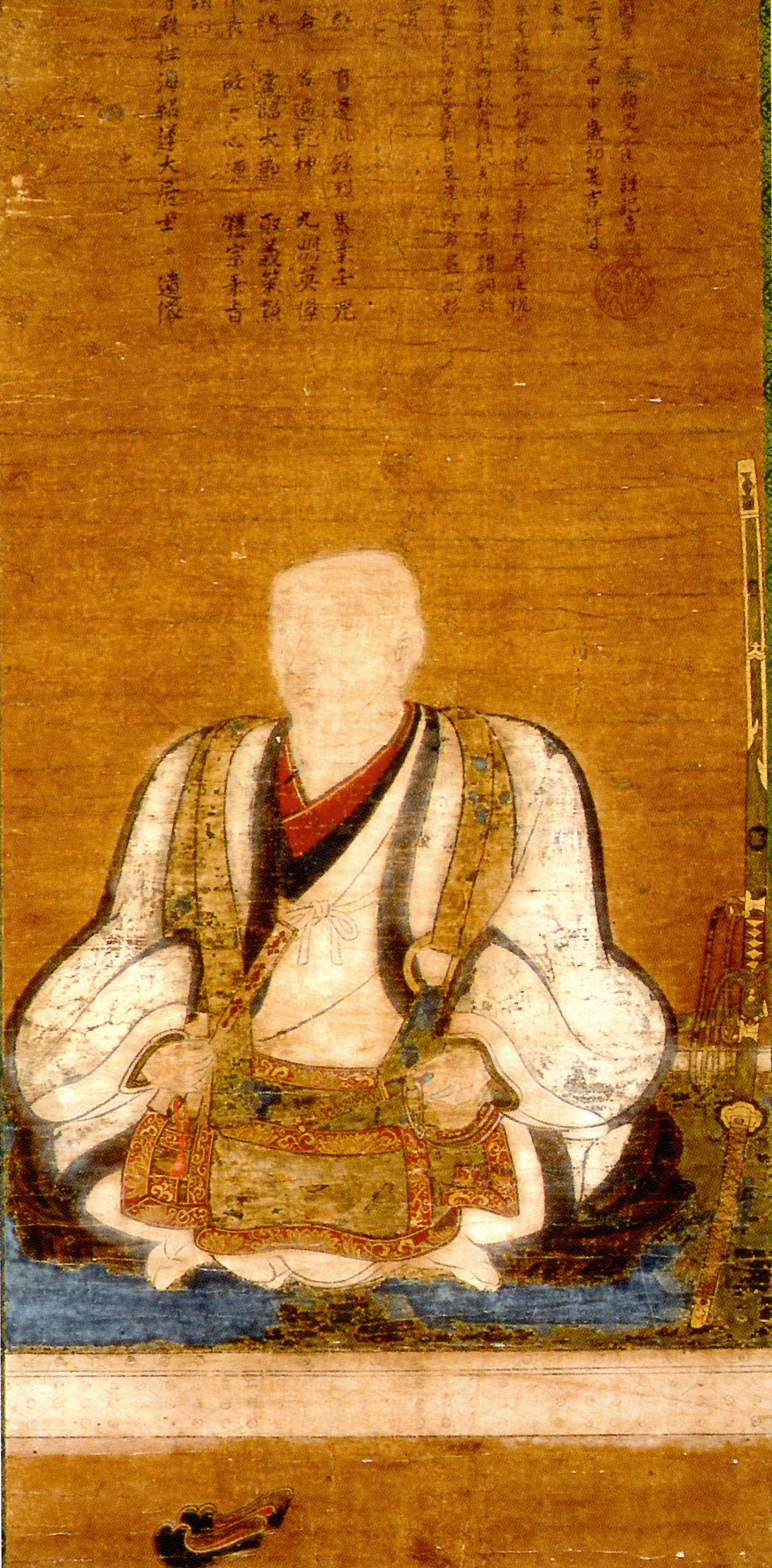
A picture of Takahashi Shigetane

Takahashi Shigetane (高橋 紹運; 1548 – September 10, 1586) also known as Takahashi Shōun (Jōun) (高橋 紹運) was a Japanese samurai lord and senior retainer of the Ōtomo clan throughout the latter Sengoku period. He was the biological father of Tachibana Muneshige.

== Biography ==
Shigetane was additionally known by the name of 'Takahashi Shōun' during the earlier years of his life, he began his service beneath the Ōtomo of Bungo Province around this same initial time, with Ōtomo Sōrin as their leader and head. His father was Yoshihiro Kanari, who was a notable retainer of the Ōtomo clan, while her mother was the daughter of Ōtomo Yoshikane. His sister was Yoshihiro Kikuhime.

Eventually, Shigetane became the respective controller of the Takahashi clan, in which he was additionally regarded as one "Great Pillars" of power to the Otomo clan along with Kamachi Akimori. Shigetane being granted Iwaya Castle that bordered Chikuzen Province in contribution to his authority and prestige.

Contemporary Italian jesuit Alessandro Valignano has recorded that Tachibana Muneshige was adopted as son by Dōsetsu and inherited the Tachibana clan. At first, Shigetane declined. However, Dōsetsu implored him and stating that although he had Ginchiyo as inheritor of his clan, but he needed strong young samurai to lead the Tachibana clan in the future, as he further stated his reason that after his death, he need strong commanders to lead the both Takahashi clan and Tachibana clan to defend the declining Ōtomo clan. As he saw the Takahashi Shigetane potential heirs were many, then he need Muneshige inherit the command of Tachibana. Thus Shigetane finally accepted this reason and agree to give Muneshige for the Tachibana clan. Then, as he secured the adoption, Dōsetsu immediately changed the lordships of Tachibana clan from his daughter, Ginchiyo, to Muneshige.

The powerful Shimazu had conquered the Ryūzōji at Okitanawate in 1584, and by 1586 had set their aim upon the destruction of the Ōtomo, with whom they had a long, intense rivalry. This action forced Shigetane, who was unprepared, to strengthen his Castle defenses.

However, the forces of Shimazu Yoshihisa arrived and launch Siege of Iwaya Castle earlier than the Shigetane initially anticipated, and therefore Shigetane was desperately placed in a dilemma: on one hand he had no more than 763 men, and as the opposition respectively wielded around 35,000 soldiers, no form of defense could be utterly possible, considering that such a mass of military might was additionally set on solely besieging Iwaya castle, as opposed to splitting and assaulting from a different direction. And as the circumstances would naturally have it, Shigetane was overwhelmed relatively immediately, but the forces in Iwaya somehow managed to survive for over two weeks before initially seeing that the situation was far beyond any length of salvation, forcing Shigetane to commit suicide there and then, who was consequently praised by the Shimazu for his bravery and conviction, despite being in a situation that entirely contradicted any means of victory.

During the siege of Iwaya Castle, a commanding officer of the Shimazu stopped his attack and said, "Why do you serve the unjust Ōtomo clan that makes light of Buddhism and has faith in Christianity? Your bravery has already been proven, please surrender." To which he answered: "Swearing allegiance and loyalty to your lord and his clan when he is powerful, and betraying the clan when it is weak. Many a man do that, but I owe a debt of gratitude to my lord and his clan, and therefore I cannot do such a thing. A samurai who is ungrateful is worse than animals." It was said that all men in the battlefield, including Shimazu's soldiers admired him.

In 1585, Shigetane and Tachibana Dōsetsu were involved in a defense against anti Ōtomo alliance massive invasion which led by Ryūzōji Ieharu. This alliance has involved many Ōtomo enemies such as Kusano Chin'ei, Nabeshima Naoshige, Tsukushi Hirokado, Ki Shigefusa (also known as Utsunomiya Chinfusa), Nagano Sukemori, and Goto Ienobu. This alliance were further augmented by Samurai clans from Hizen, Chikuzen, Chikugo, and Buzen, so that they all add up to 30,000 soldiers in strength, while Dōsetsu and Takahashi Shigetane had only 9,800 soldiers under their commands. The alliance has begun their attacks towards Kurume town. In April 23, Dōsetsu and Shigetane engaged the allied forces with the combination of skillful artillery salvos, defensive formation tactics, and timely counterattacks, which in the end caused the allied siege collapsed.

His son Muneshige later was adopted to the Tachibana clan and succeeded Shigetane's daughter-in-law Tachibana Ginchiyo as the head of the clan.

== Appendix ==
=== Bibliography ===
- Alessandro Valignano (1954). Luis Alvarez-Taladriz, José (ed.). Sumario de las cosas de Japón (1583) Adiciones del Sumario de Japón (1592) · Volume 1 (in Spanish). Sophia University. pp. 114–6.
- Nakano Anai (2012). 中野等、穴井綾香 著、柳川市史編集委員会 編『柳川の歴史4 (in Japanese). 柳川市.
- Yoshinaga, Masaharu (1977). 筑前戦国史 [Chikuzen Sengoku History]. 葦書房.ASIN B000J8REN4
- Takahashi Shigetane - SamuraiWiki. (Samurai Archives) FWSeal & CEWest, 2005
- Siege of Iwaya - SamuraiWiki. (Samurai Archives) FWSeal & CEWest, 2005
- 吉永 正春 (2009). 筑前戦国史 増補改訂版 (in Japanese). 海鳥. ASIN 4874157394.
