= Yamada Arinobu =

Vassal of the Shimazu clan (1544-1609)

- Born: 1544
- Died: June 15, 1609 (aged 64–65)
- Military career
- Allegiance: Shimazu clan
- Rank: Karō
- Commands: Takajo castle
- Conflicts: Siege of Takabaru (1576); Battle of Mimigawa (1578); Siege of Horikiri (1585); Siege of Iwaya Castle (1585); Siege of Tachibana (1586); Kyūshū campaign (1587)

Yamada Arinobu (山田 有信; 1544 – June 15, 1609) was a retainer of the Shimazu clan during the Sengoku period. He served under Shimazu Yoshihisa. On 1568, he became a Karō for his services.

He was known as a skilled commander in battle. On 1578, Ōtomo Yoshishige attacked the Shimazu clan and Arinobu gathered 500 troops to hold ground at Takajo Castle. In the Battle of Mimigawa that followed, the Shimazu army defeated the Otomo who retreated under heavy losses. The Otomo losses included commanders like Kamachi Akimori, from which it never recovered.

In 1585, he fought in the attack of Horikiri castle at Chikugo Province and later in the Siege of Iwaya Castle resulted after the Shimazu invasion of Chikuzen Province.

In 1587, when Toyotomi Hideyoshi launched the invasion of Kyūshū at Shimazu clan territory, Arinobu again gathered a handful of troops to take a defensive stand after the main body of the army led by Shimazu Yoshihisa had lost. Refusing to surrender to Toyotomi's troops, Arinobu surrendered only after Yoshihisa ordered him to surrender and offered Toyotomi his son Yamada Arinaga as hostage.

Yamada died in 1609 and it is said that Yoshihisa prayed in front of his coffin, thanking him for his long service.
