= Japanese destroyer Akizuki =

Three Japanese destroyers have been named Akizuki:

- Japanese destroyer Akizuki (1941), an Akizuki-class destroyer launched in 1941 and sunk in 1944
- JDS Akizuki, an Akizuki-class destroyer launched in 1959 and stricken in 1993
- JS Akizuki, an Akizuki-class destroyer launched in 2010
