= Akizuki Satsuo =

Japanese diplomat (1858–1945)

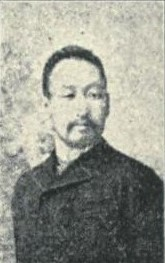
- Satsuo as ambassador to Hungary in 1910
- Born: 秋月 左都夫; February 24, 1858; Hyūga Province
- Died: June 25, 1945 (aged 87)
- Occupation(s): diplomat, government official

Akizuki Satsuo (秋月 左都夫, February 24, 1858 – June 25, 1945) was a diplomat and government official of the upper third rank (正三位, shōsanmi) in the Imperial Household Ministry. He was born in Hyūga Province.

He was the third of four sons. His father, Akizuki Taneyo (秋月 種節) was an elder of the Takanabe Domain. His younger brother, Suzuki Masaya (鈴木 馬左也), was an official in the Ministry of Agricultural and Trade Affairs, and contributed to the growth of the Sumitomo Zaibatsu. Makino Nobuaki (牧野 伸顕) was his brother-in-law.

He graduated from the Han school called Meirindō (明倫堂) founded by Akizuki Taneshige (秋月 種茂). He attended Kagoshima Medical School, but dropped out. He graduated from the Japanese Ministry of Justice Law School.

He worked in the Ministry of Justice for a time, but then became a diplomat. He worked as a diplomat to Sweden, the Japanese ambassador to Belgium, and the ambassador extraordinary to Austria-Hungary, before leaving office in 1914. He worked as a plenipotentiary advisor at the Paris Peace Conference in 1919.

During his time as ambassador to Belgium, in 1908, he observed a British Boy Scout event. He reported his findings to others, which spread word of the Boy Scout movement to Japan.

He was an editorial advisor for (and later president of) the Asahi Shimbun newspaper, worked as the head of the Keijō Nippō newspaper, and was also deputy leader of the Association for the Accession of the True Emperor in Greater Japan (大日本皇道立教会, Dainippon Honkō Dōritsu Kyōkai). Together with the politician Furushima Kazuo (古島 一雄), he put much effort into the foundation of Sōka Kyoiku Gakkai (創価教育学会), "The Value-Creating Education Society", the former incarnation of Soka Gakkai. He later become the member of the lay organisation and praticising Nichiren Buddhism.
