= Harada Nobutane =

Japanese samurai (1560–1598)

- Born: 1560; Kyūshū, Japan
- Died: 1598 (aged 37–38); Ulsan, Korea
- Occupations: Akizuki clan retainer, Toyotomi clan retainer

Harada Nobutane (原田 信種; 1560–1598) was a Japanese samurai of the Sengoku period through Azuchi–Momoyama period, who served the Akizuki clan of Kyūshū. His court title was Shimotsuke no kami (下野守). He was born to Kusano Chikanaga, but was adopted as heir to the Harada family. He became a vassal of Toyotomi Hideyoshi following Hideyoshi's invasion of Kyūshū; Harada then served as yoriki under Sassa Narimasa and Katō Kiyomasa. He joined Katō Kiyomasa's force in Korea, and died at the Siege of Ulsan.
