= Takanabe Domain =

Administrative division in Japan during the Edo period (1601–1871)

Takanabe Domain 高鍋藩
- Domain of Japan
- 1587–1871
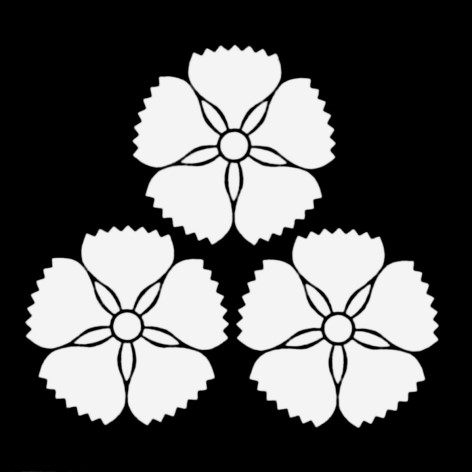
- Mon of the Akizuki clan
- Capital: Takanabe Castle
- Area
  - Coordinates: 32°07′24.82″N 131°30′3.36″E
- Historical era: Edo period
  - Established: 1587
  - Abolition of the han system: 1871
- Contained within
  - Province: Hyuga Province
- Today part of: Miyazaki Prefecture

Location of Takanabe Castle
Takanabe Domain (Japan)

Takanabe Domain (高鍋藩, Takanabe-han) was a feudal domain under the Tokugawa shogunate of Edo period Japan, in what is now central Miyazaki Prefecture. It was centered around Takanabe Castle and was ruled by the tozama daimyō Akizuki clan for all of its history. In its early years, it was called Takarabe Domain (財部藩) after the location of its original seat.

== History ==
The Akizuki clan originally ruled Akizuki in Chikuzen Province, but when Toyotomi Hideyoshi invaded Kyūshū, Akizuki Tanemi sided with the Shimazu clan and resisted, only later submitting to Hideyoshi. As a result, he was deprived of his 300,000 koku territory and demoted to a much smaller 30,000 koku domain in Kushima, Hyūga Province. During the 1600 Battle of Sekigahara, Akizuki Tanenaga sided with the Western Army and was assigned to defend Ōgaki Castle, but when the Western Army was destroyed in the main battle at Sekigahara he quickly defected to the Eastern Army, killing those officers who remained loyal to the Toyotomi cause at Ōgaki Castle and surrendered it to Tokugawa Ieyasu. As a result, he was confirmed in his existing holdings in Kyushu. In 1604, he moved his seat to Takarabe Castle (Takanabe Castle), and this marked the official start of Takanabe Domain under the Tokugawa shogunate. The Akizuki clan ruled Takanabe for ten generations until the Meiji period.

The early history of the domain was difficult due to the tyrannical rule of the local karō Shirai Tanemori and his son Taneshige. Finances were so tight that the maximum stipend for retainers was set to be no more than 300 koku. The third daimyō, Akizuki Tanenobu resolved the problems caused by the Shirai and also worked to restore the domain's worsening finances. Particular emphasis was placed on horse ranching, for both military cavalry and for transportation. Furthermore, Akizuki Tanenobu constructed a moat and rebuilt the gates and daimyo palace at his castle, changing its name from "Takarabe" to "Takanabe" in 1673. The fourth daimyō, Akizuki Tanemasa, distributed 3,000 koku to his younger brother, Tanefu, in 1689, and the domain was thereafter ranked at 27,000 koku. In the middle of the Edo period, the second son of the 6th daimyō, Akizuki Tanemi succeeded to Yonezawa Domain and became the famous Uesugi Harunori; his older brother, the Akizuki Taneshige became 7th daimyō of Takanabe and opened the han school "Meirindo" in 1778. Takanabe became noted for its high level of education and the large number of samurai who had attended its academy.

The domain played little role in the Meiji restoration and became Takanabe Prefecture in 1871 with the abolition of the han system. Afterwards it passed through "Mimitsu Prefecture", which was briefly joined to Kagoshima Prefecture, before becoming part of Miyazaki Prefecture. The Akizuki clan was elevated to kazoku peerage in 1884 with the title of viscount.

== Holdings at the end of the Edo period ==
As with most domains in the han system, Akizuki Domain consisted of several discontinuous territories calculated to provide the assigned kokudaka, based on periodic cadastral surveys and projected agricultural yields, g.

- Hyūga Province
  - 1 village in Usuki District
  - 18 villages in Naka District
  - 33 villages in Koyu District
  - 1 village in Miyazaki District
  - 7 villages in Morokata District

== List of daimyō ==
#	Name	Tenure	Courtesy title	Court Rank	kokudaka
Akizuki clan, 1587-1871 (Tozama)
1	Akizuki Tanenaga (秋月種長)	1587–1614	Nagato-no-kami (長門守)	Junior 5th Rank, Lower Grade (従五位下)	30,000 koku
2	Akizuki Taneharu (秋月種春)	1614–1659	Nagato-no-kami (長門守)	Junior 5th Rank, Lower Grade (従五位下)	30,000 koku
3	Akizuki Tanenobu (秋月種信)	1659–1689	Sado-no-kami (佐渡守)	Junior 5th Rank, Lower Grade (従五位下)	30,000 koku
4	Akizuki Tanemasa (秋月種政)	1689–1710	Nagato-no-kami (長門守)	Junior 5th Rank, Lower Grade (従五位下)	30,000 --> 27,000 koku
5	Akizuki Tanehiro (秋月種弘)	1710–1734	Nagato-no-kami (長門守)	Junior 5th Rank, Lower Grade (従五位下)	27,000 koku
6	Akizuki Tanemitsu (秋月種美)	1734–1760	Nagato-no-kami (長門守)	Junior 5th Rank, Lower Grade (従五位下)	27,000 koku
7	Akizuki Taneshige (秋月種茂)	1760–1788	Sado-no-kami (佐渡守)	Junior 5th Rank, Lower Grade (従五位下)	27,000 koku
8	Akizuki Tanenori (秋月種徳)	1788–1807	Yamashiro-no-kami (山城守)	Junior 5th Rank, Lower Grade (従五位下)	27,000 koku
9	Akizuki Tanetada (秋月種任)	1807–1871	Chizuken-no-kami (筑前守)	Junior 5th Rank, Lower Grade (従五位下)	27,000 koku

== See also ==
- List of Han
- Abolition of the han system
