= Akai Terukage =

Japanese samurai

- Born: 1548
- Died: 1573 (aged 24–25)
- Era: Sengoku

Akai Terukage (赤井 照景; 1548–1573) was a Japanese samurai of the Sengoku period. The onetime lord of Tatebayashi Castle in Kōzuke Province, he later became a retainer of the Utsunomiya clan.
