= Kakeda Toshimune =

Japanese samurai

Kakeda Toshimune (died 1553) was a Japanese samurai of the Sengoku period, who served the Date clan.
