= Kokusho Sōmokuroku =

Japanese historical reference book

The cover of the 1963 edition of the Kokusho Sōmokuroku.

The Kokusho Sōmokuroku (国書総目録, loosely "General Catalog of National Books") is a Japanese reference work that indexes books published in Japan or written by Japanese before 1867. First published by the Iwanami Shoten company in 1963, an expanded edition was released in 1989. In its current edition, the Kokusho Sōmokuroku consists of eight volumes, in addition to an author index and appendix. The catalog was put together by compiling over one million library catalog cards from over 600 libraries across Japan in an effort to catalog books published before the Meiji Restoration still in existence that were written in Japan or by Japanese nationals. The catalog does not contain Chinese classics, Buddhist scriptures, or books from non-Japanese sources.

== Organization ==
The catalog is organized by title which are listed in gojūon (Japanese syllabary) order (by line and initial sound) as opposed to Iroha order. The title is first listed in kanji, followed by reading in katakana. Each entry contains the name of the author or editor (when known), edition, date of publication (sometimes approximate), number of volumes, and genre. For each title, library and collection holdings are listed, with attention to the edition, including reprints, modern editions, wood-block prints, and so on. These listings contain many abbreviations, a list of which is given in the beginning of each volume.

The revised and expanded edition was released by Iwanami in 1989; however, the only major changes are symbols which cross-reference the main index with the appendixes and companion volumes. As of 2004, an online edition of the Kokusho Sōmokuroku is available at the website of the National Institute of Japanese Literature (NIJL). The database is searchable by title, author, genre and date, but is only accessible in Japanese and does not list textual variants or library holdings.

== Kotenseki Sōgō Mokuroku ==
The companion volume to the Kokusho Sōmokuroku is the Kotenseki Sōgō Mokuroku, published by Iwanami in 1990. It is a print version of the catalog of post-Meiji Japanese works listed by the NIJL, and contains a total of 91,000 entries, 43,000 of which do not appear in the original Kokusho Sōmokuroku. The organizational structure is the same as the original volume, with the exception that alternate titles are listed in a separate index opposed to cross-referenced in the main text. It consists of two volumes plus indexes.
