= Tsukushi Hirokado =

Tsukushi Hirokado (筑紫 広門, 1548 – May 22, 1615) was a military commander during the Sengoku period to the early Edo period in Japan. Based at Katsuo Castle in Hizen Province, he controlled an area extending to the southwestern part of Chikuzen Province. He was a son of Tsukushi Korekado.

In 1578, he rebelled against the Ōtomo clan and attacked Iwaya Castle in Chikuzen, but later switched sides after his daughter married Takahashi Tsunematsu, the son of Takahashi Shouun. In July of that year, he lost Katsuo Castle in an attack by the army of Shimazu Yoshihisa.

The following year, Hirokado joined Toyotomi Hideyoshi, who gave him Kamitsuma County in Chikugo Province. He accompanied Hideyoshi on two Korean campaigns.

During the Battle of Sekigahara, Hirokado served with the western forces of Ishida Mitsunari. Following defeat, he took refuge with Katō Kiyomasa of Higo.
