= Akizuki clan =

Japanese samurai clan

Akizuki clan 秋月
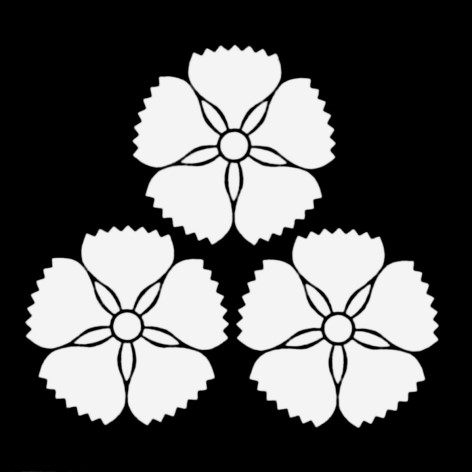
- Akizuki clan emblem
- Home province: Chikuzen
- Parent house: Ōkura clan
- Titles: Various
- Founder: Harada Tanekatsu (原田 種雄)
- Current head: Akizuki Tanetaka (秋月 種高)
- Founding year: 1202

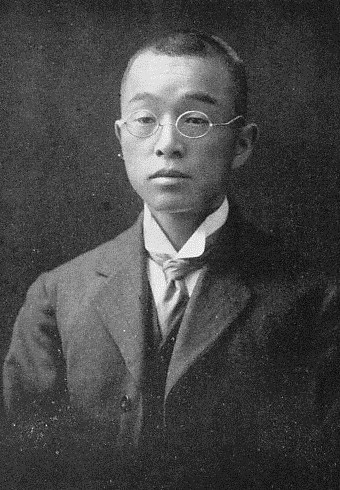
Akizuki Tanehide, 29th chieftain of the Akizuki clan, in 1913

The Akizuki clan (秋月氏, Akizuki-shi) was a Japanese samurai clan who ruled Takanabe Domain of what is now part of Miyazaki Prefecture in Kyushu Japan under the Edo period Tokugawa shogunate. In the Meiji period, the former daimyō became part of the kazoku peerage, with Tsugaru Tsuguakira receiving the title of shishaku (Viscount).

== Origins ==
The Akizuki clan is a cadet branch of the Ōkura clan, who claimed to be an immigrant (Toraijin) clan descending from Prince Kōki, son of Achi no Omi, founder of the Yamato no Aya clan of the Kofun period during the reign of Emperor Ōjin. During the Heian period, the Ōkura clan played an important role in the suppression of the Fujiwara no Sumitomo rebellion in Iyo Province and were given estates in Harada, Mikasa District, Chikuzen Province as a reward. The cadet branch of the clan who settled in Chikuzen adopted the surname "Harada". As with many minor clans in the late Heian period, the Harada found it politically expedient to identify themselves as members of the Heike clan, whom they supported in the Hōgen rebellion and Heiji rebellion. They also helped shelter the infant Emperor Antoku and other members of the Heike clan when they were driven from Kyoto by the forces of Kiso Yoshinaka. According to The Tale of the Heike, Harada Tanenao used his own residence as Emperor Antoku's temporary residence during this escape, this story is not confirmed due to various theories on fate of Emperor Antoku. However, after the defeat of the Heike at the Battle of Dannoura, Harada Tanenao was captured by the forces of Minamoto no Yoritomo and was sent to Kamakura as a prisoner of war. He was eventually pardoned in 1190 and allowed to return in 1202 as a retainer of the Kamakura shogunate to Chikuzen. During this situation, his son, Tanekatsu escaped from it and later he received the estate of "Akizuki", in what is now Asakura, Fukuoka. He changed his name to Akizuki Tanekatsu and is regarded as the founder of the clan.

== Muromachi and Sengoku period ==
During the start of the Nanboku-chō period wars, Ashikaga Takauji was defeated by the forces of Emperor Go-Daigo, and fled to Kyushu, where he attempted to raise a new army. He was attacked by Akizuki Tanemichi, who had remained loyal to the court; however, the Akizuki were defeated by Ashikaga forces at the Battle of Tatarahama. Later in the Nanboku-chō period, Akizuki clan was subordinate to the Ōuchi clan. After both Akizuki Fumitane and his son Harutane were killed in battle in 1557 against Ōtomo Sōrin, Akizuki Tanezane sought assistance from the Mōri clan. Following the defeat of the Mōri in northern Kyushu at the hands of the Ōtomo, the Akizuki turned to the Shimazu clan for assistance. Under Fumitane's second son, Akizuki Tanemi, the clan reached its peak, briefly controlling six districts in Chikuzen, four districts in Chikugo, and one district in Buzen, with an estimated kokudaka of 360,000 koku. However, this brief period of prominence came to an end with Toyotomi Hideyoshi's Kyūshū campaign of 1586–1587. Although the Akizuki surrendered without resistance to the Toyotomi's forces, due to their status as retainers of the Shimazu clan, the Akizuki territories were seized and the clan was relocated to a much smaller fief in Takanbe, Hyūga Province.

== Edo period ==
The Akizuki clan under Akizuki Tanenaga participated in Hideyoshi's invasion of Korea from 1592-1598 under the command of Kuroda Nagamasa. After Hideyoshi's death, he was assigned by Ishida Mitsunari to defend Ōgaki Castle in Mino Province against Tokugawa Ieyasu. However, on learning of the defeat of Ishida's Western Army at the 1600 Battle of Sekigahara, he immediately defected to the Eastern Army, killing all of the pro-Toyotomi commanders at the castle. Afterwards, with the assistance of Mizuno Katsushige, he was confirmed by the Tokugawa shogunate into his current territories at Takanabe, marking the start of the 30,000 koku Takanabe Domain.

The domain's early years were in turmoil over its tight finances, high debts, and the tyrannical policies of its karō; however, by the mid-Edo period the domain had settled into somnolence. The domain's income reduced to 27,000 koku in 1689, when the 4th generation daimyō, Akizuki Tanemasa, granted 3000 koku to his younger brother; Takanabe's income remained at 27,000 koku for the remainder of its history. The famed daimyō of Yonezawa Domain, Uesugi Yōzan (Harunori), was the 2nd son of the 6th daimyō of Takanabe, Akizuki Tanemitsu. Takanabe's domain school, Meirin-dō, was founded in 1778; it brought great acclaim to Takanabe as a center of education.

The location of the Takanabe Domain's main Edo residence is now occupied by Azabu High School in the Azabu district of Minato, Tokyo, Japan.

In the Bakumatsu period, Akizuki Tanetatsu the son of the final daimyō of Takanabe, was appointed as a wakadoshiyori by the shogunate in 1867. This was a highly usual promotion, due to his young age and status as heir to a tozama daimyō house, but Akizuki Tanetatsu was known for his education. However, by this time it was clear to him that the shogunate was doomed, and did not respond to orders or service, citing illness. In response, the shogunate even threatened to send a doctor, and with the assistance of Satsuma Domain, he escaped Edo on board a Satsuma ship. After the Meiji restoration he went to Kyoto and pledged fealty to the new Meiji government.

== Modern period ==
After the abolition of the han system on 1871, Akizuki Tanetatsu relocated to Tokyo. In 1872, he went abroad to study. He served as a member of the Genrōin from 1875 to 1880. When the Satsuma Rebellion began in 1877, he worked hard to prevent former Takanabe samurai from joining Saigō Takamori; however, his younger brother Akizuki Taneji joined the rebellion and was killed at the Battle of Shiroyama in Kagoshima. In 1884, Akizuki Tanetatsu was elevated to the kazoku peerage with the title of shishaku (viscount). In 1894, he became a member of the House of Peers in the Diet of Japan. His son, Akizuki Tanehide inherited the title of viscount, and served as a member of the House of Peers from 1914 to its abolition in 1947.

== Cultural references ==
The movie director Akira Kurosawa directed a movie about the Akizuki clan, called The Hidden Fortress (隠し砦の三悪人 Kakushi-toride-no-san-akunin), in 1958. In the film, the clan crest is depicted as a crescent. The Hidden Fortress was remade in 2008 by director Shinji Higuchi.

== See also ==
- Toraijin
- Achi no Omi
- Yamato no Aya clan
