= Myorin =

16th century Japanese samurai woman

Guardian of Tsurusaki Yoshioka Myorin-ni
- 吉岡妙林尼

Personal life
- Born: 16th-century
- Died: Unknown
- Spouse: Yoshioka Akioki
- Children: Yoshioka Munemasu
- Occupation: Bhikkhunī; Onna-musha; Military commander

Religious life
- Religion: Buddhism
- Dharma name: Myorin-ni
- Military career
- Allegiance: Ōtomo clan Toyotomi clan
- Unit: Yoshioka clan
- Conflicts: Kyūshū Campaign (1586)

Myōrin (妙林) or Yoshioka Myorin-ni (吉岡妙林尼) was a late-Sengoku period female warlord onna-musha. She was the wife of Yoshioka Akioki a samurai warlord, and served Otomo clan in Bungo. She was the heroic woman who defended the Otomo clan in the Kyūshū campaign against Shimazu's army. Her contributions to the Kyushu campaign were very significant and she was highly praised by Japan's most powerful man at the time, Toyotomi Hideyoshi. Later, she was named Guardian of Tsurusaki, an honorary title due to her heroic acts.

== Biography ==
Her real name, origin, year of death are unknown but her father was Kyosuke Hayashi. Myōrin-ni was just her Dharma name when she became a Bhikkhunī. She married Yoshioka Nagamasu's son, Yoshioka Akioki. In 1578 Akioki died in the Battle of Mimigawa against Shimazu army, thus his son Yoshioka Munemasu succeeded Yoshioka clan at the age of ten; because he was very young, Myorin took over the administration and acted as counselor for Munemasu. Luís Fróis describes that a woman ruled an area that is currently the Ōita city—that woman was probably Myorin. She in fact proved to be highly capable in the peacetime administration of the castle, but the course of her life had completely changed. Bolstered by their victory over Ryūzōji Takanobu at the Battle of Okitanawate in 1584, the Shimazu of Satsuma moved against the Ōtomo in 1586, concentrating their attacks upon the three fortresses of Funai, Tsurusaki and Usuki, a series of battles known as Kyushu campaign. The last pass to Satsuma conquer Kyūshū island.

== Kyushu campaign ==
In December 1585, Shimazu Iehisa the commander of Shimazu army, ordered his general to siege Tsurusaki castle with 3,000 soldiers. As Munemasu was at Usuki castle with Otomo Yoshihige, there remained quite limited soldiers in the castle. But Myōrin decided to resist against Shimazu, she strengthened small Tsurusaki castle digging the moats, placing the fences and boards as wall. Beside many pitfalls were made at the muddy ground around the castle, hidden by grasses. As the narrow path at the south of the castle is an expected approach route, a combination of wall and pits was added to stop the enemy. Ropes with bells were placed along the forest. Myōrin gathered local residents and armed, then waited for the arrival of Shimazu army.

=== Siege of Tsurusaki Castle ===
In 1586 Myorin led the defense of Tsurusaki Castle against an attack. The army of 3,000 men was led by the three Shimazu generals who expressed surprise on discovering that a woman was defending the castle. Myorin appeared on the walls dressed in full armour and carrying a naginata, she was accompanied by small number of soldiers, farmers and maids. Negotiations were set in motion and Myorin was offered substantial reward in gold and silver if she would surrender the castle, but she made it clear that she was prepared to defend it to the death.

The traps caused the Shimazu army to retreat several times, she commanded a Teppo (firearm) unit on the front line. The success of Myorin's strategies increased the morale of Yoshioka and Otomo's soldiers. Shimazu army once retreated and repeated their attack from different points, but Myorin rejected these attacks 16 times. The defense of Tsurusaki under her was kept up with vigor, the garrison losing only one man during the main assault and taking 63 heads of the Satsuma attackers. The heroic Myorin was clearly in the thick of the fighting because during one assault she received a deep arrow wound and was captured.

=== Under the control of Shimazu ===
Shimazu's army suffered a lot of damage and was left with few supplies. At that time the enemy commanders advised Myorin to make peace after she had been surrounded, so she agreed. Yoshioka's army left Tsurusaki, and entertained the commanders of Shimazu's army with a party. However, this was just Myorin's plan—she planned to gain the confidence of the enemy commanders, and even earned the respect of Nomura, a Shimazu general. She lived peacefully for months under Iehisa's rule, during which time she planned to rebel against them to gain control of Tsurusaki once again.

=== Battle of Terajihama ===
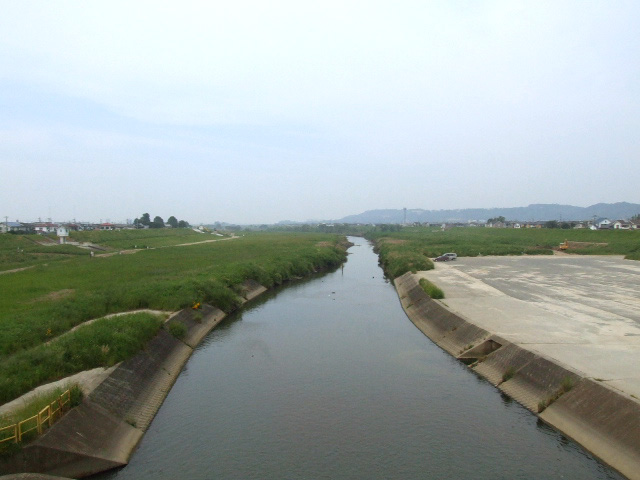
Otozu river

Three month after, facing the arrival of overwhelming army of central ruler Toyotomi Hideyoshi who led a large army of 200,000 and headed for the conquer of Kyushu, Shimazu army decided to retreat from Bungo province and protect their original territory. Myorin organized another party after learning of the invasion of Hideyoshi, she planned to lower the enemy's morale by handing out sake bottles, leaving the commanders and the troops drunk and unsettled. At this time, Myorin told the commanders of Shimazu that she was too involved with its clan and could not stay at this place. Therefore, she planned to accompany with them to Satuma. Commanders of Shimazu army trusted this and then left the castle in advance. Looking at this, Myorin advanced with her troops and attacked the dizzying army from backside. Shimazu army lost many soldiers and commanders, thus escaped from Tsurusaki area. Myorin launched another surprise attack around the Otozu River, defeating Shigemasa Shirahama and Hisabu, two high ranking generals. Nomura, a commander who befriended Myorin, was seriously injured with an arrow in the chest; He was the only commander who escaped alive, but he died days later.

In the next day after Myorin's victory at the Terajihama, she took over 60 heads of Shimazu's men forwarded to Otomo Sorin in Usuki castle, who was very encouraged thereby. Her wisdom and skill in martial arts that made her heroic were narrated by various locations and it is still possible to see the legacy of Myorin to this day.

After Hideyoshi heard about Myorin's heroic deeds, he was impressed and invited Myorin to join his service based on tales regarding her bravery, but she who accomplished revenge of her family declined this invitation and returned to quiet life.

== The Fall of Yoshioka's ==
Myorin's last lord was Ōtomo Yoshimune, eldest son of Otomo Sōrin and Lady Nata. Between 1592 and 1598, Hideyoshi invaded Korea. During the campaign, Ōtomo Yoshimune was a coward, which made Hideyoshi angry. Having failed as a military commander, Hideyoshi confiscated the lands of Yoshimune, ending the power of the Otomo family.

After Hideyoshi's death, In 1600, Ōtomo Yoshimune sided with Western Army led by Ishida Mitsunari in the Battle of Sekigahara (1600). When the Eastern army led by Tokugawa Ieyasu defeated Ishida allies, the Ōtomo clan lost its power even more, the family and retainers of Ōtomo was exiled. Yoshioka clan lost Tsurusaki area to Katō Kiyomasa, after this, the fate of Myōrin and her family is unknown.

== Popular culture ==
=== Book ===
- Yoshioka Myorinni is the protagonist of the historical novel book written by Akagami Ryo released in July 2019.

=== Games ===
- She makes an appearance in Samurai Warriors 4 Empires as a generic character.
- In Nobunaga's Ambition series of games she is an INT (Intelligent) type character.

== See also ==
- List of female castellans in Japan
- Shigashi
