= Otomo =

Otomo or Ōtomo is a Japanese surname.

People with the surname include:

- Ōtomo Chikaie (1561–1641), daimyō
- Ōtomo Chikasada (died 1570), samurai
- Ōtomo no Kuronushi (9th century), poet
- Ōtomo no Otomaro (731–809), samurai
- Ōtomo no Sakanoue no Iratsume (c. 700–750), poet
- Ōtomo Sōrin (1530–1587), daimyō who converted to Christianity
- Ōtomo no Tabito (662–731), poet
- Ōtomo no Yakamochi (718–785), waka poet
- Ai Ōtomo (born 1982), volleyball player
- Ayano Ōmoto (born 1988), singer, dancer and member of electropop girl group Perfume
- Katsuhiro Otomo (born 1954), manga artist and anime director, notable for Akira and other titles
- Prince Ōtomo (Ōtomo no ōji, 648–672), 39th Emperor
- Ryūtarō Ōtomo (1912–1985), actor
- Ryūzaburō Ōtomo (born 1952), voice actor
- Satoshi Ōtomo (born 1981), Filipino-Japanese footballer
- Shohei Otomo (born 1980), artist
- Tsutsumi Otomo (小友 坊; born 1975), Japanese ice hockey player
- Otomo Yoshihide (born 1959), experimental musician
