= Yoshihiro Kikuhime =

Wife of Otomo Yoshimune

Yoshihiro Kikuhime 吉弘菊姫
- Crest of the Ōtomo clan

Personal life
- Died: November 4, 1595; Zen'in Village, Chikugo Province
- Spouse: Ōtomo Yoshimune
- Children: Furuzenshio; Sabina; Maxima
- Parents: Yoshihiro Kanari (father); Ōtomo Yoshikane's daughter (mother)
- Other names: Ōtomo Justa; Yoshihiro Justa
- Posthumous name: Sonju-in (尊寿院)
- Occupation: Noblewoman
- Relatives: Takahashi Shigetane (brother); Yoshihiro Noriyuki (nephew); Tachibana Muneshige (nephew)

Religious life
- Religion: Christianity (converted in 1587)

Military service
- Unit: Ōtomo clan

Yoshihiro Kikuhime (吉弘菊姫, d. November 4, 1595) was a Japanese noble woman member of the Ōtomo clan from the late Sengoku period. She was the wife of Ōtomo Yoshimune, the lord of Otomo clan. She was also known as "Justa" or ''Giusta'' due to her baptismal name, with her posthumous Buddhist name "Sonju-in" (尊寿院) derived from it.

== Life ==
Kikuhime's father, Yoshihiro Kanari, was a notable retainer of the Ōtomo clan, while her mother was the daughter of Ōtomo Yoshikane, Yoshimune's grandfather, making her the sister of Takahashi Shigetane and the aunt of Yoshihiro Noriyuki and Tachibana Muneshige. She was also referred to as Ōtomo Justa or Yoshihiro Justa adopting the surname of her original family.

She had four children with Yoshimune, though she herself was initially frail. In 1587, she converted to Christianity under the influence of her father-in-law, Ōtomo Sōrin, and was baptized with the name "Justa." Her son was named "Furuzenshio," while her daughters were named "Sabina" and "Maxima."

During the Japanese Invasion of Korea in 1592, Kikuhime was sent to Osaka by the order of Toyotomi Hideyoshi and became a hostage at the Otomo residence in Osaka Castle. However, in 1593, following the disgrace of her husband, Yoshimune, who had faltered as a military commander during the Invasion of Korea, she was expelled from Osaka. Denied the opportunity to accompany her husband into exile, she faced a tragic destiny, wandering through Bungo Province with her three young children, lacking any form of support.

Kikuhime journeyed across the entire country with her three young children until they reached Bungo. She sought refuge with her nephew, Tachibana Muneshige, who was the lord of Yanagawa Castle, and was given a residence in Zen'in Village in Chikugo Province. Despite being taken in by her nephew, she died shortly thereafter due to the strain and fatigue that had exacerbated her already delicate health.

Despite the prohibition of Christianity at the time, she was buried according to Nichiren Buddhism customs, and her posthumous Buddhist name was "Sonjuin Den Nissho Daijo." Her grave is located at Sonjuin Temple in Miyama City, Fukuoka Prefecture. The temple was the first Hokke sect temple in the Yanagawa domain.

== Sources ==
- Kokusho Kankokai, ed. "National Diet Library Digital Collection, Genealogy Overview. Volume Two." Kokusho Kankokai, 1915.
