= Siege of Moji =

1561 Japanese battle

- Part of the Sengoku period and Japanese–Portuguese conflicts
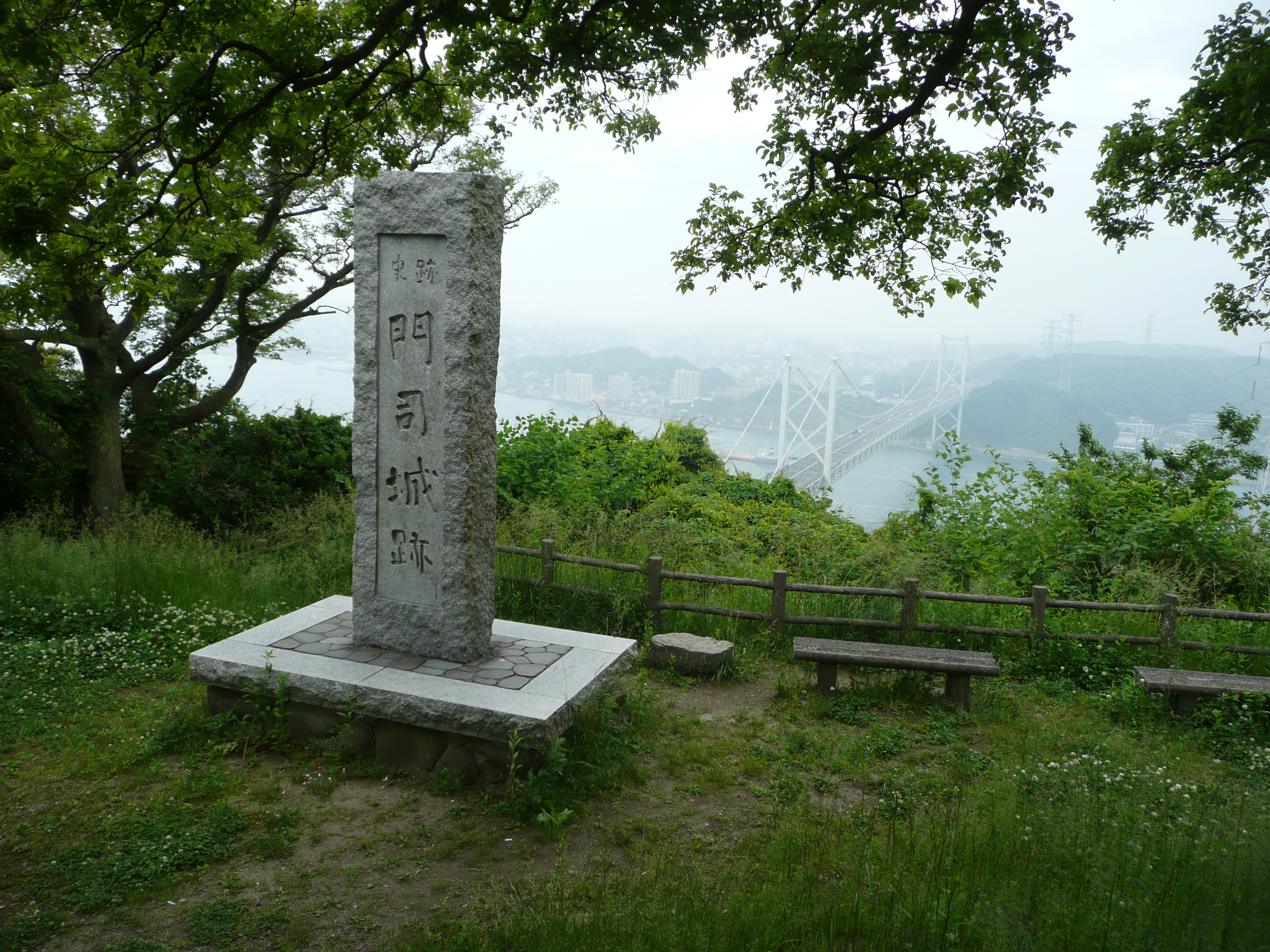
- The site of the ruined Moji castle
Date	1561
Location	Moji, Japan
Result	Mōri victory

Belligerents
Mōri clan	Ōtomo clan; Portuguese traders (brief)

Commanders and leaders
Mōri Takamoto; Kobayakawa Takakage; Murakami Takeyoshi; Nomi Munekatsu; Kodama Narikata; Horitate Iki-no-kami; Niho Takayasu	Ōtomo Sōrin; Ōtomo Chikasada; Tachibana Dōsetsu; Tawara Chikataka; Usuki Akihaya; Imi Danjo Saemon

Strength
	3 Portuguese ships 17 or 18 cannons

The siege of Moji (門司城の戦い, Moji-jō no tatakai) was a siege in 1561 of the castle of Moji in Japan. The castle belonged to the Mōri clan, whose capital was the city of Yamaguchi.

== Background ==
The original castle was built by Ōuchi Yoshinaga (Sorin's younger brother), who was forced to kill himself in 1557 with the advance of Mōri forces. Mōri Motonari captured the fort in 1558. Otomo Sorin recaptured the castle in September 1559, but later the Mōri, led by Kobayakawa Takakage and Ura Munekatsu, quickly recaptured the castle.

== Battle ==
In 1561, forces under Ōtomo Sōrin attacked the castle in alliance with the Portuguese, who provided three ships between 500 and 600 tons, each with a crew of about 300 and 17 or 18 cannons. This is thought to be the first bombardment by foreign ships on Japan.

The bombardment permitted the Ōtomo troops to establish themselves around Moji castle. After expending their ammunition, however, the Portuguese withdrew.

The castle's defenders nevertheless managed to break the siege lines and reinforce the castle. Ōtomo led an all-out assault on the castle on 10 October 1561, but the assault failed, and the castle finally remained in Mōri possession.

== See also ==
- Battle of Fukuda Bay
- Battle of Manila (1574)
- 1582 Cagayan battles
- Red Seal ship incident
- Nossa Senhora da Graça incident
