= Otomo (disambiguation) =

Otomo, or Ōtomo, is a Japanese surname. Otomo may also refer to:

- Otomo (automobile), automobile produced between 1924–1927
- Otomo (comics), character in the Marvel Comics universe
- Otomo (film), a 1999 German film
- Ōtomo clan, a samurai clan
- Otomo Station, train station in Iwate Prefecture, Japan
- 3911 Otomo, Main-belt asteroid
- Otomo, a fictional character in RoboCop 3
- Otomo, a song by Bonobo from the album Fragments
