= Lady Nata =

16th-century Japanese noblewoman

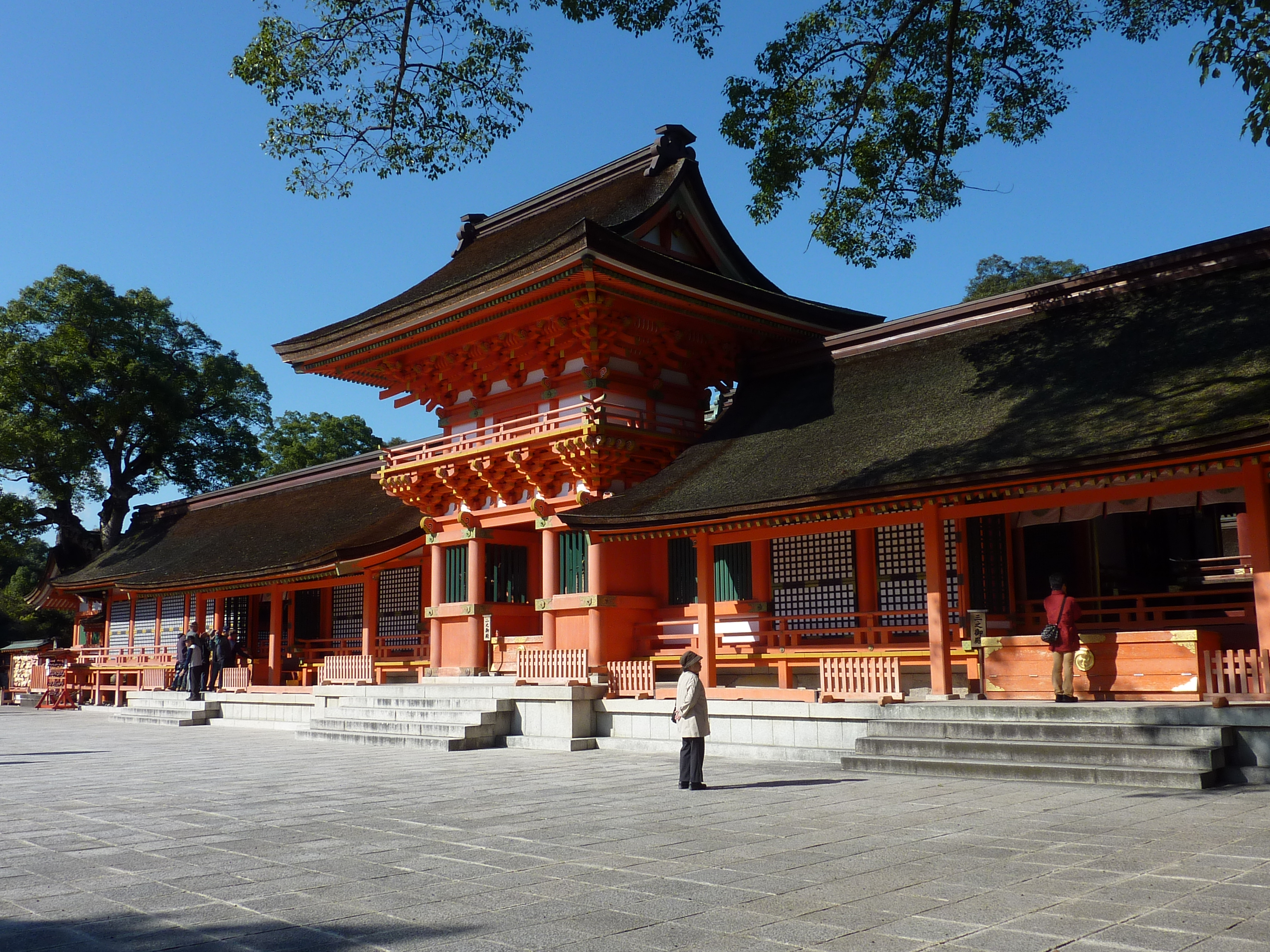
Usa Jingū Shrine

Lady Nata (奈多夫人, d. March 23, 1587), known in Christian scholarship as Ōtomo-Nata Jezebel, was a Japanese noblewoman from the Sengoku period. Daughter of Nata Akimoto, she was a high priestess of Usa Jingū. She was the first wife of Christian daimyo Ōtomo Sōrin. She actively resisted the Jesuit mission in Japan and the spread of Christianity in Kyushu.

Her religious and political influence was so great that she was the principal leader of the anti-Christian force in Bungo province during the rule of Ōtomo Sōrin.

== Life ==
Lady Nata married Ōtomo Sōrin around 1545, when he was around 15 years old. She was the mother of Ōtomo Yoshimune who succeeded Sōrin as head of the Ōtomo clan; their second son Ōtomo Chikaie, third son Ōtomo Chikamori the last two were adopted by Tawara Chikakata. She had a daughter who was engaged for a time to Chikakata's adopted son Tawara Chikatsura. Despite her husband's kind treatment of the Jesuits, she remained affiliated with her parents' Hachiman Shrine, and associated regularly with shrine maidens, Yamabushi and Bhikkhunī.

She has been described by resistant Buddhists as "the defender and martyr of the traditional religions that had given Bungo its coherence and peace until the Jesuits arrived."

=== Resistance against Christianity ===
Lady Nata was one of the main reasons for slow and difficult spread of Christianity in the Bungo province in 1570-1580. The Jesuits readily identified her as "a witch, pagan, idol-worshipping enemy of the church", and thus nicknamed her "Jezebel", the idol-worshipping queen of King Ahab from the Book of Kings — a figure associated with seduction, desire for usurpation of the office of the king, and protection of the prophets of Baal who fought against God's prophet Elijah.

Advised by Jesuits, Ōtomo Sōrin divorced Lady Nata in 1578, his clan retainers were completely opposed to the divorce. This event was the trigger for the Hachimangū's members to declare war on Christianity.

The Nata family controlled a large portion of the Kunisaki peninsula in northern Bungo, and Lady Nata held significant tracts of land herself. She gathered around herself numerous powerful supporters at court, who helped oppose Sōrin's destruction of Buddhist temples and Shinto shrines, abandonment of Shinto and Buddhism, and embrace of Christianity. She and her brothers, Tawara Chikakata and Nata Shizumoto, continued to resist the oppression of Christian daimyos and the massive presence of European Christian (specially Portugueses) in eastern Kyushu.

Sōrin turned against the Nata family and Usa Jingū shrine, attacking and burning the shrine repeatedly in the 1580s, and seizing its territories and armies to be placed under his direct supervision. After Lady Nata's death in 1587, the Nata family declined further; however, her religious influence is said to have lasted throughout the Edo period.
