= Gaspar Fernández (slave) =

Japanese-Mexican slave

- Gaspar Fernandes
- Born: c. 1577; Bungo Province, Japan
- Era: Age of Exploration
- Known for: The earliest recorded individual of Japanese descent to arrive in Mexico

Gaspar Fernández (Portuguese: Gaspar Fernandes) (born c. 1577 in Bungo, Japan), also known as Gaspar Japón, was a Portuguese slave of Japanese descent, once briefly in the service of the Portuguese merchant Rui Pérez. He was kidnapped by a fellow countryman in 1585 and sold to Pérez, whom he would come to accompany amid his time in the Philippines. Alongside his master, Fernández embarked upon a voyage to Mexico, where Pérez was to face trial due to suspicion of secretly practicing Judaism. Fernández would testify in his favor posthumously, and was ultimately able to gain his freedom by virtue of his identification with Native Americans, who were legally exempt from slavery.

== Biography ==
Born in Bungo (now Ōita Prefecture), a region of Southern Japan, he was abducted in 1585 at the age of eight, likely by his fellow countrymen; the fate of his parents is unknown. Shortly thereafter, he was sold to a Portuguese merchant in Nagasaki by the name of Rui Pérez, serving as his family's servant. He henceforth began learning Portuguese and Spanish, and accompanied his master to Manila, Philippines, over which the Spanish had dominion. Accused of being a Crypto-Jew in 1596, Pérez underwent persecution, ultimately being sent to Acapulco, Mexico, where he was to be subject to trial by the Inquisition. His family, along with Fernández, was among his company amid the voyage thereto; however, he died two days prior to their arrival in 1597. Nonetheless, Fernández was among those who testified on his behalf posthumously, serving as a witness for Pérez's religious beliefs. He also offered an explanation concerning his origins, a direct excerpt of which is preserved:

I am a free person, son of free father and mother, and not subject to enslavement, and my birth was in the city of Bungo in Japan, where they brought me kidnapped from to Nagasaki.

Believing he was never in the bondage of Pérez, he merely "petitioned for the embargo to be lifted so he could 'do whatever he wished with himself,'" which is said to indicate that he was not solely interested in his freedom, but also in receiving a portion of his late master's assets contained in the Inquisition treasury. However, he experienced little luck in that pursuit, although he was eventually legally emancipated in 1599—per the decision of the judge. Nonetheless, his liberty was not completely without scrutiny, as the prosecutor of the Inquisition alleged the presented witnesses were Jews, thereby discrediting their accounts. Fernández's lawyer countered the argument, reportedly stating that it was impossible for the Japanese to be enslaved, and thus Fernández would be unable to reassume such a status. Alongside another Japanese bondsman—Bentura—the two affiliated themselves with American Indians—who were barred from enslavement, by virtue of the New Laws of 1542—introducing themselves as a subset thereof: "yndios Japones." This notion with which the Inquisition was presented served as corroboration for the lawyer's reasoning, ultimately culminating in the conclusion of the case in 1604, affirming the conception that the Japanese were of the same race as the Indians, and hence were to be offered the same exemption.
