= Kaku Station =

Railway station in Ōita, Ōita Prefecture, Japan

Kaku Station 賀来駅
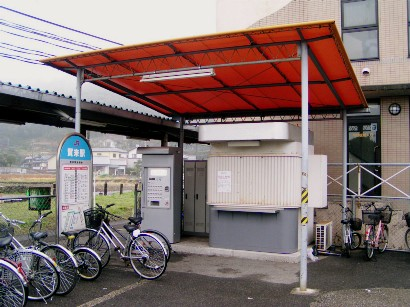
- Entrance of Kaku Station in 2005. The platform is to the left.

General information
- Location: 1-chōme-2 Kakunishi, Ōita-shi, Ōita-ken, 870-0850; Japan
- Coordinates: 33°12′47″N 131°33′45″E
- Operator: JR Kyushu
- Line: ■ Kyūdai Main Line
- Distance: 133.9 km from Kurume
- Platforms: 1 side platform
- Tracks: 1

Construction
- Structure type: At grade

Other information
- Status: Unstaffed
- Website: Official website

History
- Opened: 30 October 1915

Passengers
- FY2016: 565 daily
- Rank: 230th (among JR Kyushu stations)

Services
Preceding station	JR Kyushu	Following station
Bungo-Kokubu towards Kurume	Kyūdai Main Line	Minami-Ōita towards Ōita
Location
- Location within Oita Prefecture Location within Japan

Kaku Station (賀来駅, Kaku-eki) is a passenger railway station located in Ōita City, Ōita Prefecture, Japan. It is operated by JR Kyushu.

== Lines ==
The station is served by the Kyūdai Main Line and is located 133.9 km from the starting point of the line at Kurume.

== Layout ==
The station, which is unstaffed, consists of a side platform serving a single track. There is no station building, only a shelter on the platform for passengers. Another shelter at the station entrance houses an automatic ticket vending machine.

== History ==
The private Daito Railway (大湯鉄道) opened a track from Ōita to Onoya on 30 October 1915. Kaku was opened on the same day as one of several intermediate stations along the track. On 1 December 1922, the Daito Railway was nationalized and absorbed into Japanese Government Railways, (JGR) which designated the track which served the station as part of the Daito Line. On 15 November 1934, when the Daito Line had linked up with the Kyudai Main Line further west, JGR designated the station as part of the Kyudai Main Line. With the privatization of Japanese National Railways (JNR), the successor of JGR, on 1 April 1987, the station came under the control of JR Kyushu.

== Passenger statistics ==
In fiscal 2016, the station was used by an average of 565 passengers daily (boarding passengers only), and it ranked 230th among the busiest stations of JR Kyushu.

== Surrounding area ==
- Kaku Park
- Kaku Shrine

== See also ==
- List of railway stations in Japan
