= Bungo-Kokubu Station =

Railway station in Ōita, Ōita Prefecture, Japan

Bungo-Kokubu Station 豊後国分駅
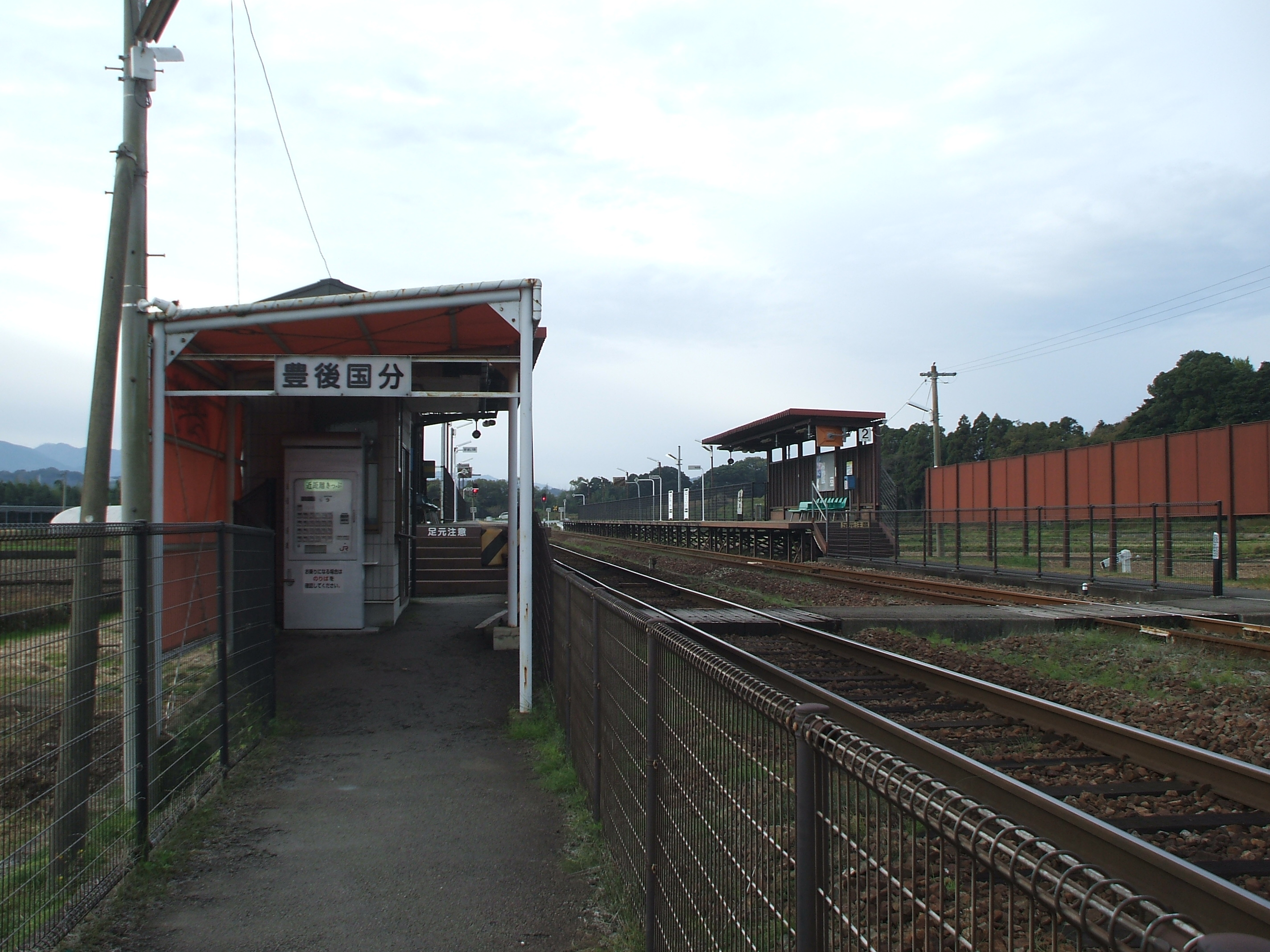
- Bungo-Kokubu Station in 2008

General information
- Location: Kokubu, Ōita-shi, Ōita-ken, 870-0864; Japan
- Coordinates: 33°11′43″N 131°33′05″E
- Operator: JR Kyushu
- Line: ■ Kyūdai Main Line
- Distance: 131.7 km from Kurume
- Platforms: 2 side platforms
- Tracks: 2 + 1 siding

Construction
- Structure type: At grade
- Cycle facilities: Designated parking area for bicycles
- Accessible: No - steps to platform

Other information
- Status: Unstaffed
- Website: Official website

History
- Opened: 11 March 1989

Passengers
- FY2016: 333 daily
- Rank: 295th (among JR Kyushu stations)

Services
Preceding station	JR Kyushu	Following station
Mukainoharu towards Kurume	Kyūdai Main Line	Kaku towards Ōita
Location
- Location within Oita Prefecture Location within Japan

Bungo-Kokubu Station (豊後国分駅, Bungo-Kokubu-eki) is a passenger railway station located in Ōita City, Ōita Prefecture, Japan. It is operated by JR Kyushu.

== Lines ==
The station is served by the Kyūdai Main Line and is located 131.7 km from the starting point of the line at Kurume.

== Layout ==
The station, which is unstaffed, consists of two side platforms serving two tracks with a siding. There is no station building but each platform has a shelter for passengers. One shelter also houses an automatic ticket vending machine. Access to the opposite side platform is by means of a level crossing.

=== Platforms ===
1	■ ■ Kyūdai Main Line	for Yufuin
2	■ ■ Kyūdai Main Line	for Ōita

== History ==
JR Kyushu opened the station on 11 March 1989 as an additional station on the existing track of the Kyudai Main Line.

== Passenger statistics ==
In fiscal 2016, the station was used by an average of 333 passengers daily (boarding passengers only), and it ranked 295th among the busiest stations of JR Kyushu.

== Surrounding area ==
- Oita City History Museum
- Bungo Kokubun-ji ruins

== See also ==
- List of railway stations in Japan
