= Minami-Ōita Station =

Railway station in Ōita, Ōita Prefecture, Japan

Minami-Ōita Station 南大分駅
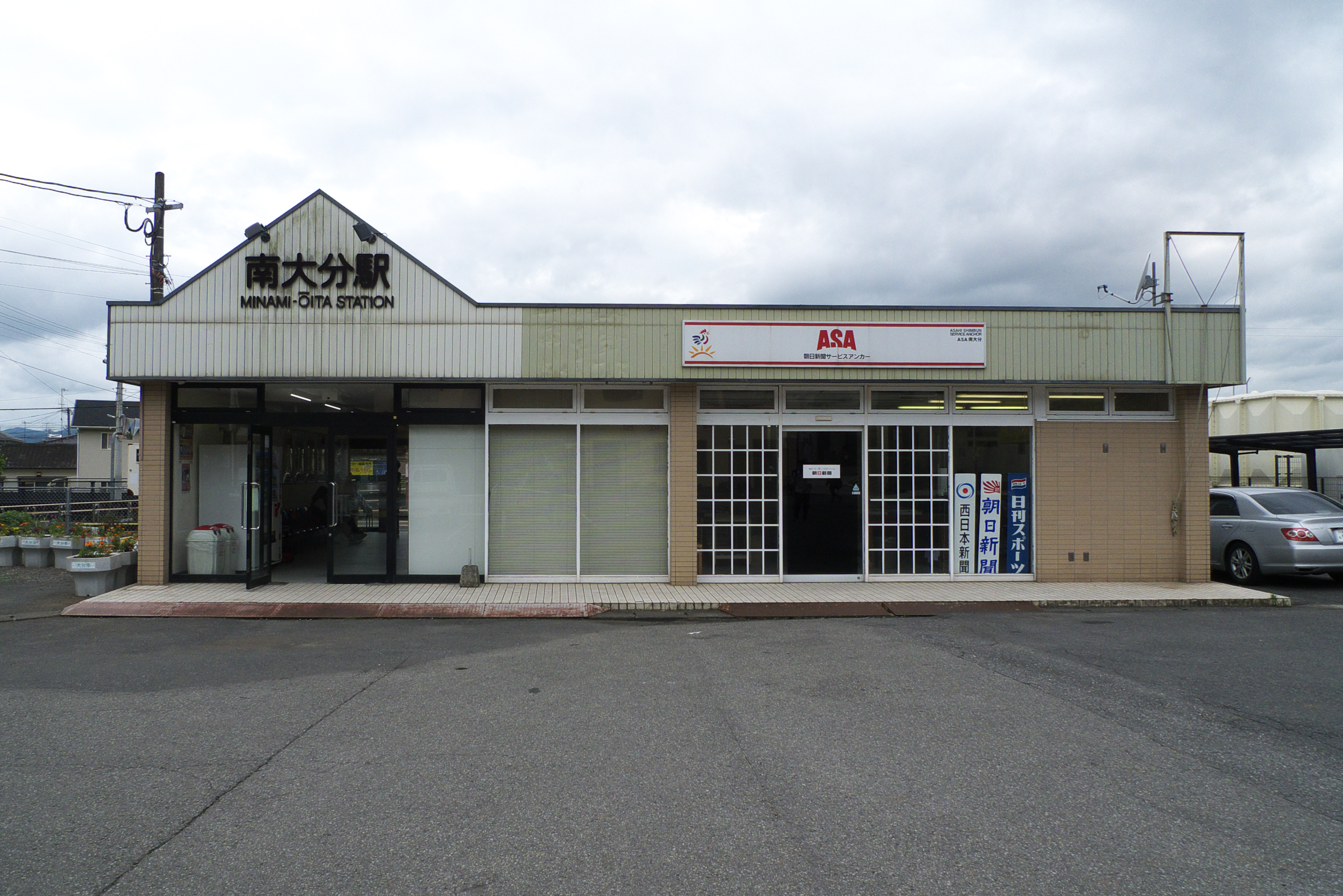
- Minami-Ōita Station in 2016

General information
- Location: 3-4-16 Ryōgo, Ōita-shi, Ōita-ken, 870-0889; Japan
- Coordinates: 33°12′51″N 131°35′09″E
- Operator: JR Kyushu
- Line: ■ Kyūdai Main Line
- Distance: 136.6 km from Kurume
- Platforms: 2 side platforms
- Tracks: 2

Construction
- Structure type: At grade

Other information
- Status: Staffed ticket window (outsourced)
- Website: Official website

History
- Opened: 30 October 1915
- Former names: Ryōgo (until 1 December 1925)

Passengers
- FY2016: 565 daily
- Rank: 231st (among JR Kyushu stations)

Services
Preceding station	JR Kyushu	Following station
Kaku towards Kurume	Kyūdai Main Line	Furugō towards Ōita
Location
- Location within Oita Prefecture Location within Japan

Minami-Ōita Station (南大分駅, Minami-Ōita-eki) is a passenger railway station located in Ōita City, Ōita Prefecture, Japan. It is operated by JR Kyushu.

== Lines ==
The station is served by the Kyūdai Main Line and is located 136.6 km from the starting point of the line at Kurume.

== Layout ==
The station consists of two side platforms serving two tracks. The station building is a modern steel structure and houses a waiting area and a staffed ticket window. Part of the building is occupied by a newsagent. Access to the opposite side platform is by means of a level crossing.

Management of the station has been outsourced to the JR Kyushu Tetsudou Eigyou Co., a wholly owned subsidiary of JR Kyushu specialising in station services. It staffs the ticket counter which is equipped with a POS machine but does not have a Midori no Madoguchi facility.

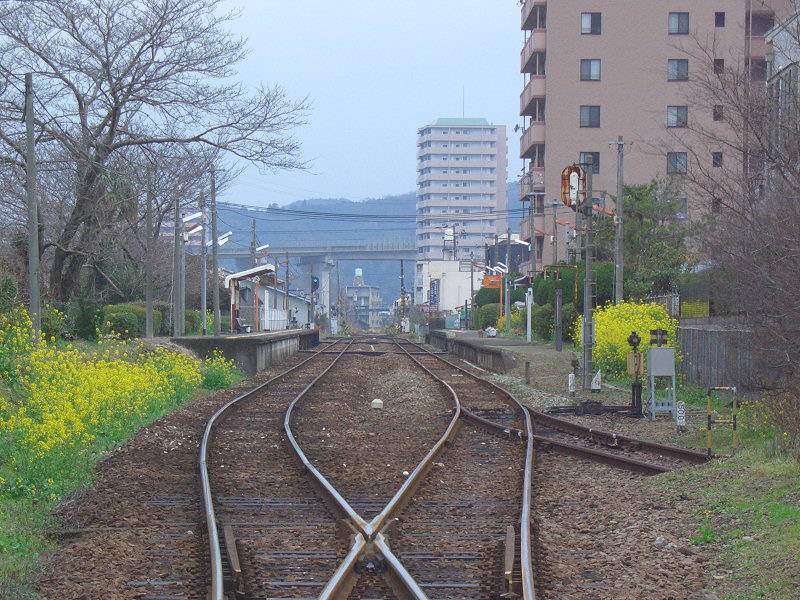
A view of the platforms and tracks.

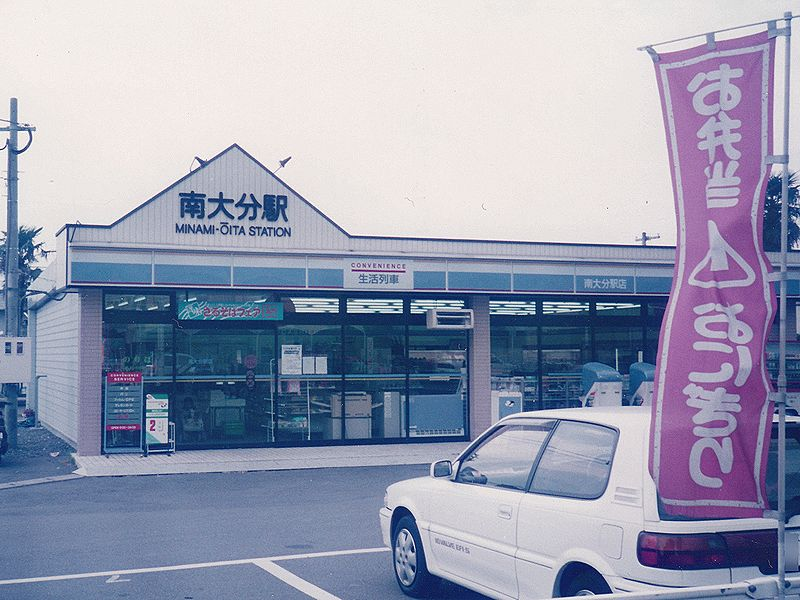
The station building in 1996. Note the entire frontage was occupied by a convenience store.

=== Platforms ===
1	■ ■ Kyūdai Main Line	for Ōita
2	■ ■ Kyūdai Main Line	for Yufuin

== History ==
The private Daito Railway (大湯鉄道) opened a track from Ōita to Onoya on 30 October 1915. This station was opened on the same day as one of several intermediate stations along the track as Ryōgo Station (永興駅). On 1 December 1922, the Daito Railway was nationalized and absorbed into Japanese Government Railways, (JGR) which designated the track which served the station as part of the Daito Line. On 1 December 1925, the station was remained Minami-Ōita. On 15 November 1934, when the Daito Line had linked up with the Kyudai Main Line further west, JGR designated the station as part of the Kyudai Main Line. With the privatization of Japanese National Railways (JNR), the successor of JGR, on 1 April 1987, the station came under the control of JR Kyushu.

== Passenger statistics ==
In fiscal 2016, the station was used by an average of 556 passengers daily (boarding passengers only), and it ranked 231st among the busiest stations of JR Kyushu.

== Surrounding area ==
- Oita City Minami-Oita Elementary School
- Oita City Minami-Oita Junior High School
- Japan National Route 442

== See also ==
- List of railway stations in Japan
