= Bungo Kokubun-ji =

Buddhist temple in Ōita, Japan

Bungo Kokubun-ji 豊後国分寺
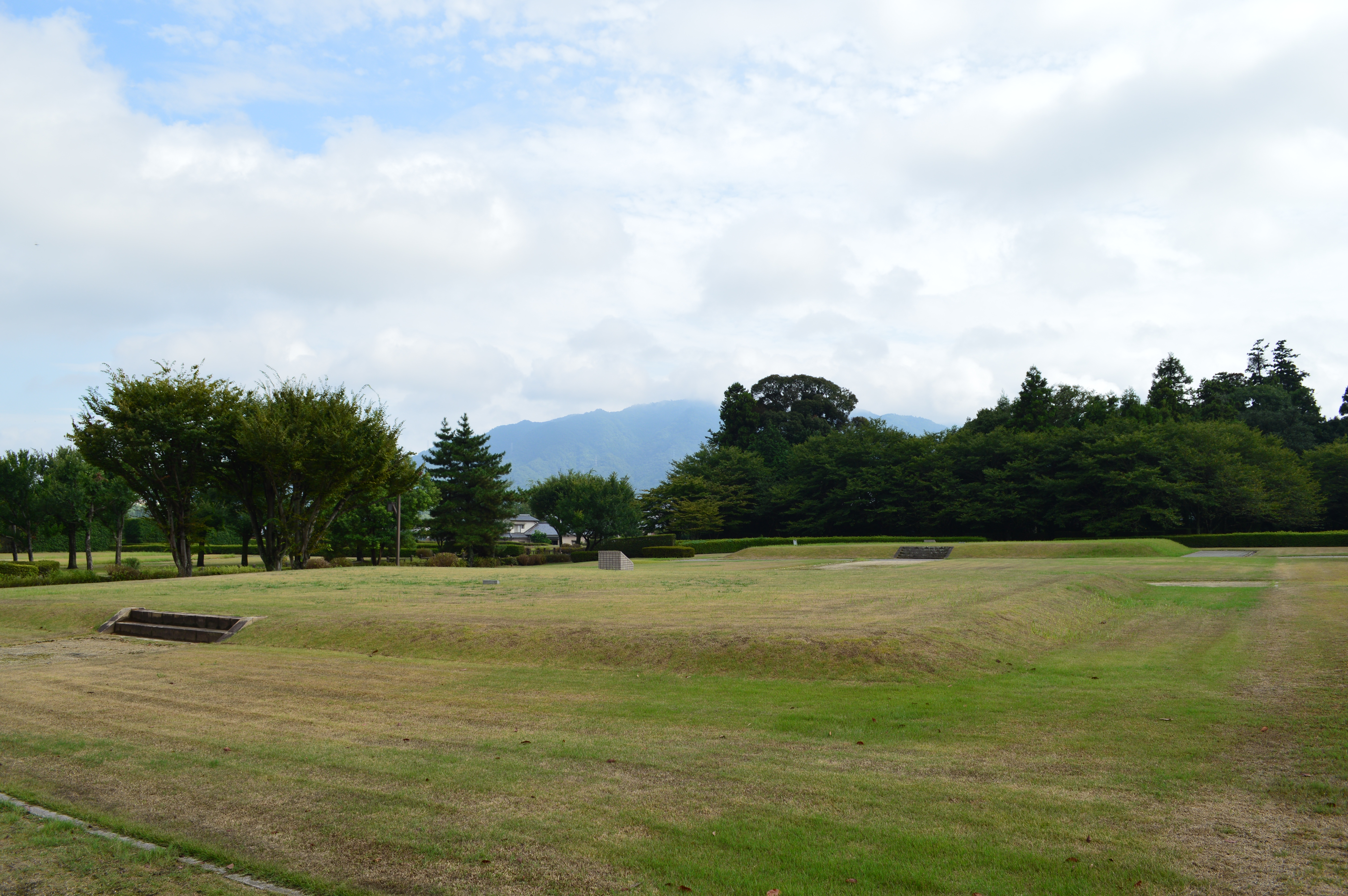
- Bungo Kokubun-ji

- Bungo Kokubun-ji Bungo Kokubun-ji (Japan)

Religion
- Affiliation: Buddhist
- Deity: Yakushi Nyōrai
- Rite: Tendai

Location
- Location: 972 Kokubu-chō, Ōita-shi, Ōita-ken
- Country: Japan
- Interactive map of Bungo Kokubun-ji 豊後国分寺
- Coordinates: 33°11′40.69″N 131°33′14.90″E

Architecture
- Founder: Emperor Shōmu
- Completed: c.741

Website
- Official website

Bungo Kokubun-ji (豊後国分寺) is a Buddhist temple in the Kokubu neighborhood of the city of Ōita, Ōita Prefecture Japan. It belongs to the Tendai sect, and its honzon is a statue of Yakushi Nyōrai. It claims to be the successor of the provincial temple established by Emperor Shōmu during the Nara period (710 – 794). Its honzon is a statue of Yakushi Nyōrai. The foundation stones and remaining traces of the Nara-period temple were designated as a National Historic Site in 1933.

== History ==
The Shoku Nihongi records that in 741, as the country recovered from a major smallpox epidemic, Emperor Shōmu ordered that a monastery and nunnery be established in every province, the kokubunji (国分寺). These temples were built to a semi-standardized template, and served both to spread Buddhist orthodoxy to the provinces, and to emphasize the power of the Nara period centralized government under the Ritsuryō system.

According to temple legend, in 741, a man named Ishikawa Minbu built both a temple and nunnery with the assistance of Fujiwara no Yoshifuchi, the governor of Bungo Province in accordance with Emperor Shōmu's edict. As this was the same year as Emperor Shōmu's edict, this account is somewhat problematic. However, in the Shoku Nihongi, official banners were sent in 756 to the kokubunji in 26 provinces, including Bungo, so the temple must have been competed by this time. This also corresponds to the dating of the earliest roof tiles excavated from the site. Per changes in the style of roof tiles, only 14 of the 64 kokubunji temples known retained much of their original structure to the end of the Kamakura period, and it appears that the Bungo Kokubun-ji was one of them. In 1240, the Ōtomo clan, who had been appointed shugo of the province by the Kamakura shogunate, brought in the famous monk Ninshō from Saidai-ji in Nara to revitalize the temple. From the Nanboku-chō period, the Bungo Kokubun-ji was regarded as a subsidiary of the Yusuhara Hachimangū shrine. Although many of the kokubunji had become bettō, or subsidiaries of Shinto shrines from the Heian period onwards, this is the only example of a kokubunji becoming subsidiary to an ichinomiya shrine. The Funai region was burned down by Shimazu Iehisa during his conquest of Bungo Province in 1568 and the Bungo Kokubun-ji was abandoned from this time. However, during excavations, no traces of burning were found in the ruins.

In 1675, the Tendai monk Enkai undertook a project to rebuild the temple, and a new Main Hall was completed in 1694. The current temple's main hall is styled a "Yakushi-dō " and is located on the foundations of the Nara-period Kondō, whereas a Kannon-dō chapel is located on the site of the original Pagoda. This chapel houses a Juichimen Kannon statue that is a designated Tangible Cultural Property of Oita City.

Revival began in the Edo period in 1675 by Enkai, a monk of the Tendai sect, and the main hall was completed in 1694.

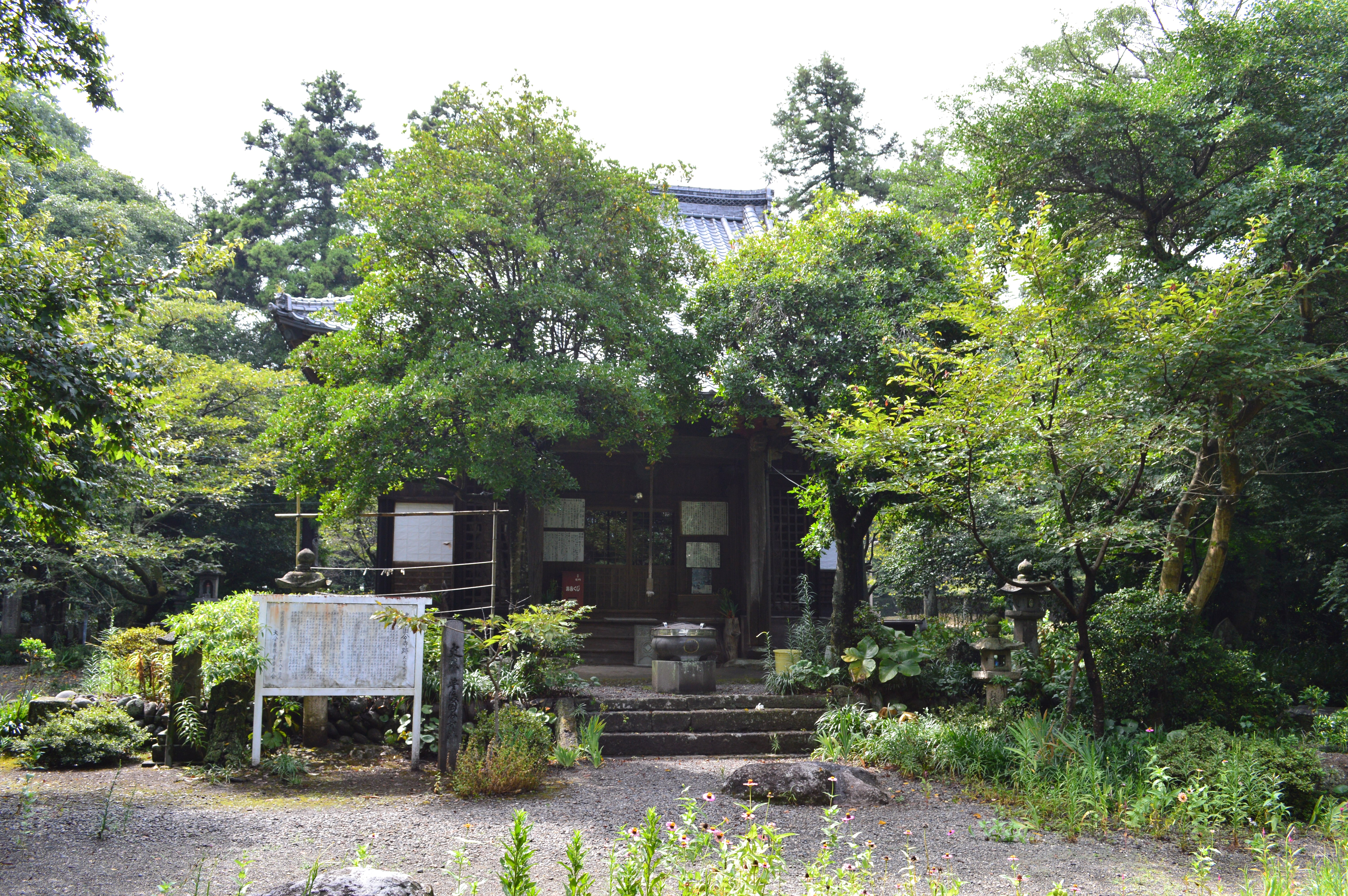
Yakushi-dō

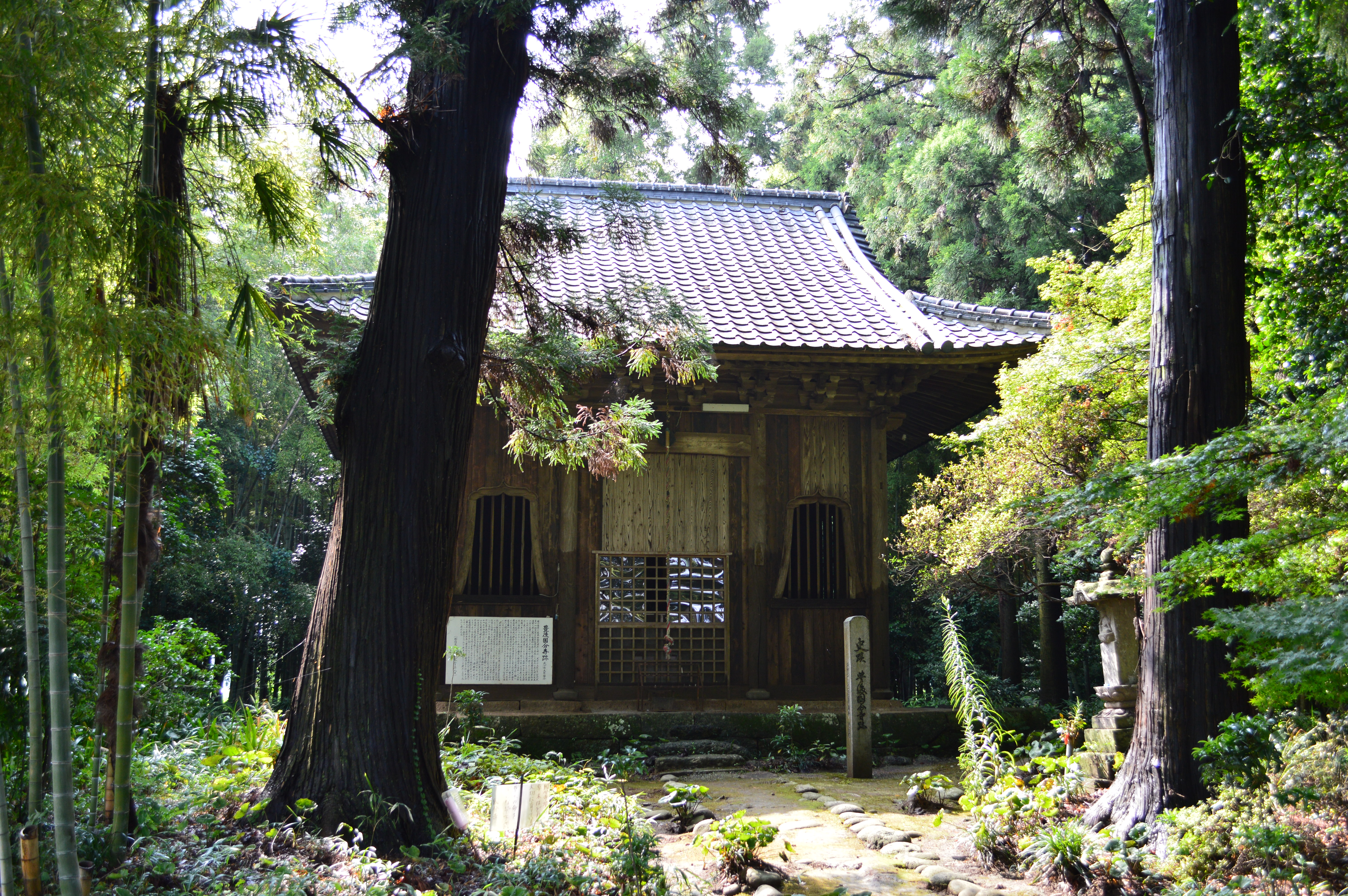
Kannon-dō

=== Bungo Kokubun-ji ruins ===
As a result of excavations, the original temple area has been determined to have been 183 meters east-to-west and 300 meters north-to-south. Inside this enclosure, the central gate, main hall, lecture hall, and dining hall were lined up from north-to-south, and a seven-storied pagoda was located to the southwest of the main hall, indicating that the layout of the temple of Daikandai-ji in Asuka was used as a template. The pagoda foundations were 18 meters on each side, indicating that the original structure had an estimated height of over 60 meters, making it one of the largest pagodas of any kokubunji. The cornerstones of the original Kondō were moved when the current Yakushi-dō was built, but it can be estimated that it was a seven by four bay structure.

Approximately 3.3 hectares of the site is now the Bungo Kokubunji Ruins Historic Site Park. Additionally, the Oita City Historical Museum has been constructed on adjacent land, displaying a restored model of Bungo Kokubunji's seven-storied pagoda and artifacts excavated. It is a two-minute walk from the JR Kyushu Kyūdai Main Line Bungo-Kokubu Station.

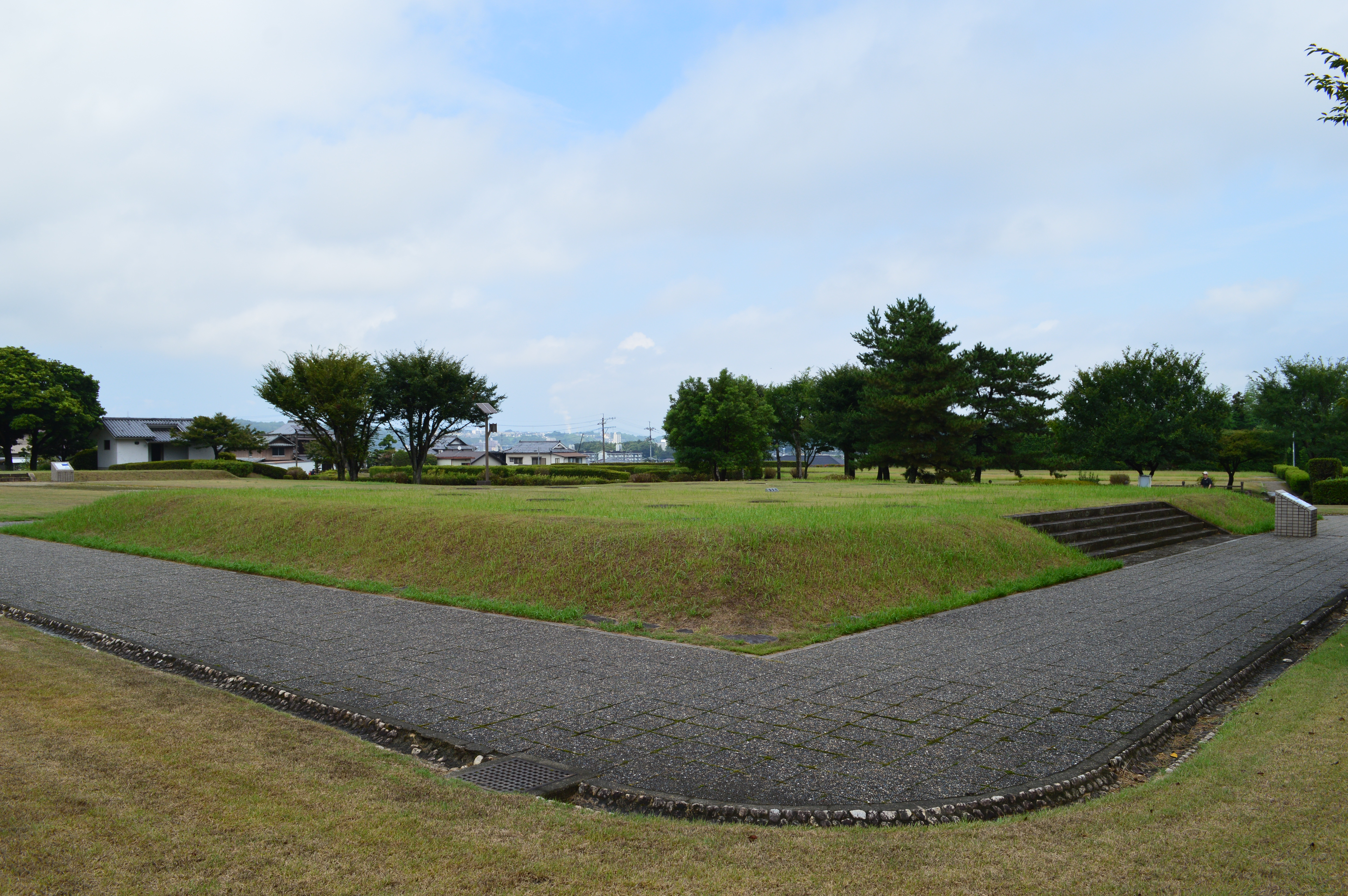
Site of Lecture Hall

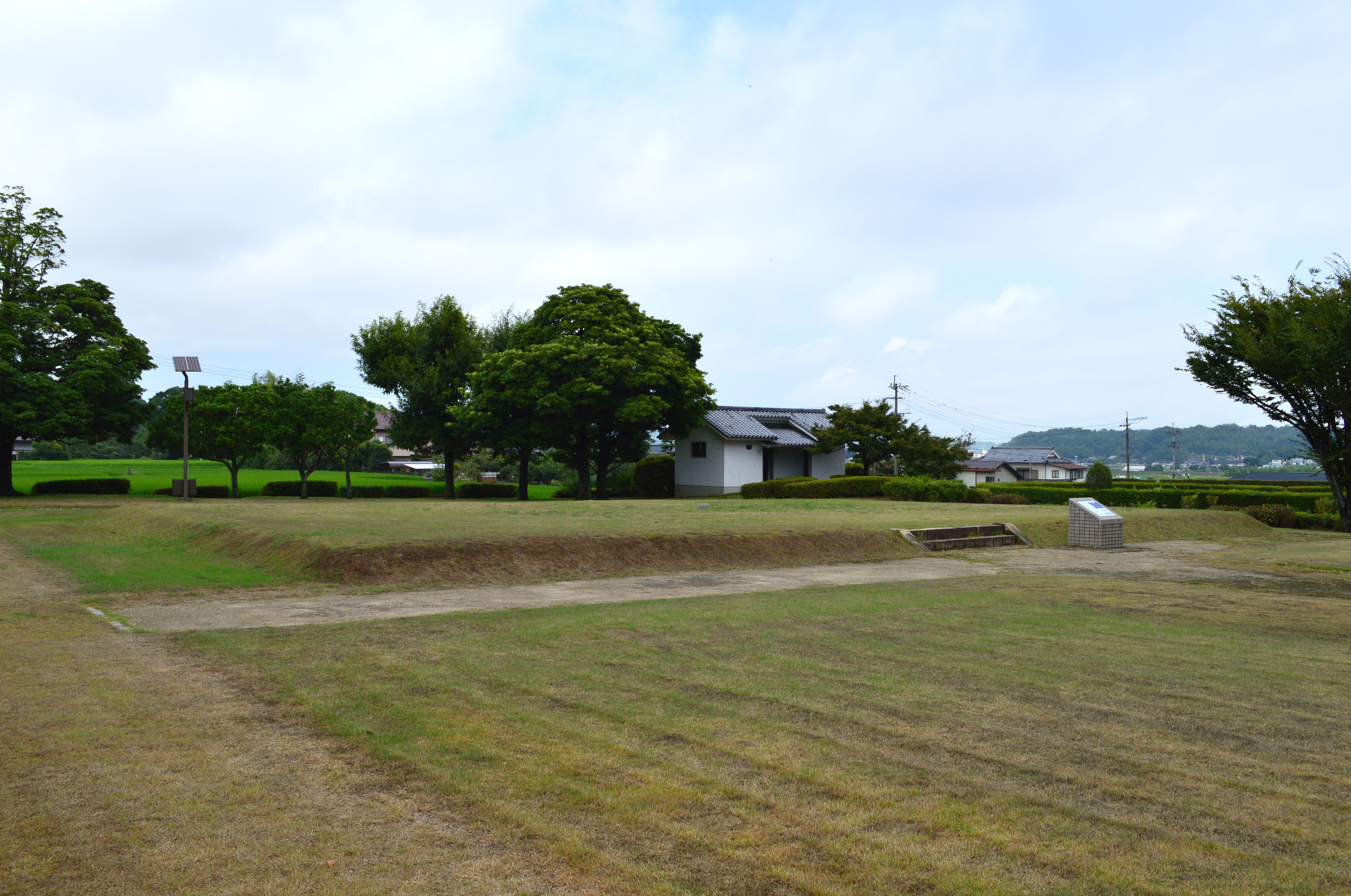
Site of Dining Hall

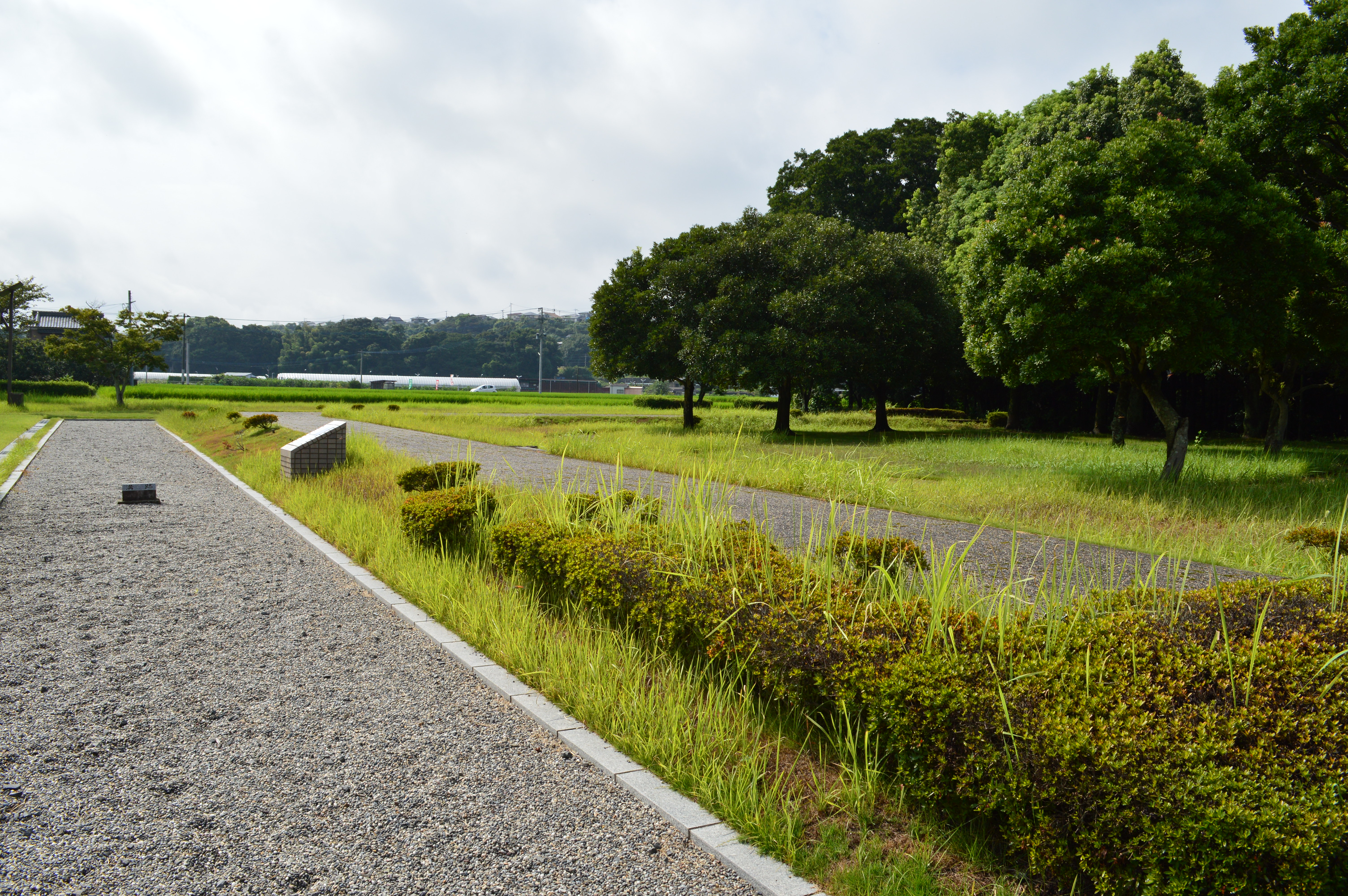
Site of Kairō (cloisters)

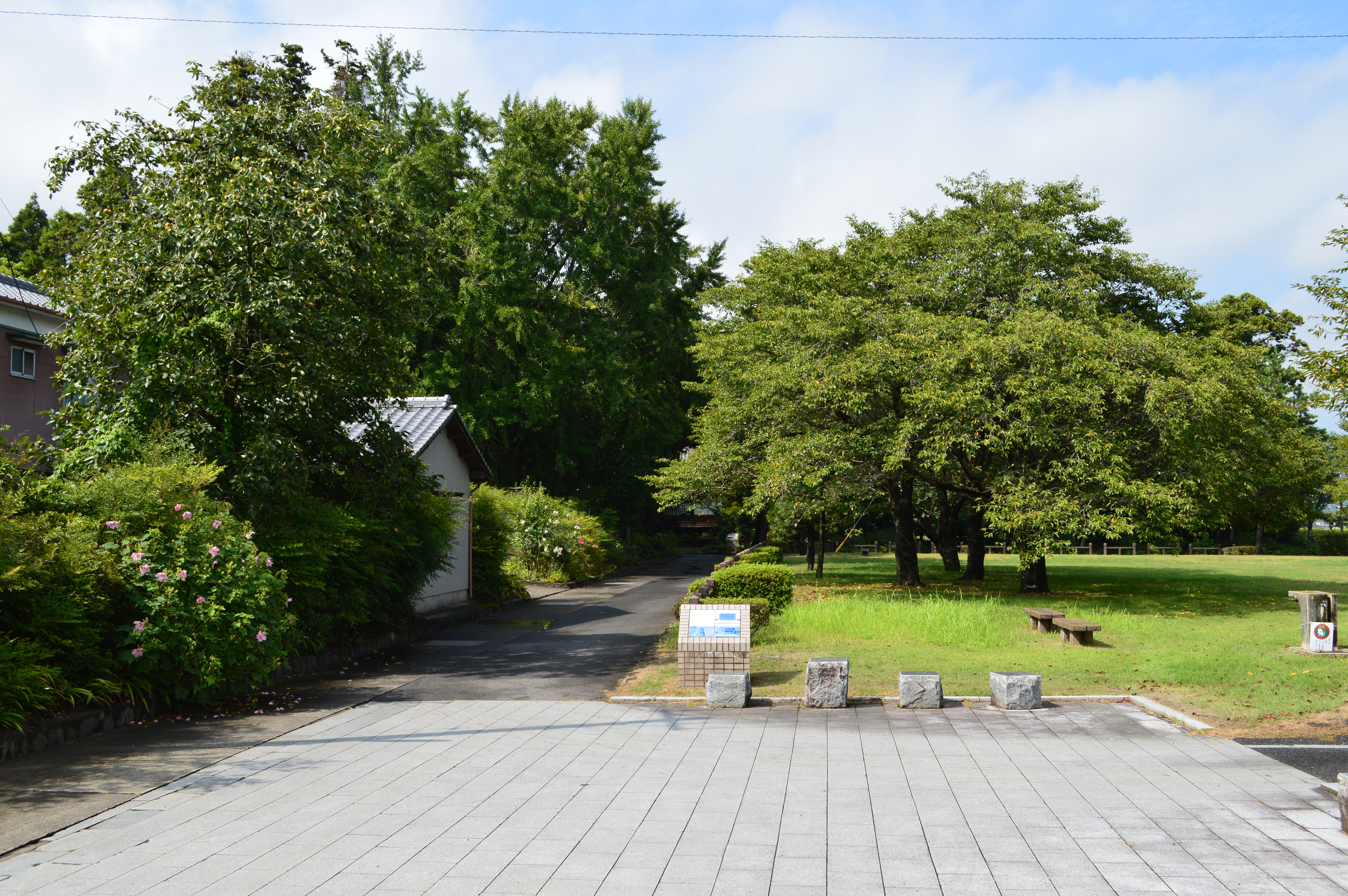
Site of Middle Gate

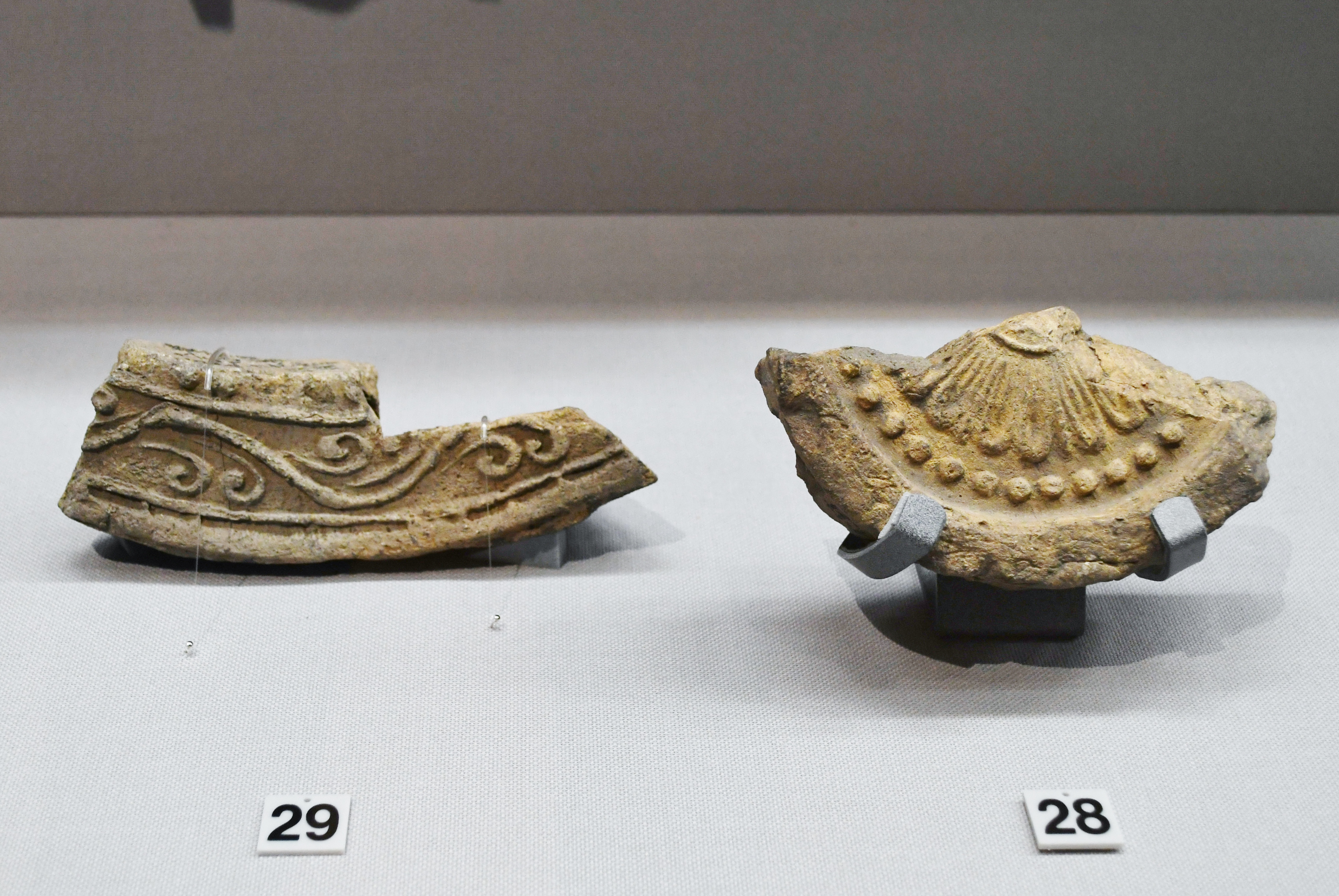
Roof tiles

== Bungo Kokubun-niji ==
The location of the nunnery associated with the Bongo Kokubun-ji is unclear. Outside the Bungo Kokubun-ji grounds, in the northwestern area, there are remains of four post-hole buildings, where pottery with the inscription " Ama-dera Tencho-9" was excavated. Although this remains are not the Kokubun-nunnery itself, they are evidence of the existence of a nunnery in Tenchō 9 (832), and the pottery shards have been designated a Tangible Cultural Property of Oita City.

== See also ==
- List of Historic Sites of Japan (Ōita)
- provincial temple
