= Ōtomo Yoshimune =

Japanese Daimyo

Ōtomo Yoshimune 大友義統
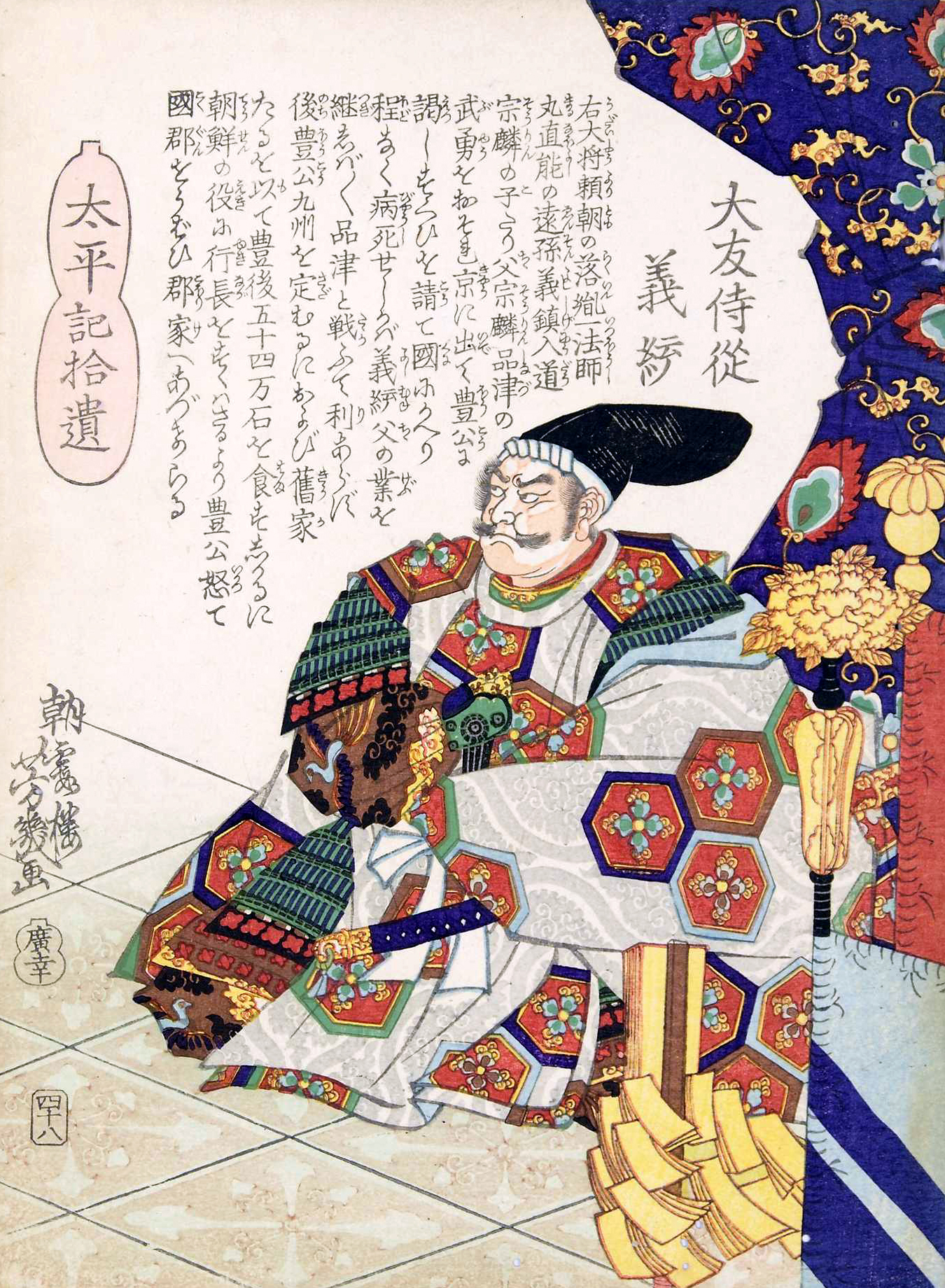

Head of Ōtomo clan
- In office 1587–1605
- Preceded by: Ōtomo Sōrin
- Succeeded by: Ōtomo Yoshinobu

Personal details
- Born: 1558 Bungo Province
- Died: 1605 (aged 46–47) Hitachi Province
- Parents: Ōtomo Sōrin (father); Lady Nata (mother)

Military service
- Allegiance: Ōtomo clan Toyotomi clan Western army
- Unit: Ōtomo clan
- Commands: Bungo province
- Battles/wars: Kyushu Campaign (1586-1587); Korean Campaign (1592-1593); Battle of Ishigakibara (1600)

Ōtomo Yoshimune (大友義統, 1558 – 1605) was a Japanese daimyō of the Sengoku period, heir of Otomo Sōrin at the head of the Ōtomo clan. He was the eldest son and successor of Otomo Sōrin as lord of the Bungo Province. His mother was an anti-Christian, known today only for the Jesuit epithet for her, Jezebel (Lady Nata). His wife was Yoshihiro Kikuhime.

== Biography ==
Yoshimune had been baptized in 1574 as Constantine, but was not in solidarity with missionaries such as Father Sōrin. Yoshimune officially succeeded his father Sōrin in 1576 and authorized the campaign to expel the Shimazu clan from Hyūga province. After the Ōtomo army was defeated in the Battle of Mimigawa (1578), Yoshimune was forced to maintain order within his clan due to the growing number of rebel vassals. Taking advantage of the death of Ryūzōji Takanobu at the hands of the Shimazu, Yoshimune sent an army to the territory of the Ryūzōji clan, although he did not get the hoped for success.

In 1586, when the Shimazu invaded the province of Bungo and Toyotomi Hideyoshi sent an expeditionary force to Funai (led by Chōsokabe Motochika and Sengoku Hidehisa), Yoshimune, against the advice of the Chōsokabe, insisted on taking the field to lay siege to Toshimitsu Castle. The result of this reckless siege was the Battle of Hetsugigawa, where Yoshimune and his allies were defeated. Yoshimune fled back to Funai, which soon had to abandon the Shimazu.

In 1587, after Toyotomi Hideyoshi's main forces invaded the island of Kyūshū and defeated the Shimazu, Yoshimune was confirmed as Bungo's daimyō.

In 1592, He led 6,000 men to Korea who were part of the army under the leadership of Kuroda Nagamasa, but showed cowardice in the fighting around Pyongyang: learning that a considerable Chinese force was moving in the area, Yoshimune ignored Konishi Yukinaga's request for help and he even withdrew from the countryside, an event that caused Wrath of Hideyoshi, who took the lands from the Ōtomo.

In 1600 Yoshimune sided with Ishida Mitsunari during the Sekigahara campaign, and clash against Kuroda Yoshitaka at the Battle of Ishigakibara; defeated and taken prisoner, Yoshimune was exiled to Hitachi province.

== Death ==
He died on September 2, 1610, as the last lord of the Ōtomo family. His son Yoshinobu (died 1639) served Tokugawa Ieyasu as a simple samurai and distinguished himself during the Siege of Osaka.
