= Ōtomo Chikaie =

Japanese daimyō

Ōtomo Chikaie (大友 親家; 1561 – 4 May 1641) was a Japanese general of the Azuchi–Momoyama period and the early Edo period. He was the second son of Ōtomo Sōrin.
