= Ōtomo Sōrin =

Japanese feudal lord

- 大友 宗麟
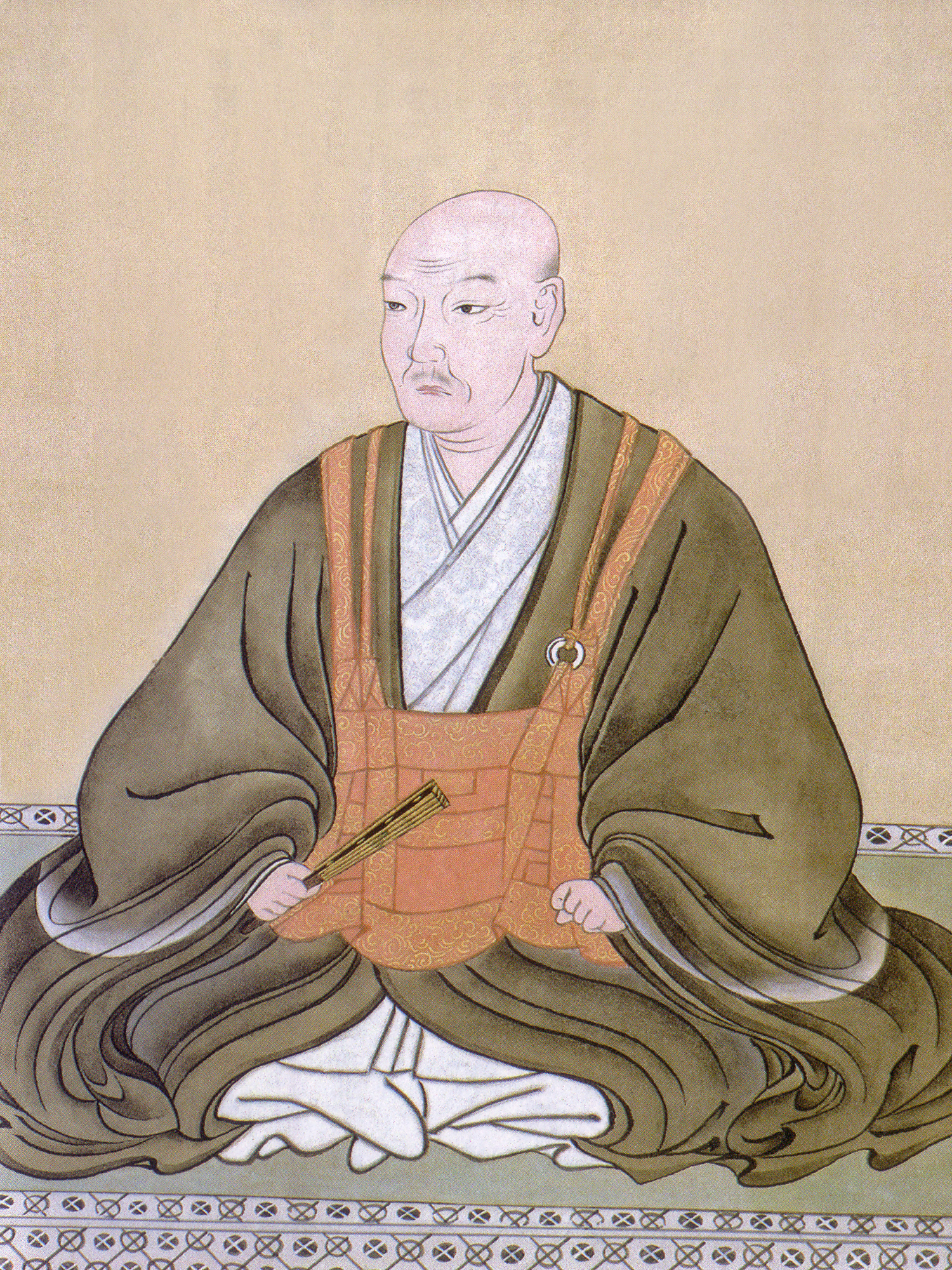

Head of Ōtomo clan
- In office 1550–1587
- Preceded by: Ōtomo Yoshiaki
- Succeeded by: Ōtomo Yoshimune

Personal details
- Born: January 31, 1530 Bungo Province
- Died: June 11, 1587 (aged 57) Tsukumi, Bungo Province
- Spouse: Ōtomo-Nata Jezebel
- Relations: Ōtomo Chikasada (brother); Ōuchi Yoshinaga (brother)
- Children: Ōtomo Yoshimune; Ōtomo Chikaie
- Parent: Ōtomo Yoshiaki (father)

Military service
- Allegiance: Ōtomo clan Toyotomi clan
- Unit: Ōtomo clan
- Commands: Usuki Castle
- Battles/wars: Chikuzen Campaign (1557); Siege of Moji castle (1561); Battle of Tatarahama (1569); Battle of Mimigawa (1578); Kyushu Campaign (1586-1587)

Ōtomo Sōrin (大友 宗麟; January 31, 1530 – June 11, 1587), also known as Fujiwara no Yoshishige (藤原 義鎮) or Ōtomo Yoshishige (大友 義鎮), was a Japanese feudal lord (daimyō) of the Ōtomo clan, one of the few to have converted to Catholicism. The eldest son of Ōtomo Yoshiaki, he inherited the Funai Domain, on Kyūshū, Japan's southernmost main island, from his father. He is perhaps most known for having appealed to Toyotomi Hideyoshi to intervene in Kyūshū against the Shimazu clan, thus spurring Hideyoshi's Kyūshū Campaign of 1587.

== Early life ==
In 1545, Sōrin married Lady Nata (Jezebel) who became one of the leading personalities against the spread of Christianity in western Japan. She was the daughter of Nata Akimoto, the head priest of the Nata Hachiman Shrine. Sōrin's domain included the port of Funai, which was frequented by Jesuit priests, bandits, Chinese merchants, and Japanese sea lords. In addition to unifying much of Kyūshū under his control, therefore securing a significant gain in his clan's power and prestige, Sōrin is also quite significant as one of the daimyōs to meet personally with the Jesuit missionary Francis Xavier in 1551, one of the first Europeans in Japan. Referred to as the "King of Bungo" in the Jesuit records, Sōrin sent political delegations to Goa in the 1550s, and the Tenshō embassy to Rome in 1582.

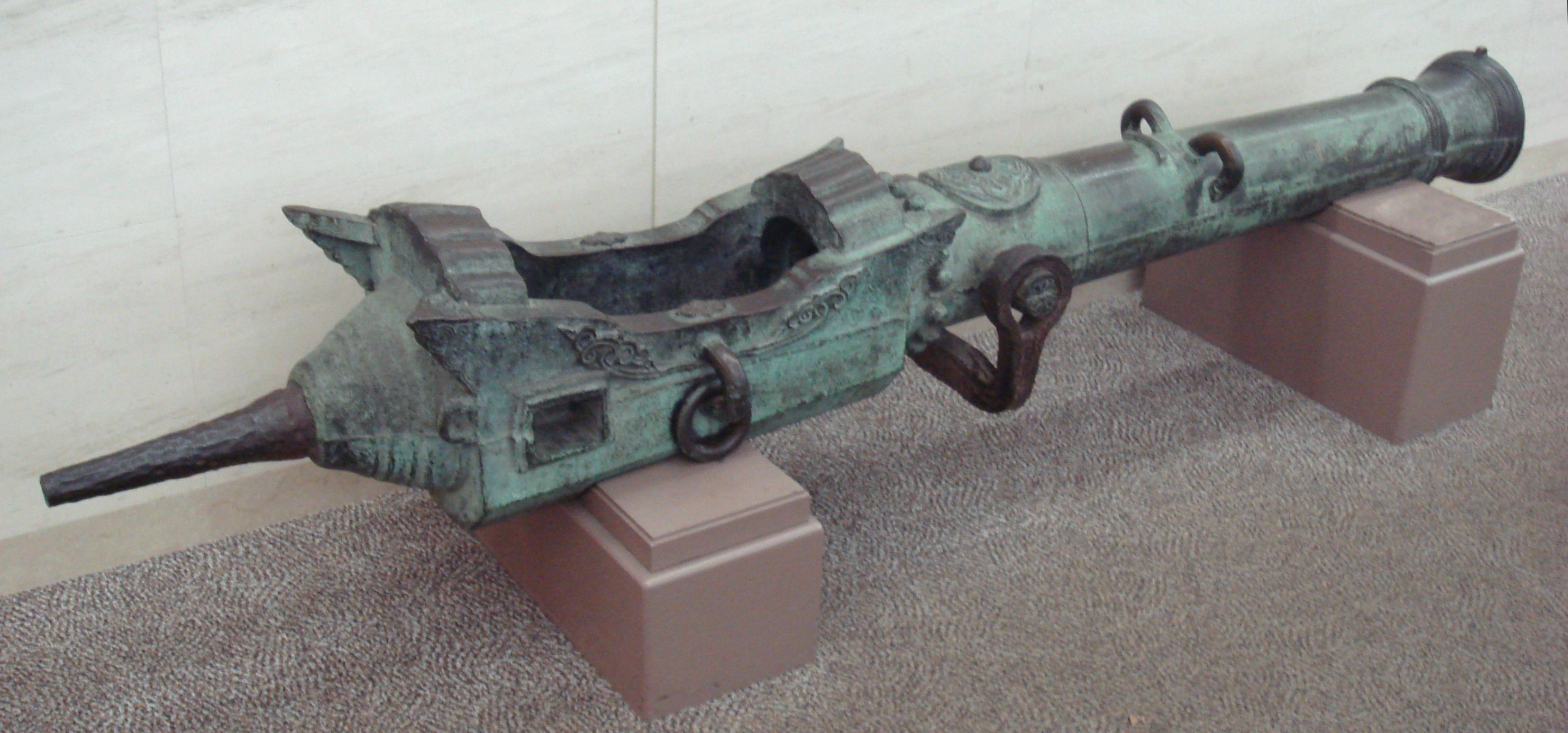
A Japanese breech-loading swivel gun of the 16th century, obtained by Ōtomo Sōrin, and nicknamed Kunikuzushi ("Destroyer of Provinces"). This gun is thought to have been founded in Portuguese Goa, India. Caliber: 95 mm, length: 2880 mm.

In addition to fostering relations with the Christians, Yoshishige fought a number of battles over the course of the 1550s, both gaining and consolidating territory. He defeated Kikuchi Yoshimune in 1551, and the warrior monks of Usa five years later; in 1557 he defeated Akizuki Kiyotane and seized Chikuzen Province.

In 1562, Yoshishige adopted the name "Sanbisai Sōrin" upon becoming a Buddhist monk, but remains best known as Ōtomo Sōrin, despite converting to Christianity under the baptismal name Francisco in 1578.

== Conflict with Mori ==
In 1557, Ōuchi Yoshinaga (Sōrin's younger brother) was forced to commit suicide by Mōri Motonari, and in 1558 Mōri captured Moji castle from the Ōuchi.

In September 1559, Ōtomo Sōrin then turned against the Mōri clan. He recaptured Moji castle. However, the Mōri forces led by Kobayakawa Takakage and Ura Munekatsu quickly took the castle again.

In 1561, Ōtomo Sōrin, in alliance with the Portuguese, laid siege to Moji. Ōtomo led an all-out assault on the castle but failed, and the castle finally remained in Mōri possession.

The head of the Mōri at that time, Mōri Takamoto, was assisted by the Shōgun Ashikaga Yoshiteru which led to a peace treaty between the clans. To secure peace, Sōrin proposed that his daughter marry Takamoto's son, Mōri Terumoto. It is not clear, however, if this offer was ever followed through.

In 1564, Sōrin was forced to quell a rebellion of the Akizuki clan of Chikuzen province, and then moved against the Ryūzōji clan of Hizen Province, which prompted the interference of the Mōri.

In 1569, Tachibana Dosetsu, a notable vassal of the Ōtomo, was attacked by the Mori. He was defeated and lost his castle. After Sōrin heard of this, he threatened the Mōri foothold in Buzen Province and attacked them at Tatarahama, forcing the Mōri to retreat and allowing him to retake Tachibana castle.

By this time, Sōrin controlled Bungo, most of Buzen, Chikuzen, and Chikugo, and had influence over Higo, Hizen and Iyo, soon became known as the "Seven-Province Host of the Ōtomo".

== Conversion to Christianity ==
Jesuit illustration of Ōtomo Sorin

In August 1578, Sōrin was baptized as Christian and given the name Francisco. Sōrin, with the urging of the Jesuits, ordered the destruction of Buddhist temples and Shinto shrines in his domain. He also ordered the forceful evictions of Buddhist monks and Shinto priests from their religious sites which were then reused as Christian structures. He forced his subjects to convert.

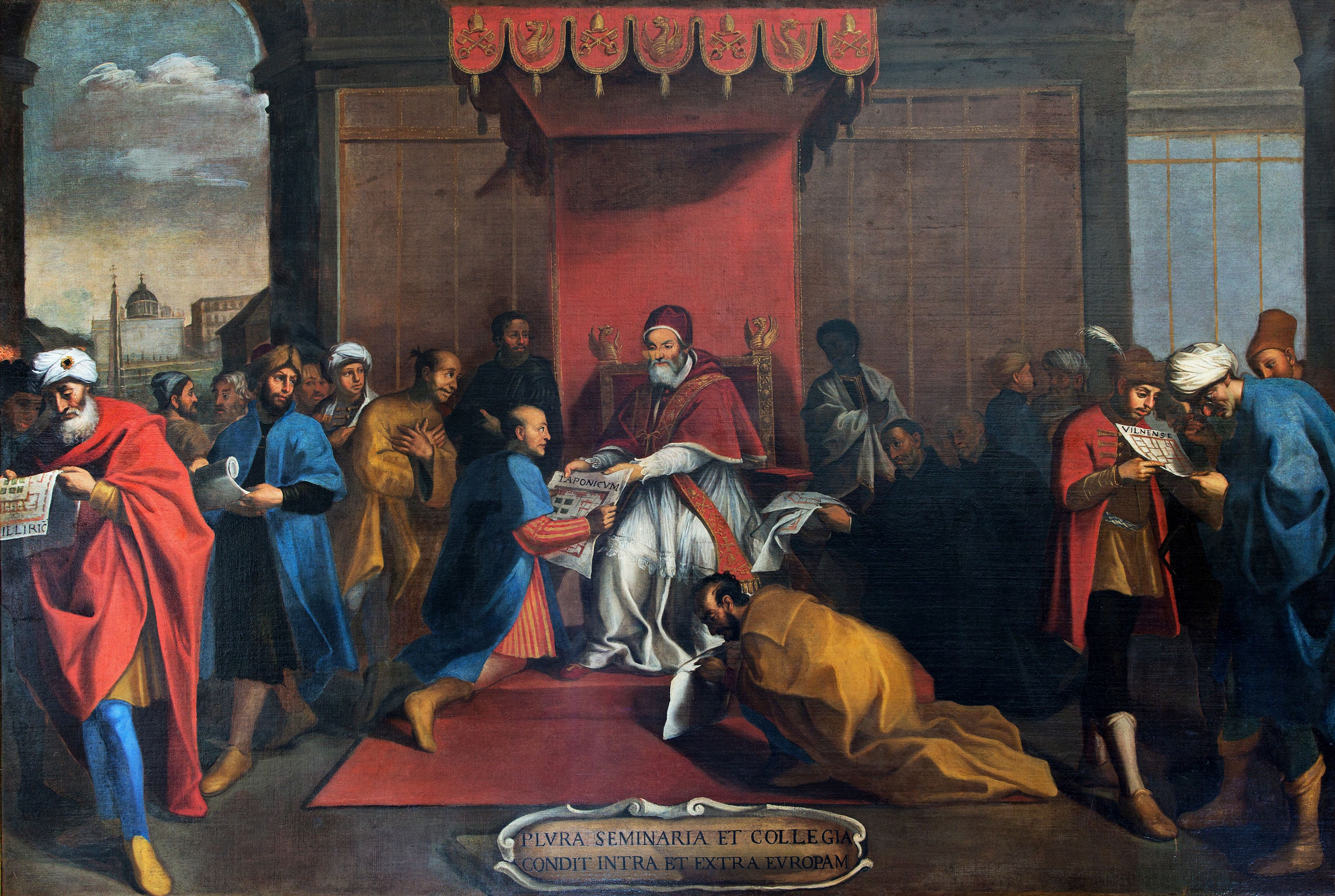
Ōtomo Sōrin sent the Tenshō embassy to Europe in 1582. Here, the Japanese embassy with Pope Gregory XIII on March 23, 1585.

Soon after his conversion, Sōrin and a force of samurais traveled to Tsuchimochi in Hyūga with the aim of establishing a new society based on European Christian principles. Sōrin then sent three captains into the area and ordered them to destroy important Shinto temples, which were then burned. After his conversion to near his death, he and his armies attacked multiple other shrines and temples. Although Sōrin attacked temples and shrines before his conversion to Christianity for political or economic factors, an additional factor, an iconoclastic Christian one, was then intertwined with the other motives for desecration.

== Conflict with Shimazu ==
In 1578, Sōrin came into conflict with the Shimazu family led by Shimazu Yoshihisa, the only major daimyō family remaining in control of significant portions of Kyūshū. Sōrin attacked Shimazu Takajo castle, but failed to capture the castle and lost at the Battle of Mimigawa.

In 1585, after Shimazu invasion of Chikuzen Province, Shimazu advanced and captured Iwaya Castle from Otomo's. Later, Sōrin along with the daimyō of the Ryūzōji clan, they appealed to Toyotomi Hideyoshi to aid in holding back the Shimazu, who were beginning to extend their influence over Ōtomo and Ryūzōji lands. Though at first unsuccessful in enlisting Hideyoshi's aid, eventually the Shimazu took up arms against the Ōtomo, Shimazu seize Toshimitsu Castle, Funai Castle and defeated Sōrin at Battle of Hetsugigawa in 1586.

In 1587, Hideyoshi began his Kyūshū Campaign, in which he overtook the entire island, with the help of the Ōtomo and other families which voluntarily entered his service.

== Death ==
In 1587, Hideyoshi left Kyūshū, restoring the Ōtomo to their domains, taken from them by the Shimazu, and arranging a peace, with all three families officially subject to Hideyoshi and holding the domains, now officially Toyotomi lands, in trust. In June 1587, Ōtomo Sōrin died before this campaign was complete, and so it was his son, Ōtomo Yoshimune, who held the ancestral lands upon the defeat of the Shimazu.

== Great Pillars of Ōtomo ==
- Kamachi Akimori (1520–1578), He was known as a skilled commander in the battle and serve in all Ōtomo Sorin major campaigns. He died in the Battle of Mimigawa.
- Takahashi Shigetane (1548–1586), He began his service beneath the Ōtomo of Bungo Province around this same initial time, with Ōtomo Sōrin as their leader and head. Eventually, Shigetane became the respective controller of the Takahashi clan.

== Notable retainers ==
- Tachibana Dōsetsu
- Ōtomo Chikasada
- Yoshioka Akioki
- Tawara Chikataka
- Yoshihiro Akimasa
- Usuki Akisumi
- Ichimata Akizane
- Shiga Chikamori

== See also ==
- Tachibana Ginchiyo
- Myorin
