= Ōtomo Chikasada =

Ōtomo Chikasada (大友 親貞; ? – 1570) a retainer of the Japanese clan of Ōtomo clan during the Sengoku period of the 16th century. Chikasada was the younger brother of the famous Ōtomo Sōrin. Throughout Chikasada's career, he led many an army throughout Sorin's campaigns in Chikugo, Buzen, and other provinces.

Following the year of 1570 Chikasada was assigned with over 60,000 troops to completely wipe out the Ryūzōji clan of Hizen Province. However, throughout this battle Chikasada failed in this attempt and died in the process. The rest of his army ended up being defeated at the Battle of Imayama in September of that same year.
