= Ōtomo clan =

Japanese samurai family

Ōtomo 大友
- Mon: Hana-gyōyō
- Home province: Bungo; Buzen
- Parent house: Fujiwara clan
- Titles: Shugo; Daimyō
- Founder: Ōtomo Yoshinao
- Final ruler: Ōtomo Yoshimune
- Founding year: 12th century
- Dissolution: 1593
- Ruled until: 1593
- Cadet branches: Tachibana clan; Honma clan; Hayashi clan

The Ōtomo clan (大友氏, Ōtomo-shi) was a Japanese samurai family whose power stretched from the Kamakura period through the Sengoku period, spanning over 400 years. The clan's hereditary lands lay in Kyūshū.

== Origins ==
The first family head, Ōtomo Yoshinao (1172–1223), took the name from the Ōtomo territory in Sagami Province. The clan claims descent from Emperor Seiwa (850-881) through the Seiwa Genji lineage of the Minamoto clan. Although the clan genealogy claims Yoshinao to be an illegitimate son of Minamoto no Yoritomo, it has been concluded that he was in fact a descendant of the Fujiwara clan.

== History ==
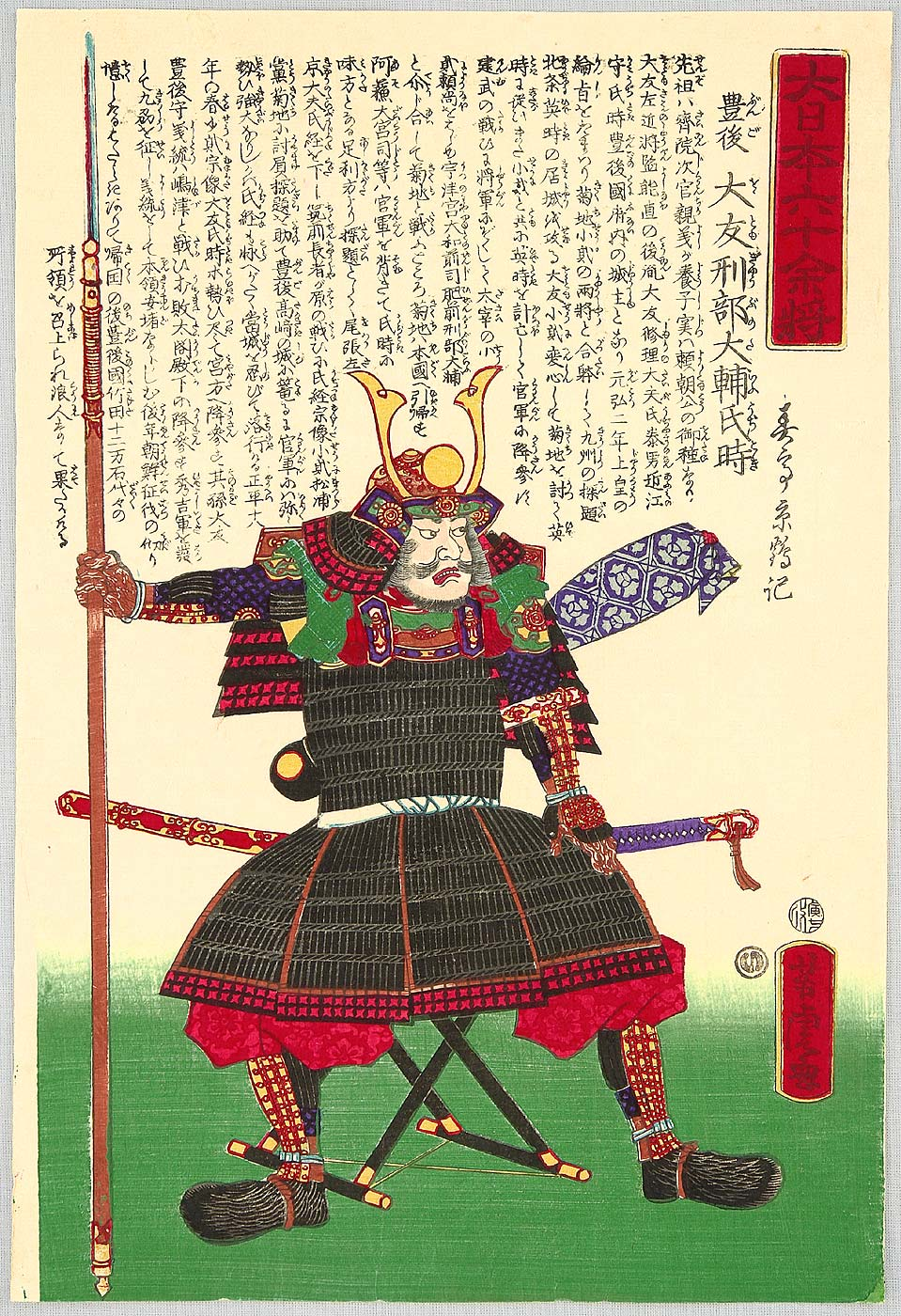
Ōtomo Ujitoki, 8th clan head

Following the establishment of the Kamakura shogunate in 1185, Yoshinao was granted the post of Governor (Shugo) of Bungo and Buzen Provinces in Kyūshū.

Ōtomo Yoshinao's descendants served as Governor of Buzen and Bungo Provinces for generations further establishing the power of Ōtomo clan in these two provinces. The clan would expand their power in Bungo Province along with the Shiga clan, founded by Yoshinao's eighth son Shiga Yoshisato, that had settled there earlier.

As the Ōtomo were one of the major clans of Kyūshū, along with the Shōni and the Shimazu, they had a central role in organizing efforts against the Mongol invasions of Japan in 1274 and 1281.

They also played an important role in the establishment of the Ashikaga shogunate, in the 1330s. Ōtomo warriors fought alongside those of Ashikaga Takauji and enabled him to win a number of key battles, including the battle of Sanoyama; this helped to ensure them powerful government positions in the new shogunate. Following the unrest of the Nanboku-chō period, the clan became an influential Shugo Daimyo family in Bungo, Buzen, and Chikugo Provinces during the Muromachi period.

Yoshinaga, 19th generation descendant of Yoshinao, along with his son Yoshiaki further became Sengoku period Daimyos. At the time of 21st generation Yoshishige, the Ōtomo clan reached its zenith by expanding its power to Hizen, Higo, and Chikuzen Provinces. At its zenith, the Ōtomo clan ruled six provinces (Buzen, Bungo, Hizen, Higo, Chikuzen and Chikugo) and two half-provinces (Hyūga and Iyo).

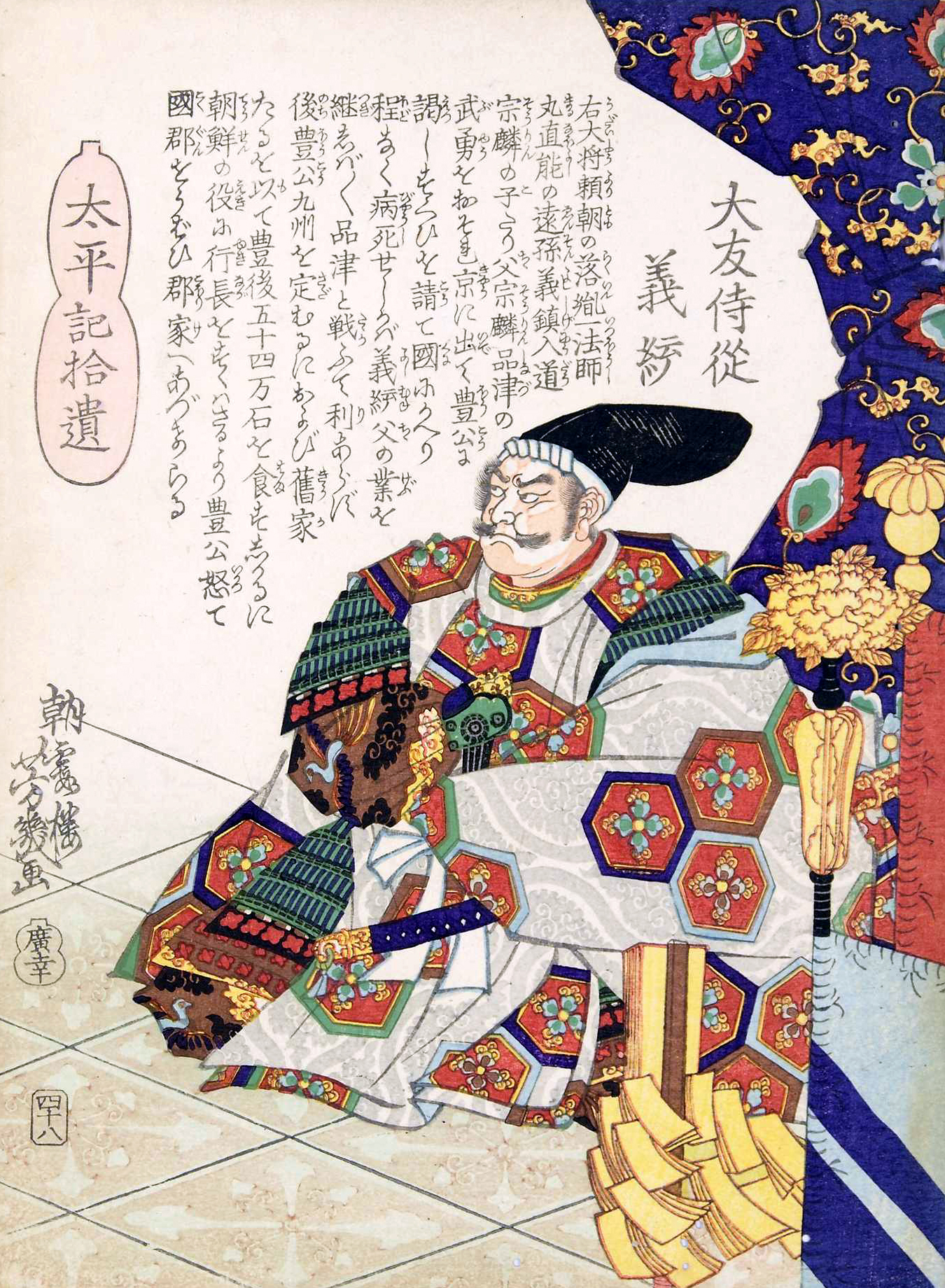
Ōtomo Yoshimune (1558–1610), 22nd clan head

Towards the end of the 16th century, the Ōtomo fought both the Shimazu and Mōri clans, the latter of whom were expert sailors. Though they did not play a major role in the campaigns of Tokugawa Ieyasu which ended the Sengoku period, they did retain their domains into the Edo period.

== European contact ==
A powerful clan throughout the Sengoku period (1467–1573), the Ōtomo are especially notable as one of the first clans to make contact with Europeans, and to establish a trade relationship with them. In or around 1542, three Portuguese ships were carried by a typhoon to the island of Tanegashima, just off the coast of Kyūshū. Within ten years, trade with the Portuguese was fairly regular and common in Kyūshū.

The Jesuit missionary Francis Xavier arrived in Japan in 1549, and soon afterwards met with Ōtomo Sōrin (Yoshishige), shugo of Bungo and Buzen Provinces, who would later be described by Xavier as a "king" and convert to Roman Catholicism in 1578. Ōtomo was eager to secure for his clan further trade and contact with the Portuguese, seeing the technological and, more importantly perhaps, economic benefits that could be derived.

In 1552, emissaries from the Ōtomo clan traveled to Goa with Xavier, to meet with the Portuguese Governor of India. Xavier and other Jesuit missionaries would return to Kyūshū, traveling and proselytizing; the Ōtomo were always well-disposed towards them, and they saw some success in Bungo as a result, converting many Japanese to Christianity.

== Clan Heads ==
1. Ōtomo Yoshinao (大友能直, 1172–1223)
2. Ōtomo Chikahide (大友親秀, 1195–1248)
3. Ōtomo Yoriyasu (大友頼泰, 1222–1300)
4. Ōtomo Chikatoki (大友親時, 1236–1295)
5. Ōtomo Sadachika (大友貞親, 1246–1311)
6. Ōtomo Sadamune (大友貞宗, ? –1334)
7. Ōtomo Ujiyasu (大友氏泰, 1321–1362)
8. Ōtomo Ujitoki (大友氏時, ? –1368)
9. Ōtomo Ujitsugu (大友氏継, ? –1401)
10. Ōtomo Chikayo (大友親世, ? –1418)
11. Ōtomo Chikaaki (大友親著, ? –1426), also called "Chikatsugu".
12. Ōtomo Mochinao (大友持直, ? –1445)
13. Ōtomo Chikatsuna (大友親綱, ? –1459)
14. Ōtomo Chikataka (大友親隆, ? –1470)
15. Ōtomo Chikashige (大友親繁, 1411–1493)
16. Ōtomo Masachika (大友政親, 1444–1496)
17. Ōtomo Yoshisuke (大友義右, 1459–1496)
18. Ōtomo Chikaharu (大友親治, 1461–1524)
19. Ōtomo Yoshinaga (大友義長, 1478–1518)
20. Ōtomo Yoshiaki (大友義鑑, 1502–1550)
21. Ōtomo Sōrin (大友宗麟, 1530–1587), originally Ōtomo Yoshishige (大友義鎮)
22. Ōtomo Yoshimune (大友義統, 1558–1610)
23. Ōtomo Yoshinori (大友義乗, 1577–1612)
24. Ōtomo Yoshichika (大友義親, 1597–1619)

== Notable members ==
- Ōtomo-Nata Jezebel (died 1587) – High priestess of Usa Jingū, wife of Ōtomo Sōrin and mother of Ōtomo Yoshimune
- Yoshihiro Kikuhime (d. November 4, 1595) wife of Ōtomo Yoshimune
- Ōtomo Sōrin (1530–1587), Constable of Bungo and Buzen Provinces
- Ōtomo Yoshimune (1558–1610), heir of Otomo Sorin.
- Ōuchi Yoshinaga (1532 – May 1, 1557), the younger brother of Ōtomo Yoshishige.
- Ōtomo Chikasada ( ? - 1570), the younger brother of the famous Ōtomo Sōrin

== Notable retainers ==
- Tachibana Dōsetsu
- Tachibana Muneshige
- Takahashi Shigetane
- Kamachi Akimori
- Tawara Chikataka
- Tsunokuma Sekiso
- Kutami Akiyasu
- Tagita Shigekane
- Saeki Karenori
- Yoshihiro Akimasa
- Usuki Akisumi
- Shiga Chikamori
- Yoshioka Akioki
- Myorin – Lady of Tsurusaki Castle

== Popular culture ==
Otomo is a playable nation in the grand strategy games Europa Universalis IV, Sengoku as well as in Total War: Shogun 2.

== See also ==
- Shimazu clan
- Shōni clan
- Tachibana clan
- Ruins of the Ōtomo clan
