= Bungo Province =

Former province of Japan

Map of Japanese provinces (1868) with Bungo Province highlighted

Bungo Province (豊後国, Bungo no Kuni; Japanese pronunciation: [bɯ̈́ŋ̀.ɡò̞ (nò̞ kɯ̈̀.ɲ̟ì), -ŋò̞ (nò̞ kɯ̈̀.ɲ̟ì)]) was a province of Japan in the area of eastern Kyūshū, corresponding to most of modern Ōita Prefecture, except what is now the cities of Nakatsu and Usa. Bungo bordered on Hyūga to the south, Higo and Chikugo to the west, and Chikuzen and Buzen to the north. Its abbreviated form was Hōshū (豊州), although it was also called Nihō (二豊). In terms of the Gokishichidō system, Bungo was one of the provinces of the Saikaidō circuit. Under the Engishiki classification system, Bungo was ranked as one of the "superior countries" (上国) in terms of importance, and one of the "far countries" (遠国) in terms of distance from the capital.

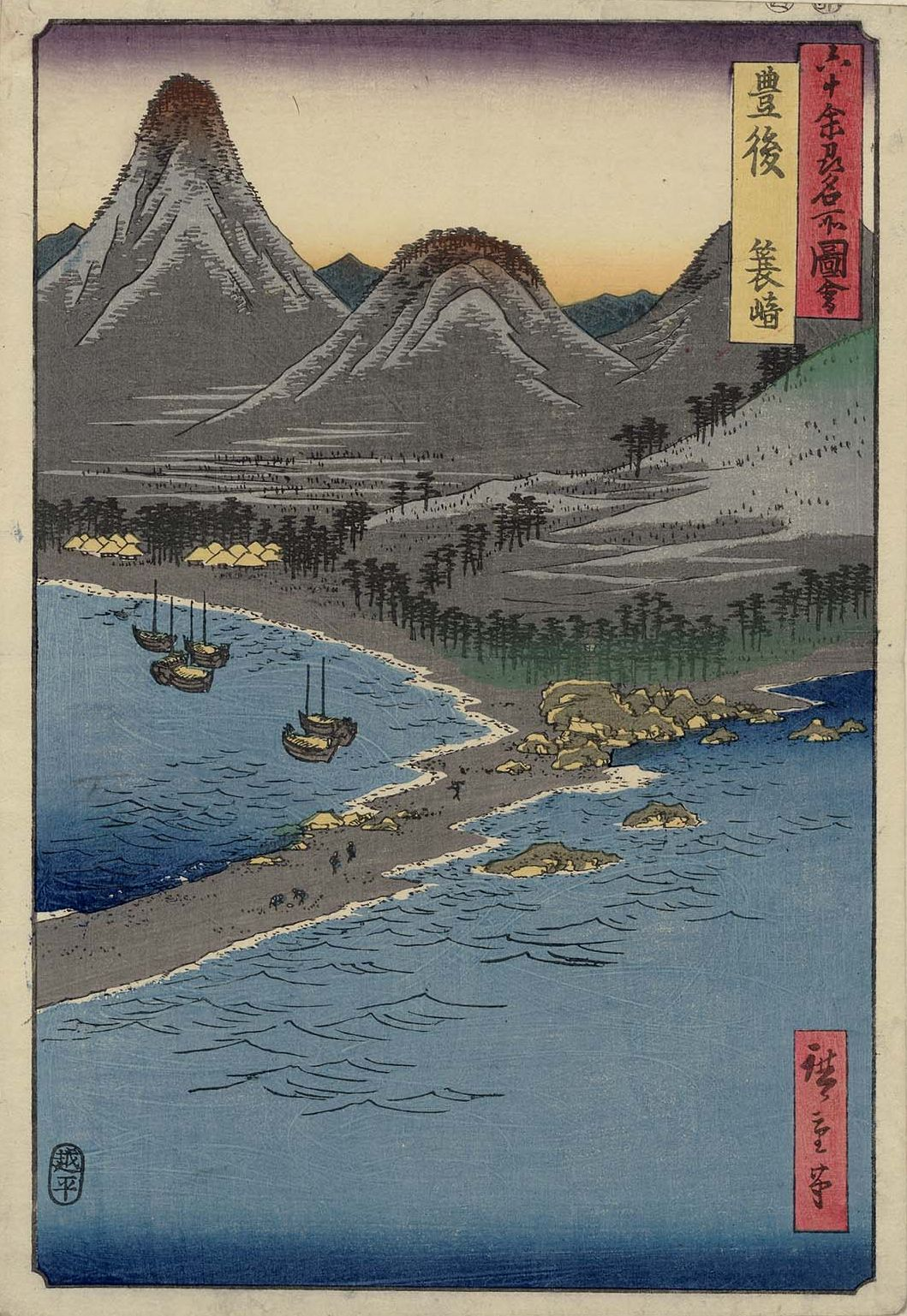
Hiroshige ukiyo-e "Bungo" in "The Famous Scenes of the Sixty States" (六十余州名所図会), depicting Minosaki in 1856

== History ==
=== Early history ===
During the Kofun period, the area of Bungo had three main power centers: the Kunisaki Peninsula, the area around what is now Ōita District and the area around Hita District, each of which was ruled by a kuni no miyatsuko. By the Asuka period, the area had been consolidated into a single province called Toyo Province, also called Toyokuni no Michi no Shiri. After the Taika Reforms and the establishment of the Ritsuryō system in 701, Toyo Province was divided into Bungo and Buzen Provinces. The Bungo no Kuni Fudoki, which was compiled in the first half of the 8th century, is one of only five fudoki in Japan that remains in almost complete form.

It is believed that the kokufu Bungo was located in the Furugō (古国府), literally "old capital," section of the city of Ōita, but as of 2023 no archaeological evidence has been found. Two shrines vie for the title of ichinomiya of Bungo Province: the Yusuhara Hachimangū and the Sasamuta Shrine, both of which are located in the city of Ōita, as is the Bungo Kokubun-ji. Usa Jingū, commonly known as "Usa Hachimangū", is often mistakenly stated to be the ichinomiya of the province, but it is located in former Buzen Province and not Bungo.

In 1185, at the end of the Heian period, after the Heike clan was destroyed in the Genpei War, Minamoto no Yoritomo established the Ōtomo clan as shugo over Bungo Province in order to suppress the pro-Taira clan samurai in Kyushu. The Ōtomo ruled the area from the Kamakura period into the Muromachi period and over the course of many conflicts expanded their control into neighboring provinces. The area saw an influx of western culture and technology with the influx of Portuguese traders in the Sengoku period, together with the introduction of firearms and Christianity. The Funai area became a center of Jesuit activity. Ōtomo Sōrin met personally with Francis Xavier in 1551, and later converted to Christianity. Referred to as the "King of Bungo" in the Jesuit records, Sōrin sent political delegations to Goa in the 1550s, and the Tenshō embassy to Rome in 1582. He also forced his subjects to convert. and ordered the destruction of Buddhist temples and Shinto shrines in his domains. In 1578, he came into conflict with the Shimazu clan to the south and after being defeated in a series of battles turned to Toyotomi Hideyoshi for assistance. In 1587, following Hideyoshi's iconquest of Kyūshū, Sōrin's son, Ōtomo Yoshimune was restored to control over Bungo. Following Hideyoshi's expulsion of foreign missionaries and edicts against the Kirishitan faith, he recanted his baptism and began a vigorous campaign to exterminate Christianity in the province. However, he subsequently was accused of cowardice during the Japanese invasions of Korea (1592–1598) and was dispossessed. Bungo was divided into small holdings.

=== Edo Period and early modern period ===
Unlike many of the provinces of Kyūshū, Bungo was not dominated by a single daimyō; rather, it was divided into tenryō territory directly governed by the Tokugawa shogunate and a number small feudal domains.

Bakumatsu period domains
Name	Clan	Type	kokudaka
Oka	Nakagawa	Tozama	70,000 koku
Usuki	Inaba	Tozama	50,000 koku
Kitsuki	Nomi-Matsudaira	Fudai	32,000 koku
Hiji	Kinoshita	Tozama	25,000 koku
Funai	Ogyū-Matsudaira	Fudai	22,200 koku
Saiki	Mōri	Tozama	20,000 koku
Mori	Kurushima	Tozama	12,500 koku

Following the Meiji restoration, each of the feudal domains briefly became prefectures. These were merged on December 25, 1871 to form Ōita Prefecture. Per the early Meiji period Kyudaka kyuryo Torishirabe-chō (旧高旧領取調帳), an official government assessment of the nation's resources, Bungo Province had 1812 villages with a total kokudaka of 466,611 koku. Bungo Province consisted of:

Districts of Bungo Province
District	kokudaka	villages	Controlled by
Kunisaki (国東郡)	81,339 koku	207 villages	Tenryō, Kitsuki, Nobeoka, Shimabara
Hayami (速見郡)	59,230 koku	123 villages	Tenryō, Kitsuki, Hiji, Nobeoka, Mori, Nobeoka
Ōita (大分郡)	71,302 koku	269 villages	Tenryō, Funai, Usuki, Mori, Kumamoto, Nobeoka
Amabe (海部郡)	62,275 koku	317 villages	Tenryō, Usuki, Saiki, Kumamoto
Ōno (大野郡)	72,685 koku	460 villages	Oka, Usuki
Naoiri (直入郡)	49,799 koku	303 villages	Tenryō, Oka, Kumamoto
Kusu (玖珠郡)	30,841 koku	40 villages	Tenryō, Mori
Hita (日田郡)	33,076 koku	93 villages	Tenryō, Mori

== Gallery ==
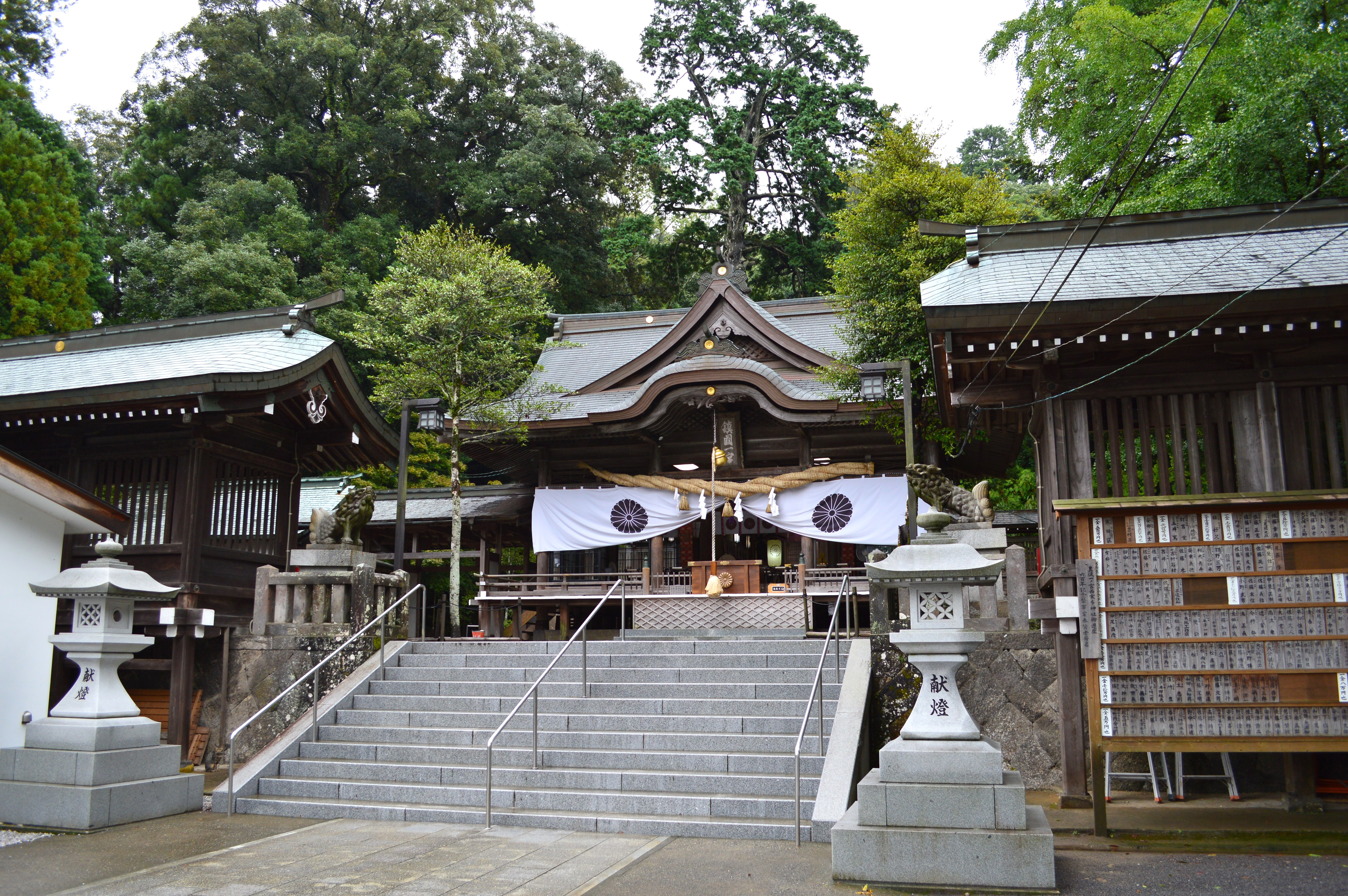
Sasamuta Jinja, one of the ichinomiya of the province

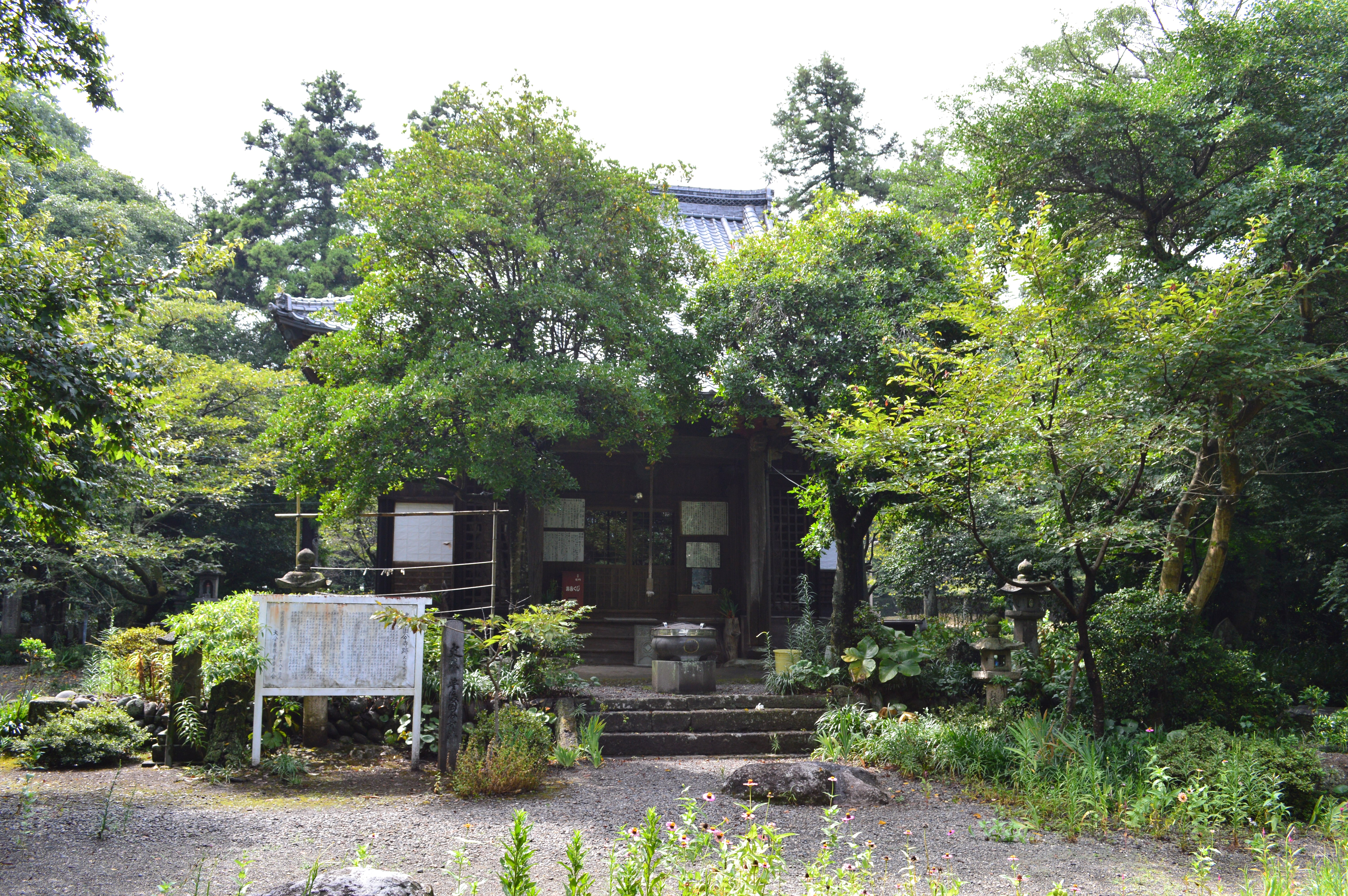
Bungo Kokubun-ji

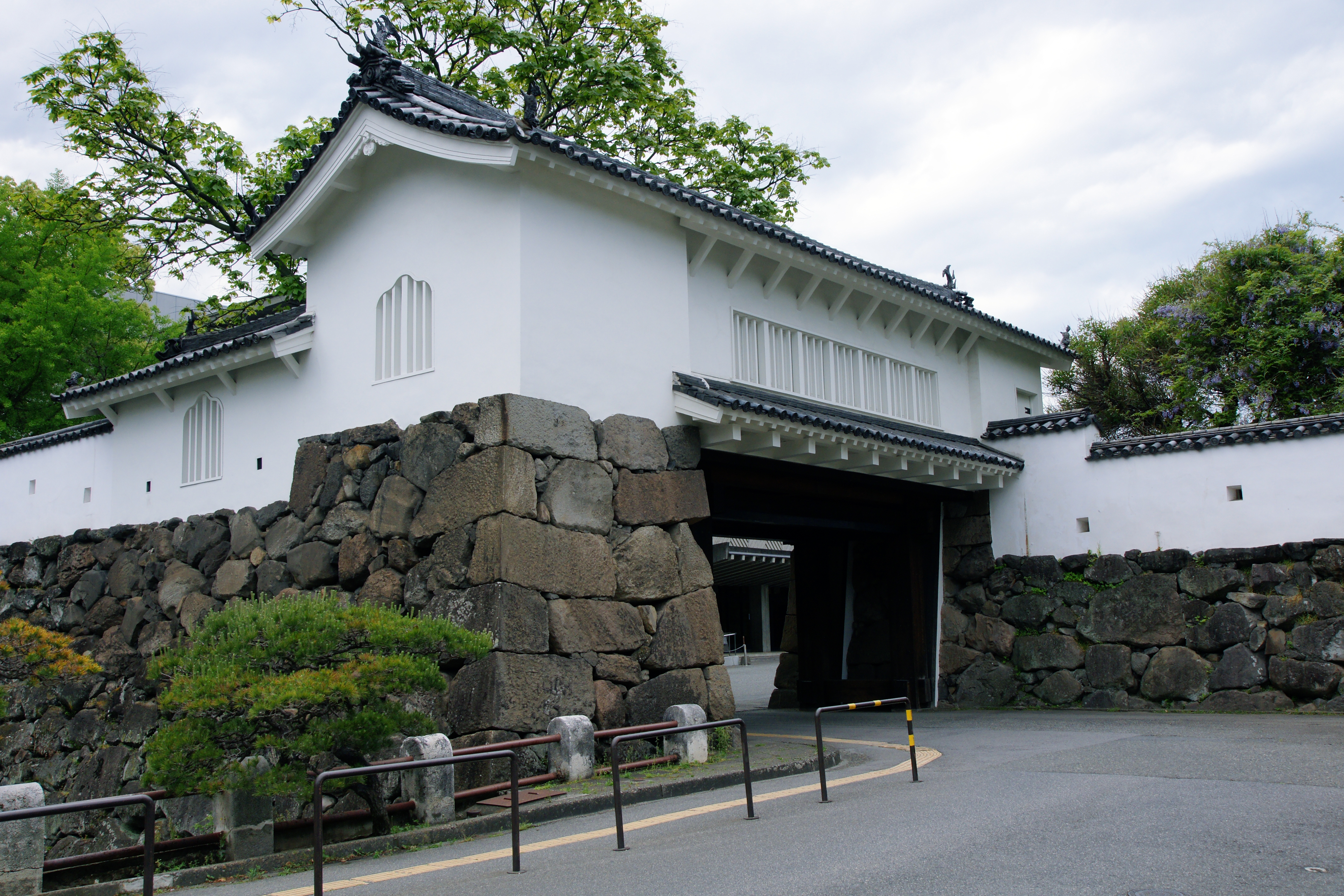
Funai Castle

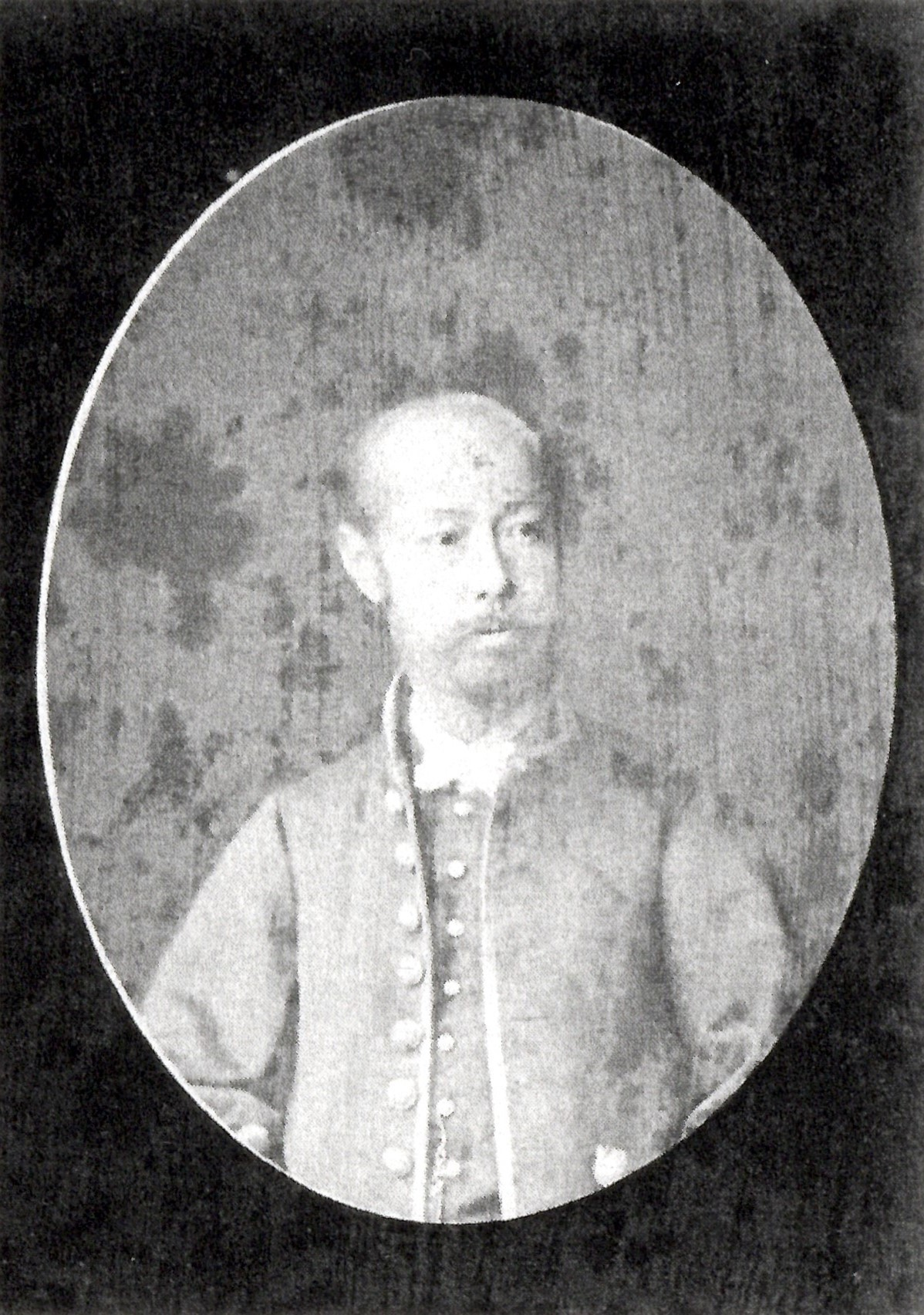
Kinoshita Toshimasa, final daimyō of Hiji Domain
