= Itō Mancio =

Japanese Jesuit

- 伊東 マンショ
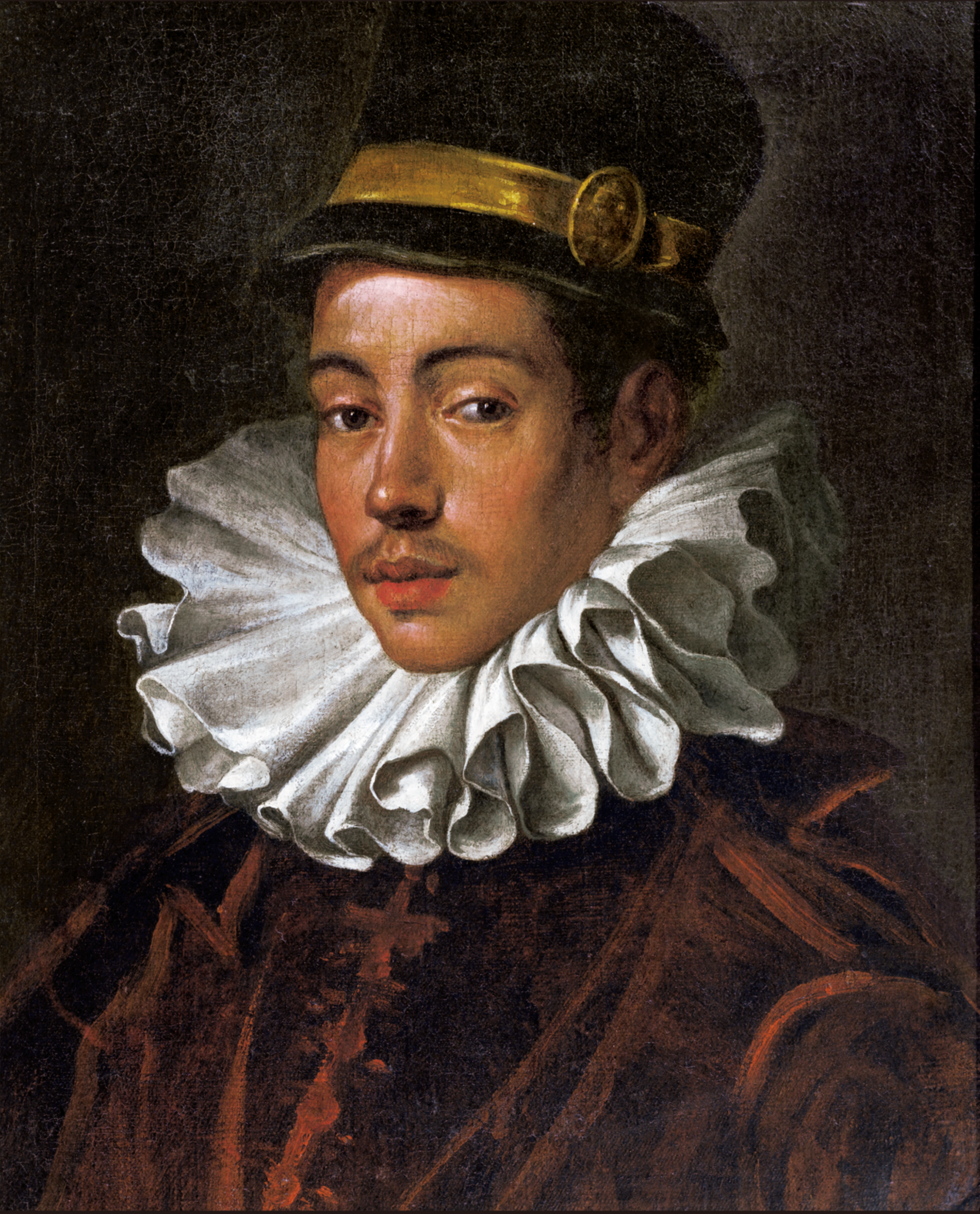
- Itō Mancio, by Italian painter Domenico Tintoretto (1585)
- Born: Itō Sukemasu; January 1, 1569; Hyūga Province, Tonokōri, Japan
- Died: November 13, 1612 (aged 43); Nagasaki, Japan
- Occupations: Head of Tenshō embassy; Jesuit; Catholic priest
- Years active: 1582–1612
- Parents: Itō Sukeharu (伊東祐青) (father); Ito Machinoue (町の上) (mother)
- Family: Itō clan, Itō Yoshisuke (grandfather)

Itō Mancio (Itō Mansho, 伊東 マンショ, c.1569 – 13 November 1612) was a Japanese Jesuit, head of the Tenshō embassy; the first Japanese diplomatic mission to Europe, and a Catholic priest.

== Early life ==
He was born in Hyūga Province, Tonokōri (now Saito, Miyazaki) to a noble family in 1569. His official birthname was Itō Sukemasu (伊東 祐益). His father was Itō Sukeharu (伊東祐青) and his mother was Machinoue (町の上) the daughter of daimyo Itō Yoshisuke. He was a member of the Itō clan.

== Career ==
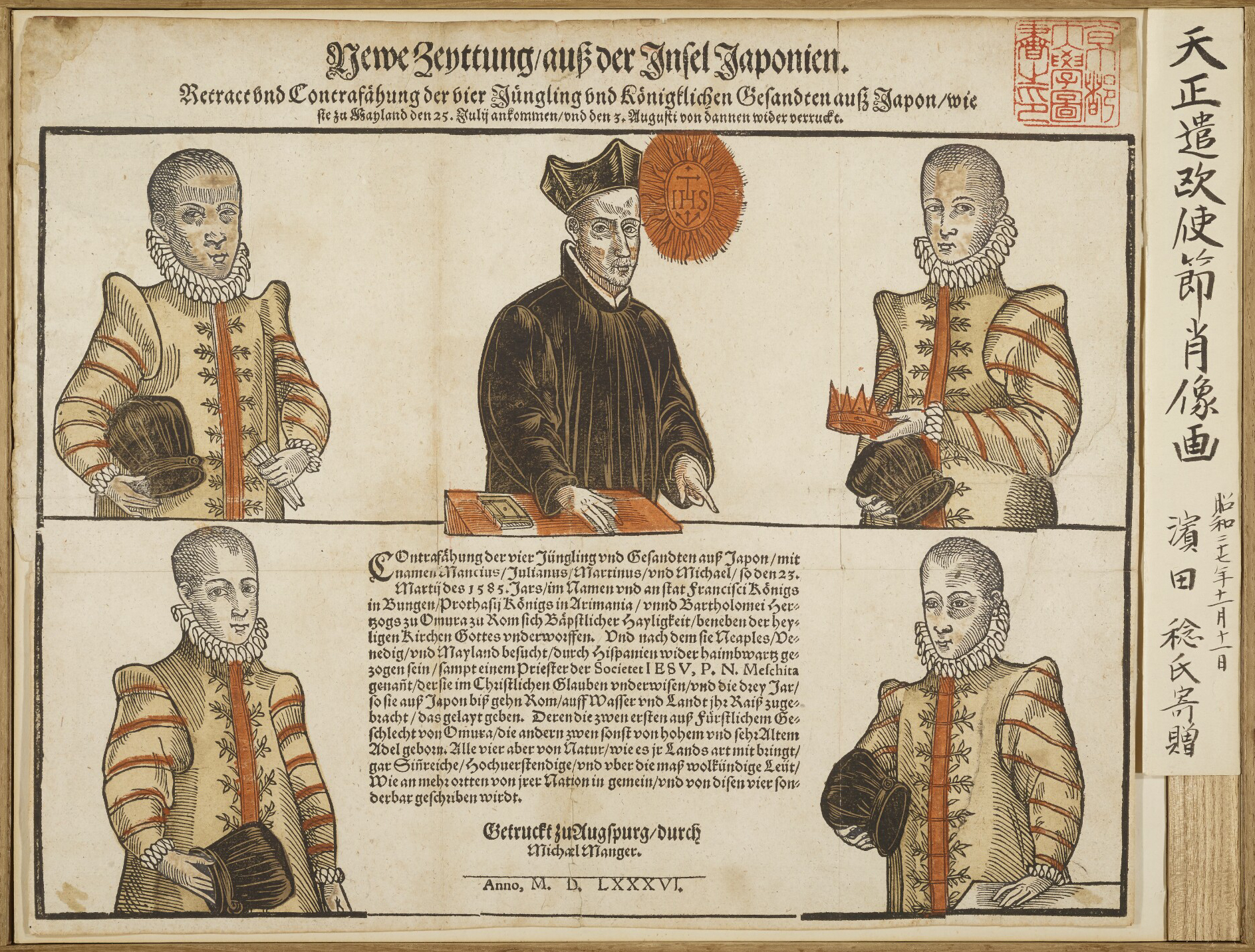
Japanese Embassy to Europe, 1586. The person in the upper right is Itō Mancio

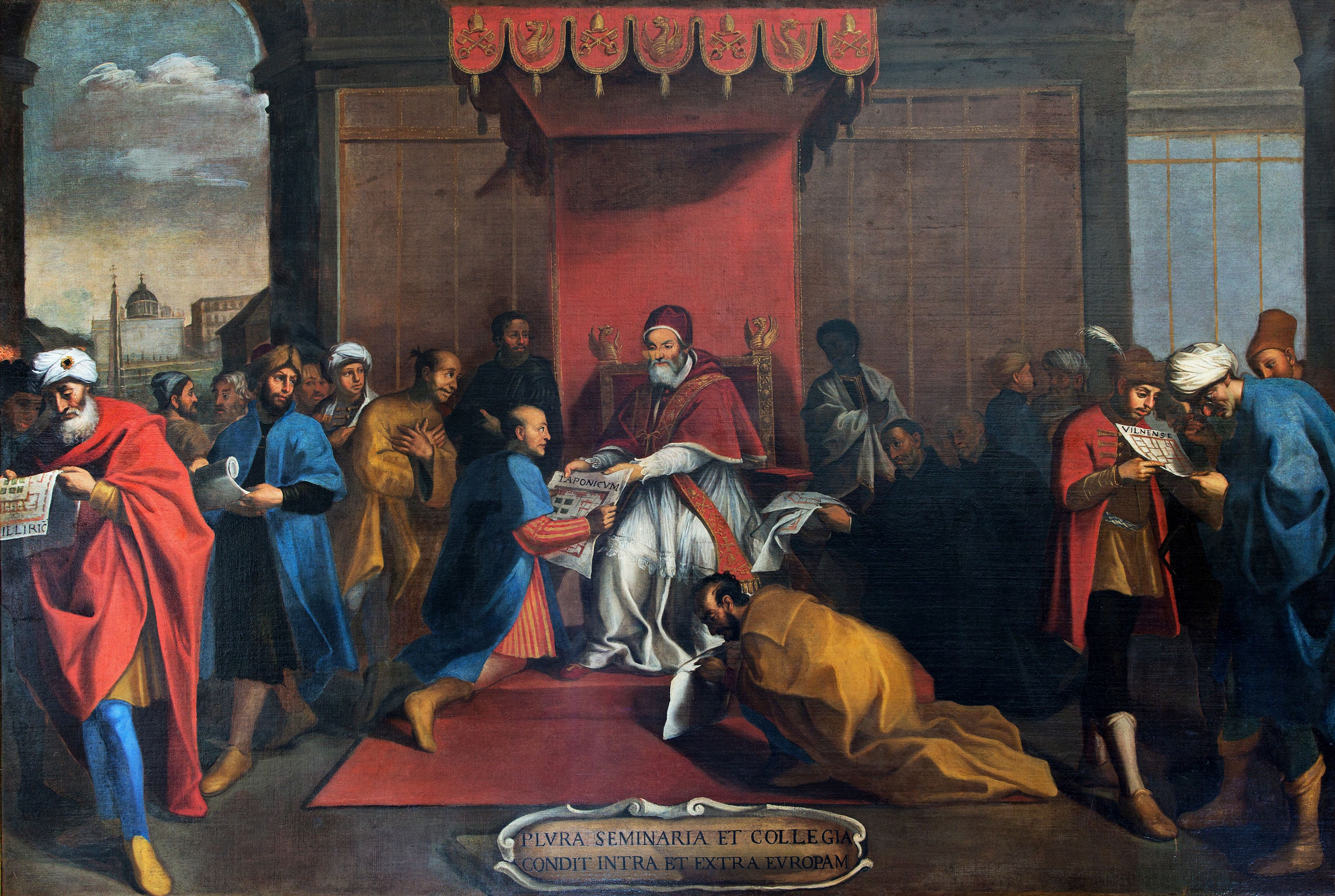
Audience scene of Itō Mancio and Pope Gregory XIII in 1585

Itō Mancio studied theology and Latin at the seminary in Nagasaki. As leader of the Tenshō embassy (1582–90) he traveled to Europe where he met Popes Gregory XIII and Sixtus V in Rome.

The idea of sending a Japanese embassy to Europe was originally conceived by the Jesuit Alessandro Valignano. and sponsored by the Christian daimyō Ōtomo Sōrin, Ōmura Sumitada and Arima Harunobu. Itō Sukemasu was placed at the head of the group by Ōtomo, daimyō of the Bungo Province of Kyūshū and close relative of Sukemasu's father, Itō Shurinosuke.

In 1580 Itō was baptized with the name Mancio (Mansho, マンショ). On February 20, 1582 Itō left Nagasaki in the company of three other nobles: Michele Chijiwa, Giuliano Nakaura and Martino Hara. They were accompanied by two servants and their tutor and interpreter Diego de Mesquita, as well as by Valignano himself, who escorted them to Goa in India before taking on a new post. On the way to Lisbon they spent nine months between Macau, Kochi and Goa. From Lisbon they left for Rome, the main destination of the trip. In Rome Mancio was nominated honorary citizen and adorned with the title of Order of the Golden Spur. During the return journey from Rome they headed for Venice and along the way they stopped for a day in Imola (June 18, 1585). A manuscript was drawn up in their honor and as evidence of the event, which is still preserved in the municipal historical archive of the city.

The ambassadors returned to Japan on 21 July 1590. During their stay in Europe the group met King Philip II of Spain, the Grand Duke of Tuscany Francesco I de 'Medici, Pope Gregory XIII and his successor, Sixtus V.

== Later life ==
Joining the order of Jesuit priests in 1608 he engaged in missionary work in northwest Japan but soon was expelled from the local Kokura domain and then moved to the Nakatsu Domain. He was finally exiled to Nagasaki and became a teacher at the seminary. Mancio died of an illness in Nagasaki in 1612, at the age of 43.

== Portrait ==
A portrait depicting Itō Mancio was discovered in 2008 and entrusted to the care of experts who identified its authenticity and attributed its creation to Domenico Tintoretto. The painting, an oil on canvas 53 centimeters high by 43 centimeters wide, depicted a young man with oriental features dressed in the Spanish fashion of the late sixteenth century, with a brown suit, black hat and white ruff. On the back of the work there was the inscription «D. MANSIO NIPOTE DEL RE DI FIGENGA AMB[asciator]E DEL RE FRA[nces]CO BVGNOCINGVA A SUA SAN[tit]A. MCXXCV. DGH 393».

The painting was commissioned by the Senate of Venice to Jacopo Tintoretto in 1585 on the occasion of the passage of the ambassadors in the city. In reality, the portrait was made by his son Domenico, remaining in stock in the Tintorette workshop until the Spanish collector Gaspar Méndez de Haro, Marquis del Carpio, bought the entire collection of the two artists. Due to his debts, however, he was forced to sell all his assets and the work ended up in the hands of the Florentine banker Giovanni Francesco del Rosso who in turn ceded it to the Rinuccini family of Florence. In 1831 Marianna Rinuccini married Giorgio Teodoro Trivulzio, bringing as a dowry the portrait of Itō Mancio into the Trivulzio collection in Milan.

The painting was restored in 2009 and exhibited in Tokyo, Nagasaki and Miyazaki (Mancio's place of origin) on the occasion of the celebrations of the 150th anniversary of the beginning of diplomatic relations between Italy and Japan in 2016.

== See also ==
- Hasekura Tsunenaga
- Christianity in Japan

== Bibliography ==
- C. R. Boxer: The Christian Century in Japan 1549-1650. Carcanet Press, ISBN 1-85754-035-2

Primary sources

- Guido Gualtieri, ed. (1586). Relationi della venuta degli ambasciatori Giaponesi a Roma sino alla partita di Lisbona. Zannetti.
- Paolo Meietto (1585). Relatione del viaggio et arrivo in Evropa et Roma de' principi giapponesi: venuti à dare obedienza à Sua Santità l'anno MDLXXXV all'Eccell. Sig. Girolamo Mercvriale. Venezia.
- Duarte de Sande (1590). De missione legatorum Iaponensium ad Romanam Curiam (in Latin).

Secondary sources

- "Japan Quarterly". The Asahi Shimbun.
- Benzoni, Maria Matilde (2012). Americhe e modernità. Un itinerario fra storia e storiografia dal 1492 ad oggi. Franco Angeli Edizioni. ISBN 978-88-204-0408-6.
- Gunji, Yasunori. "La missione degli Ambasciatori Giapponesi del 1985 a Bagnaia" (PDF). Biblioteca Consorziale Viterbo.
- Iannello, Tiziana (2013). "Una legazione giapponese alla corte di Alfonso II d'Este (22-25 giugno 1585): documenti e testimonianze". Il Giappone. Vol. LI. pp. 22–50.
- Massarella, Dereck (February 2013). "The Japanese Embassy to Europe" (PDF). The Journal of the Hakluyt Society. ISSN 0072-9396. Archived from the original (PDF) on August 26, 2014. Estratto dal libro di Duarte de Sande (2013). Dereck Massarella (ed.). Japanese Travellers in Sixteenth-Century Europe: A Dialogue Concerning the Mission of the Japanese Ambassadors to the Roman Curia (1590). Ashgate Publishing. ISBN 978-1-4094-7223-0.
- Luigi Mezzadri (2006). La Chiesa tra Rinascimento e illuminismo. Città Nuova. ISBN 88-311-0340-7.
- Murdoch, James (2004). A History of Japan. Vol. 2. Psychology Press. ISBN 978-0-415-15416-1.
- Musillo, Marco (2012). "Travelers from Afar through Civic Spaces: The Tenshō Embassy in Renaissance Italy". In Christina H. Lee (ed.). Western Visions of the Far East in a Transpacific Age, 1522–1657. Ashgate Publishing. ISBN 978-1-4094-0850-5.
- Nussbaum, Louis-Frédéric (2002). Japan Encyclopedia. Harvard University Press. pp. 405–406. ISBN 978-0-674-01753-5.
- Schütte, Josef Franz. Valignano's mission principles for Japan (5th ed.). Institute of Jesuit Sources.
- Sestili, Daniele (2001). "La prima introduzione della musica europea in Giappone tra Cinque e Seicento". In A. Boscaro; e M. Bossi (eds.). Firenze, il Giappone e l'Asia orientale. Atti del Convegno internazionale di studi (Firenze, 25-27 marzo 1999) Copertina flessibile – 1 aprile 2001. Firenze: Olschki. pp. 57–65. doi:10.1400/186692. ISBN 88-222-4998-4.
