= Hyūga Provincial Capital =

Hyūga Provincial Capital ruins
- 日向国府跡 (Japanese)
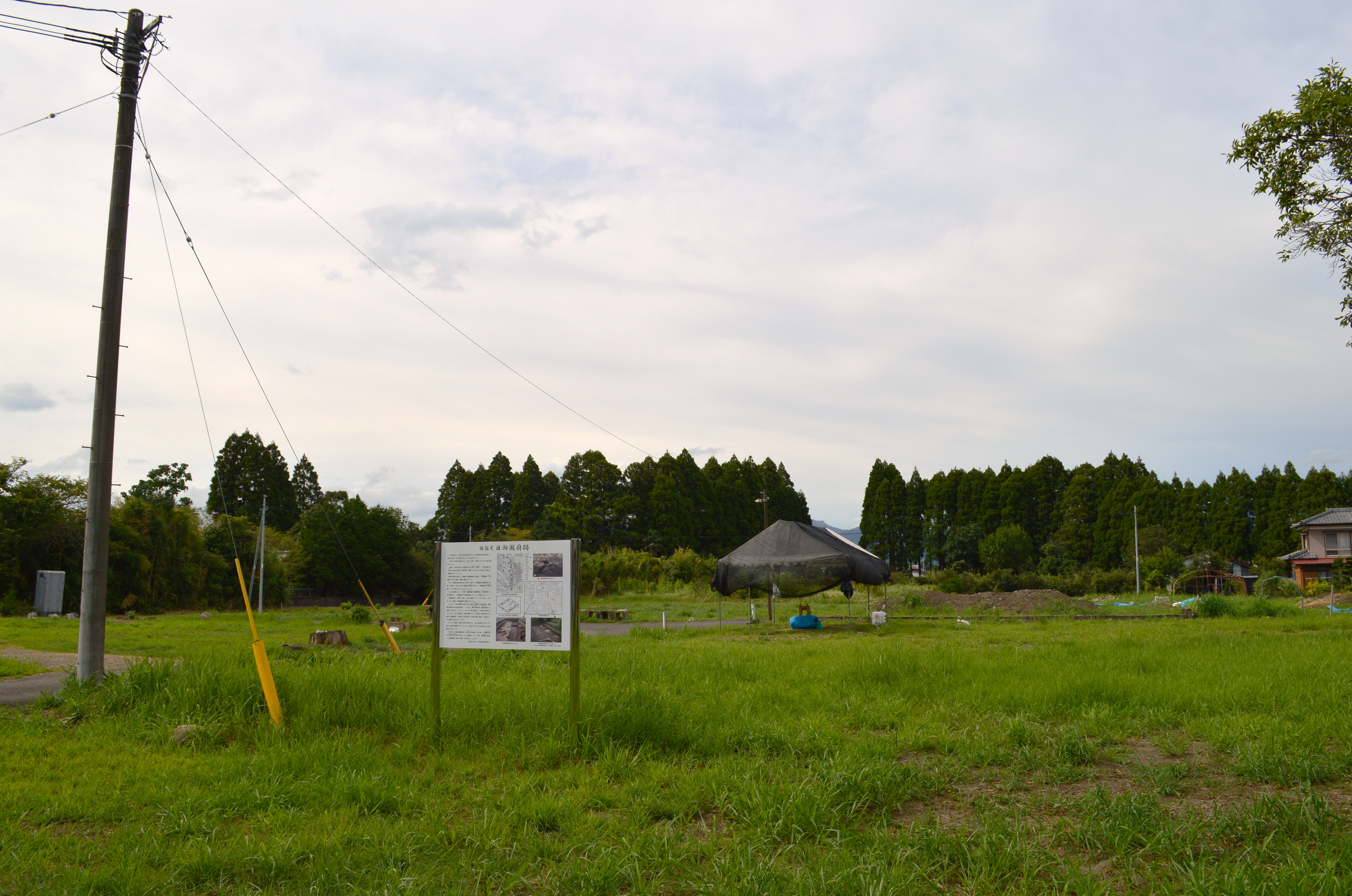
- Hyūga Provincial Capital ruins

- Shimotsuke Provincial Capital ruins Hyūga Provincial Capital (Japan)
- 32°06′53″N 131°24′04″E
- Periods: Nara - Heian period
- Location: Saito, Miyazaki, Japan
- Region: Kyushu

Site notes
- Condition: 32°06′52″N 131°24′04″E
- Public access: Yes

The Hyūga Provincial Capital ruins (日向国府跡, Hyūga kokufu ato) is an archaeological site with the ruins of a Nara to Heian period government administrative complex located in what is now the Migimatsu neighborhood of the city of Saito, Miyazaki prefecture in the island of Kyushu, Japan. Identified as the ruins of the kokufu (provincial capital) of Hyūga Province, the site was protected by the national government as a National Historic Site since 2005.

== Overview ==
In the late Nara period, after the establishment of a centralized government under the Ritsuryō system, local rule over the provinces was standardized under a kokufu (provincial capital), and each province was divided into smaller administrative districts, known as (郡, gun, kōri), composed of 2–20 townships in 715 AD. The kokufu complex contained the official residence and offices of the kokushi, the official sent from the central government as provincial governor, along with buildings housing offices concerned with general administration, farming, finance, police and military. In the periphery there was a provincial school (kokugaku), the garrison and storehouses for taxes.

The Hyūga Kokufu ruins are located on a river terrace formed by the Hitotsuse River, almost in the center of Miyazaki Prefecture. There are many ruins scattered around the area, including the ruins of Hyūga Kokubun-ji provincial temple, Tsuma Shrine and the Saitobaru Kofun Cluster. There were various theories about the location of the Hyūga Kokufu, but excavations conducted from 1985 to 2000 by the Miyazaki Prefectural Board of Education at the Terasaki ruins, which was one of the most likely locations, confirmed parts of the foundations of a central building, including a side hall, and earthen palisades to the north, west and south, in the standardized "kokufu layout". Approximately one hectare of the center of the site was designated as a national historic site in 2005 due to its importance in considering the political situation of ancient Hyūga. The buildings were arranged with the main hall on the north side and side halls to the east and west in a "U" configuration.The main building was rebuilt from a dug-out pillar building to a cornerstone building. These buildings are thought to have been constructed between the end of the 8th century and reconstructed several times, the last of which was in the first half of the 10th century. The roof is presumed to have been tiled, and a large number of fragments of roof tiles and pottery have been unearthed, including items that show evidence of a government office, such as Kinai-style Haji ware pottery, inkstones, and pottery with ink inscriptions.

The site is approximately 12 kilometers to the west of Hyūga-Shintomi Station on the JR Kyushu Nippō Main Line.

== See also ==
- List of Historic Sites of Japan (Miyazaki)
