= Obi Castle =

- 飫肥城
- Nichinan, Miyazaki
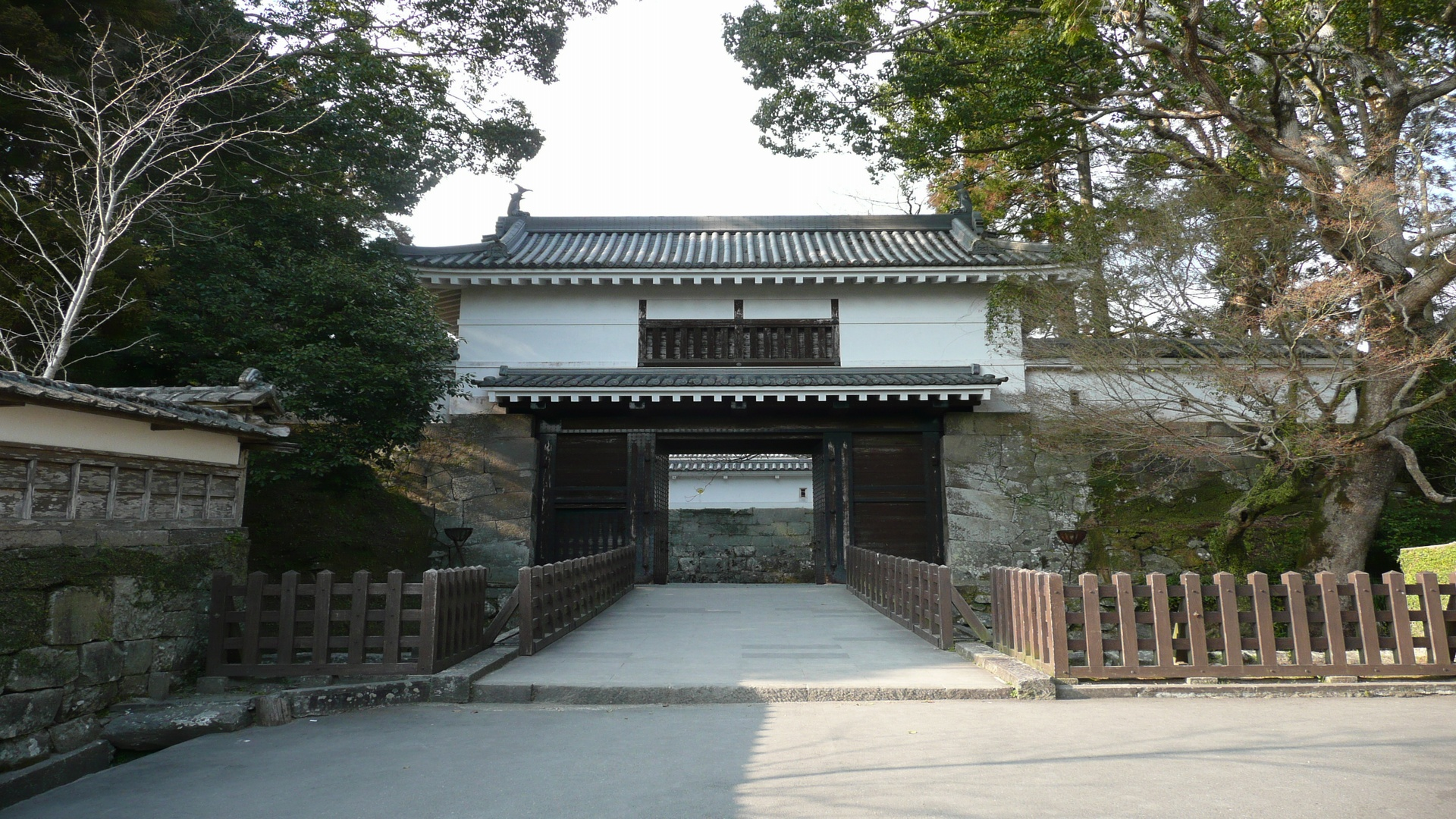
- Castle Entrance

Location
- Coordinates: 31.629106°N 131.350303°E

Site history
- Built: 1588 (finished)
- Built by: Tsuchimochi clan, Itō Suketaka
- In use: 1588 to 1871
- Materials: Earth, stone, and wood

Obi Castle is a Japanese castle originally completed in 1588. It was the center of the old Obi Domain, now a part of Miyazaki Prefecture.

== History ==
Obi Castle was founded by the Tsuchimochi clan in the Nanboku-chō period, but most of its structure comes from the mid-1400s.

It featured prominently in conflicts between the Itō and Shimazu clans. The castle was in initially in Shimazu hands, until it was lost to the Itō clan in 1587. The Itō clan continued to rule it until the Meiji period, expanding it and making it more defensible, with the castle town protected on three sides by the Sakatani river.

After some neglect, the castle was completely refurbished in 1978.

During the castle refurbishment, work was also done on the castle town. Refurbishing the town brought it into line, in terms of historical authenticity, with the era of the castle, making both authentically reflective of a castle town dating from the Edo period.
