= Tonokōri Castle =

Castle in Miyazaki, Japan

- 都於郡城
- Saito, Miyazaki Japan

Site information
- Type: yamajiro-style Japanese castle
- Controlled by: Itō clan, Shimazu clan
- Open to the public: yes
- Condition: Archaeological and designated national historical site; castle ruins

Location
- Coordinates: 32°3′38.200″N 131°22′29.302″E

Site history
- Built: 1335
- Built by: Itō Sukemochi
- In use: Sengoku period
- National Historic Site of Japan

Tonokōri Castle (都於郡城, Tonokōri-jō) was a Sengoku period yamajiro-style Japanese castle located in the Tonokōri neighborhood of the city of Saito, Miyazaki Prefecture, Japan. It was also known as Ukibune Castle (浮船城). Its ruins have been protected as a National Historic Site since 2000.

== Overview ==
Tonokōri Castle is located on a plateau at an elevation of approximately 100 meters on the right bank of the Sanzai River, a tributary of the Hitotsuse River, in the southern part of the city. Surrounded by steep cliffs, the river acts as an outer moat to the west and north. The castle consisted of five enclosures, each surrounded by earthen ramparts and separated by a deep moat. The total length of the moats exceeded four kilometers, and the castle defenses were supplement by five outlying forts on neighboring hills.

The castle was built by Itō Sukemochi in 1335 or 1337, after he was awarded estates in the area from Ashikaga Takauji. The Itō clan controlled central Hyūga Province from the Nanboku-chō period to the Sengoku period, and under Sukemochi's son Itō Sukeshige this castle became the clan's main stronghold. It was the center of network of 48 fortifications constructed at various locations in the Itō domains, which gradually expanded to cover most of Hyūga Province. The castle is known to have suffered four fires due to battles and accidents, but in the great fire that occurred on March 5, 1504, the conflagration that started inside the castle spread to the jōkamachi, destroying many buildings.

The Itō were challenged by the aggressive Shimazu clan to the south. After many conflicts, the Itō suffered a crushing defeat at the hands of Shimazu Yoshihisa in 1577 at the Battle of Kizaki and were forced to flee Hyūga with the assistance of Ōtomo Sōrin. Tonokōri Castle was occupied by the Shimazu. After the establishment of the Edo period Tokugawa Shogunate, the castle came within the borders of Sadowara Domain, which was ruled by a cadet branch of the Shimazu clan. It was destroyed in 1615 in accordance with the shogunate's "one castle per domain" laws.

The site is now in completely overgrown ruins. Archaeological excavations have found many postholes in the enclosures, indicating that many structures were rebuilt multiple times during the 200-odd years of the Itō clan's control. Fragments of imported ceramics from the 15th and 16th centuries have also been unearthed. The site is approximately 35 minutes by car from Sadowara Station on the JR Kyushu Nippō Main Line.

== See also ==
- List of Historic Sites of Japan (Miyazaki)

== Literature ==
- Benesch, Oleg and Ran Zwigenberg (2019). Japan's Castles: Citadels of Modernity in War and Peace. Cambridge: Cambridge University Press. p. 374. ISBN 9781108481946.
- De Lange, William (2021). An Encyclopedia of Japanese Castles. Groningen: Toyo Press. pp. 600 pages. ISBN 978-9492722300.
