= Saito, Miyazaki =

Saito 西都市
- City
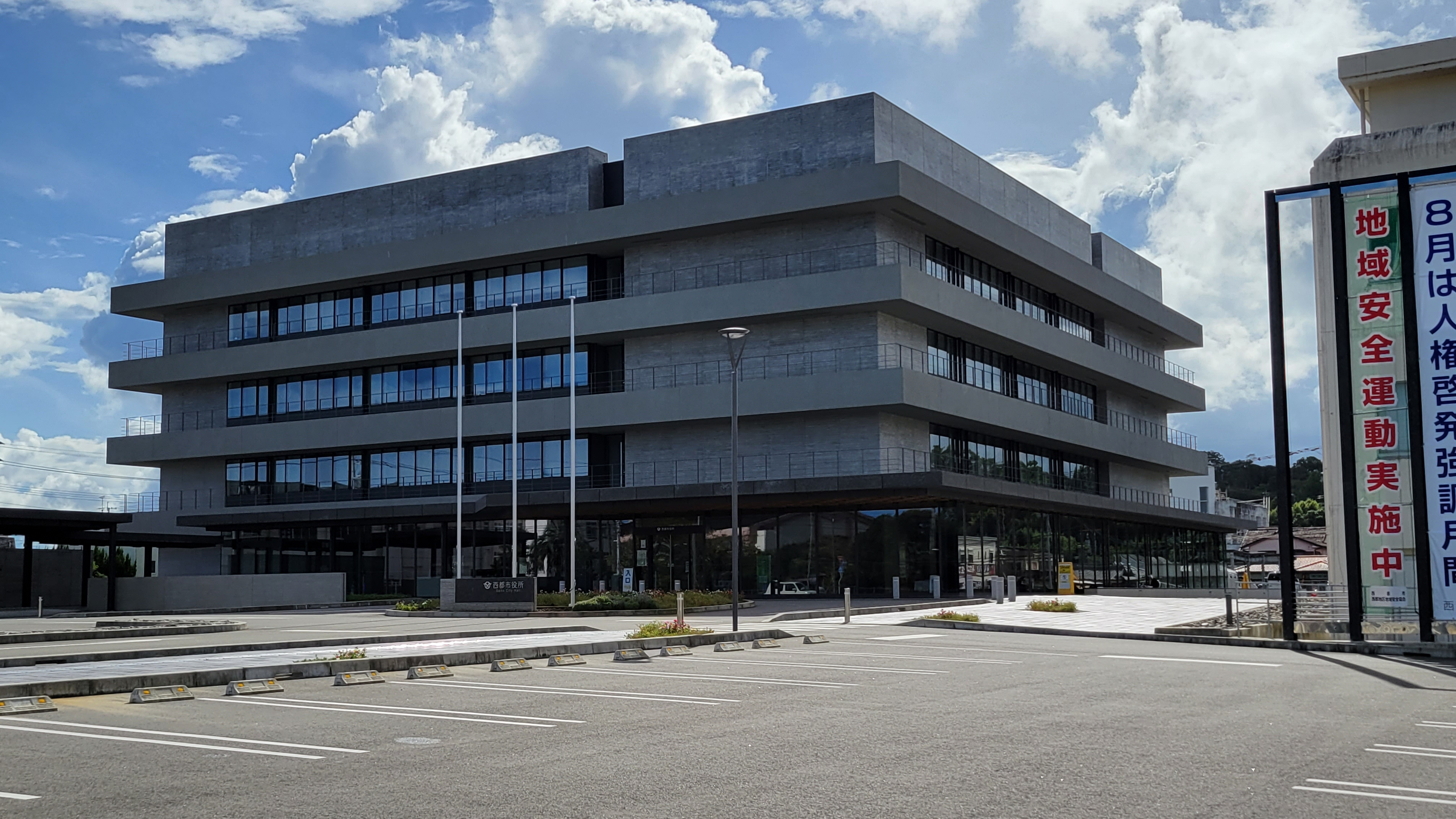
- Saito City Hall

- Flag Seal
- Location of Saito in Miyazaki Prefecture

- Location in Japan
- Coordinates: 32°06′31″N 131°24′05″E
- Country: Japan
- Region: Kyushu
- Prefecture: Miyazaki

Government
  - Mayor: Shuichirō Oshikawa (from February 2017)

Area
  - Total: 438.79 km^{2} (169.42 sq mi)

Population (November 1, 2023)
  - Total: 28,538
  - Density: 65.038/km^{2} (168.45/sq mi)
- Time zone: UTC+09:00 (JST)
- Postal code(s): 881-0000
- City hall address: 2-1 Seiryo-cho, Saito-shi, Miyazaki-ken 881-8501
- Climate: Cfa
- Website: city.saito.miyazaki.jp
- Symbols
- Bird: Japanese Bush Warbler
- Flower: Azalea
- Tree: Japanese Bayberry

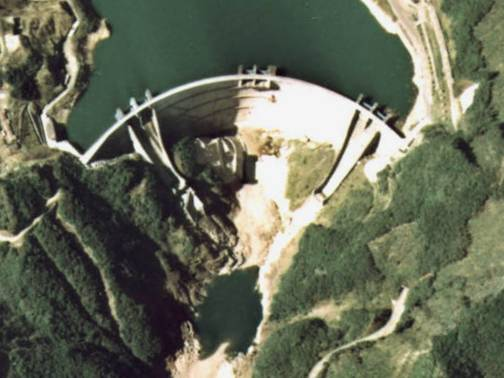
Hitotsuse Dam (1976)

Saito (西都市, Saito-shi) is a city located in Miyazaki Prefecture, Japan. As of 1 November 2023, the city had an estimated population of 28,538 in 13964 households, and a population density of 65 persons per km^{2}. The total area of the city is 438.79 km^{2} (169.42 sq mi).

== Geography ==
Saito is the 5th largest city in the Miyazaki prefecture. 70% of the city is mountainous, and the Hitotsuse River cuts through the city from northwest to southeast. Many other smaller streams cut through the valleys in Saito. Much of the city is covered by mountains and forest (approximately 80%).

- Mountains: Higuchi Yama (樋口山), Soubugaku (掃部岳)
- Rivers: Hitotsuse gawa (一ツ瀬川), Sakura Kawa (桜川)
- Lakes and Marshes: Komeryoujinzouko (米良人造湖), Chigokeike (稚児ケ池)
- Dams: Hitotsuse Dam (一ツ瀬ダム, Hitotsuse Damu)

=== Neighboring municipalities ===
Miyazaki Prefecture

- Kijo
- Kunitomi
- Nango
- Sadowara
- Shiiba
- Shintomi
- Takanabe

=== Climate ===
Saito has a humid subtropical climate (Köppen climate classification Cfa) with hot, humid summers and cool winters. The average annual temperature in Saito is 17.2 °C (63.0 °F). The average annual rainfall is 2,547.3 mm (100.29 in) with June as the wettest month. The temperatures are highest on average in August, at around 27.4 °C (81.3 °F), and lowest in January, at around 6.8 °C (44.2 °F). The highest temperature ever recorded in Saito was 39.3 °C (102.7 °F) on 1 August 2026; the coldest temperature ever recorded was −7.7 °C (18.1 °F) on 27 February 1981.

Climate data for Saito (1991−2020 normals, extremes 1977−present)
Month	Jan	Feb	Mar	Apr	May	Jun	Jul	Aug	Sep	Oct	Nov	Dec	Year
Record high °C (°F)	25.1 (77.2)	25.1 (77.2)	30.2 (86.4)	31.4 (88.5)	34.0 (93.2)	35.2 (95.4)	38.4 (101.1)	39.3 (102.7)	37.1 (98.8)	33.0 (91.4)	29.4 (84.9)	24.6 (76.3)	39.3 (102.7)
Mean daily maximum °C (°F)	13.2 (55.8)	14.2 (57.6)	17.0 (62.6)	21.3 (70.3)	24.9 (76.8)	27.0 (80.6)	31.5 (88.7)	32.3 (90.1)	29.3 (84.7)	25.0 (77.0)	20.1 (68.2)	15.1 (59.2)	22.6 (72.6)
Daily mean °C (°F)	6.8 (44.2)	8.3 (46.9)	11.6 (52.9)	16.0 (60.8)	19.9 (67.8)	22.8 (73.0)	26.8 (80.2)	27.4 (81.3)	24.5 (76.1)	19.5 (67.1)	14.0 (57.2)	8.7 (47.7)	17.2 (62.9)
Mean daily minimum °C (°F)	1.1 (34.0)	2.6 (36.7)	6.3 (43.3)	10.7 (51.3)	15.1 (59.2)	19.2 (66.6)	23.0 (73.4)	23.6 (74.5)	20.7 (69.3)	14.7 (58.5)	8.7 (47.7)	3.0 (37.4)	12.4 (54.3)
Record low °C (°F)	−7.1 (19.2)	−7.7 (18.1)	−4.0 (24.8)	0.5 (32.9)	6.5 (43.7)	11.5 (52.7)	14.9 (58.8)	16.5 (61.7)	10.2 (50.4)	3.2 (37.8)	−2.3 (27.9)	−5.9 (21.4)	−7.7 (18.1)
Average precipitation mm (inches)	70.3 (2.77)	96.1 (3.78)	166.3 (6.55)	202.4 (7.97)	237.0 (9.33)	507.1 (19.96)	340.4 (13.40)	272.8 (10.74)	321.5 (12.66)	166.0 (6.54)	99.4 (3.91)	68.1 (2.68)	2,547.3 (100.29)
Average precipitation days (≥ 1.0 mm)	6.0	7.1	10.7	10.3	10.9	16.3	11.5	12.4	12.3	8.0	7.6	5.6	118.7
Mean monthly sunshine hours	184.1	169.3	184.0	186.2	177.7	111.2	187.3	199.3	153.0	175.0	162.7	177.5	2,067.3
Source: Japan Meteorological Agency

=== Demographics ===
Per Japanese census data, the population of Saito in 2020 is 28,610 people. Saito has been conducting censuses since 1920.

Historical population

Year	Pop.	±%
1960	50,138	—
1965	42,543	−15.1%
1970	38,509	−9.5%
1975	37,054	−3.8%
1980	37,836	+2.1%
1985	38,370	+1.4%
1990	37,218	−3.0%

Year	Pop.	±%
1995	36,331	−2.4%
2000	35,381	−2.6%
2005	34,087	−3.7%
2010	32,617	−4.3%
2015	30,683	−5.9%
2020	28,610	−6.8%

Saito population statistics

== History ==
The area of Saito was part of ancient Hyūga Province. Per the Kojiki and the Nihon Shoki, Amaterasu's grandson Ninigi descended from the heavens to Mount Takachiho, and resided in what is now Saito. The area was densely populated in the Kofun period and has the largest accumulation of ancient burial mounds in Japan. During the Asuka and Nara periods, the Hyūga Provincial Capital and Hyūga Kokubun-ji were located in what is now the center of Saito City. During the Muromachi period the Ito clan ruled the area from their stronghold at Tonokōri Castle in the southern part of the city. During the Edo period, the area was largely divided between the holdings of Takanabe Domain and Sadowara Domain. Following the Meiji restoration, the area was organized into villages within Koyu District, Miyazaki on May 1, 1889, with the creation of the modern municipalities system.

Year	Month Day	Event
1924	April 1	Koyugunshimohokita Village (児湯郡下穂北 ) became Shimohokita( 下穂北) Town.
1924	August 1	Koyugunshimohokita Town became Tsuma Town
1952	March 29	Saitobaru Burial Mounds appointed a special historical place
1953	July 22	The Hibi (日肥) line (Hitoyoshi – Tsuma National Railway bus) opened to traffic。
1958	April 1	Koyogun—Saito Town, Sanzai Village and Tonokori Village were abolished and replaced by Saito City.
1958	September 1	Saitobaru and Sugiyasu gorge were appointed as prefectural parks
1958	November 1	Koyugun—Saito Town became Saito City (And the city was founded).
1962	April 1	Saito City, Sanzai Village and Higashinishimera village amalgamated.
1963	January 24	A large fire on Heisuke (平助通) Street damages 100 houses, injures 418 and kills 4 people.
1963	June 4	Kyūshū Electric Company's Hitotsuse plant completed.
1964	October 27	The Shimozuruusu Taiko Dance appeared in a folk art public performance at the Tokyo Olympics.
1966	November 17	The Fuudoki Hill (風土記の丘) Project began, a project to turn the Saitobaru Burial Mounds into a public park.
1971	October 8	The Shimozuruusu Taiko dance was appointed a national cultural asset
1979	October 16	The Emperor visited Saitobaru
1981	March 10	Ohae kagura was appointed a prefectural cultural asset
1984	November 30	National Railway's Tsuma line closes after 70 years in service, leaving neighbouring town Sadowara to the west as the closest station on the JR Railway.
1988	July 1	Sugiyasu River Nakashima Park Opened
1994	November 28	Mokuzo Yamaji Bishamonten appointed as a prefectural cultural asset
1995	May 29	Construction began on the Saito-Kiyotake link of the Eastern Kyūshū Motorway
1995	June	Saitobaru burial mounds selected to be part of a national large-scale project to preserve remains
1996	November 1	木喰上人造仏五体 appointed a prefectural cultural asset.
1998	October 1	Ceremony to celebrate the 40th anniversary of the foundation of the city.
1998	October 12	Maintenance of the Saitobaru Burial mounds and surrounding area selected as part of the Ministry of Home Affairs Reading Project.
2000	September 6	The ruins of Tonokori Castle were appointed as a National Historical place.
2004	April 25	55th National Tree Planting ceremony held in Saito city.
2006	November	20th Saitobaru Kofun Festival takes place.

Translated from the Saito Homepage

== Government ==
Saito has a mayor-council form of government with a directly elected mayor and a unicameral city council of 18 members. Saito and the village of Nishimera collectively contribute one member to the Miyazaki Prefectural Assembly. In terms of national politics, the city is part of the Miyazaki 2nd district of the lower house of the Diet of Japan.

== Economy ==
The city's economy is centered on agriculture. The agricultural products of Saito include green peppers, cucumbers and sweet corn.

== Education ==
Saito has eight public elementary schools, and six public junior high schools operated by the city government, and one five public high school operated by the Miyazaki Prefectural Board of Education.

== Transportation ==
=== Railways ===
Saito does not have any passenger railway service since the discontinuation of the JNR Tsuma Line on December 1, 1984. The nearest stations are Sadowara Station Hyūga-Shintomi Station, and Takanabe Station, all of which are on the JR Kyushu Nippō Main Line, and all of which are approximately 30 minutes by car from the city center.

=== Highways ===
- Higashikyushu Expressway
- National Route 219

== Local attractions ==
- Saitobaru Kofun Cluster, Special National Historic Site,comprising 311 burial mounds which lay on a plateau roughly 4 by 2 km in size, making it one of the largest collections of burial mounds in Japan. It was designated a Special Historic site by the Japanese government in 1952.
- Tonokōri Castle - A castle ruin, Home castle of Itō clan

=== Festivals and traditions ===
- Saito City Flower Festival, March 31 - April 8
- Kofun Matsuri, August 27–29

== Notable natives ==
- Toshiro Konishi, Japanese Peruvian chef, musician and television personality

== Sister cities ==
- Luodong, Yilan County, Taiwan
