= Zhengyue =

First month of the Chinese calendar

Zhēngyuè

Chinese name
- Chinese: 正月
- Hanyu Pinyin: Zhēngyuè
Transcriptions
Standard Mandarin
- Hanyu Pinyin: Zhēngyuè

Korean name
- Hangul: 정월
- Hanja: 正月
Transcriptions
- Revised Romanization: Jeongwol

Traditional Korean name
- Hangul: 호랑이달
- Hanja: 寅月
Transcriptions
- Revised Romanization: Horangidal

Japanese name
- Kanji: 一月
- Kana: いちがつ
Transcriptions
- Romanization: Ichigatsu

Traditional Japanese name
- Kanji: 睦月
- Kana: むつき
Transcriptions
- Romanization: Mutsuki

Zhēngyuè (Chinese: 正月) is the first month of the Chinese calendar and calendars based on it, such as the Japanese calendar, Korean calendar and Vietnamese calendar. It follows Làyuè and precedes Èryuè. It is known in Japanese as Ichigatsu (Japanese: 一月) or traditionally Mutsuki (Japanese: 睦月), and in Korean as Jeongwol (Korean: 정월; Hanja: 正月) or traditionally Horangidal (Korean: 호랑이달; Hanja: 寅月). All of these words can also refer to the month of January in the Gregorian calendar.

== Names ==
In Mandarin Chinese, traditional names of the month include yuányuè (Chinese: 元月), zōuyuè (Chinese: 陬月), and duānyuè (Chinese: 端月).

In Japanese, the month is known as ichigatsu (Japanese: 一月) or traditionally mutsuki (Japanese: 睦月). According to the 12th century poet Fujiwara no Kiyosuke, mutsuki is named after the friendly/affectionate (Japanese: 睦まじい, romanized: mutsumajī) gatherings of relatives at the beginning of the year. Alternatively, it may come from もとつ月, meaning the first or original month.

== Observances ==
- Chinese New Year begins on the 1st day of the 1st month, and lasts until the Lantern Festival on the 15th day.
- Tết is celebrated on the 1st day of the 1st month in Vietnam.
- The Shen Zhu festival is held on the 6th day of the 1st month in Taiwan.
- Jinjitsu was traditionally observed on the 7th day of the 1st month in Japan.
- Daeboreum is celebrated on the 15th day of the 1st month in Korea.
- Yabuiri (Japanese: 藪入り) was a festival traditionally observed on the 16th day of the 1st and 7th months, on which apprentices, servants and maidservants were given gifts and allowed to return to their parents' homes for the day.

== Births ==
- Wu Zetian, the only female emperor of China, Zhēngyuè 23, 624
- Li Bai, Chinese poet, Zhēngyuè 16, 701
- Emperor Shunzong of Tang, an emperor of the Chinese Tang dynasty, Zhēngyuè 12, 761
- Bai Juyi, a Chinese poet of the Tang dynasty, Zhēngyuè 20, 772
- Emperor Xizong of Jin, an emperor of the Jin dynasty which controlled northern China from 1115 to 1234, Zhēngyuè 17, 1119
- Qiu Chuji, a Daoist disciple of Wang Chongyang, Zhēngyuè 9, 1148
- Itō Suketaka, a samurai, daimyō and twelfth family leader of the Itō clan, Zhēngyuè 15, 1559
- Shunzhi Emperor, the third emperor of the Qing dynasty and the first Qing emperor to rule over China, from 1644 to 1661, Zhēngyuè 30, 1638
- Li Hongzhang, a politician, general, and diplomat of the late Qing Empire, Zhēngyuè 5, 1823
- Aisin-Gioro Puyi, the last emperor of China and the twelfth and final ruler of the Qing dynasty, Zhēngyuè 14, 1906

== Deaths ==
- Sun Jian, a military general and warlord who lived in the late Eastern Han dynasty, Zhēngyuè 7, 191
- Guan Yu, a general serving under the warlord Liu Bei in the late Eastern Han dynasty, Zhēngyuè 13, 220
- Cao Cao, a warlord and the penultimate chancellor of the Eastern Han dynasty who rose to great power in the final years of the dynasty, Zhēngyuè 23, 220
- Emperor Xianzong of Tang, an emperor of the Chinese Tang dynasty, Zhēngyuè 27, 820
- Emperor Yingzong of Song, the fifth emperor of the Song dynasty of China, Zhēngyuè 7, 1067
- Emperor Zhezong of Song, the seventh emperor of the Song dynasty of China, Zhēngyuè 12, 1100
- Kublai Khan, the fifth Khagan (Great Khan) of the Ikh Mongol Uls (Mongol Empire), reigning from 1260 to 1294, and the founder of the Yuan dynasty in Mongolia and China, Zhēngyuè 22, 1294
- Qianlong Emperor, the sixth emperor of the Manchu-led Qing dynasty, and the fourth Qing emperor to rule over China proper, Zhēngyuè 3, 1799
- Daoguang Emperor, a Qing emperor, Zhēngyuè 14, 1850

== Dates ==
Below is a list of the start and end dates of Zhēngyuè in the Gregorian calendar. Because the 1-hour difference between China and Japan/Korea occasionally affects the date on which a new moon occurs, the dates below can differ from those of the Japanese and Korean calendars.

Dates of Zhēngyuè
Year	First day	Last day
2016	8 February	8 March
2017	28 January	25 February
2018	16 February	16 March
2019	5 February	6 March
2020	25 January	22 February
2021	12 February	12 March
2022	1 February	2 March
2023	22 January	19 February
2024	10 February	9 March
2025	29 January	27 February
2026	17 February	18 March
2027	6 February	7 March
2028	26 January	24 February
2029	13 February	14 March
2030	3 February	3 March
2031	23 January	20 February
2032	11 February	11 March
2033	31 January	28 February
2034	19 February	19 March
2035	8 February	9 March
2036	28 January	26 February
