= Okada Domain =

Administrative division in western Japan during the Edo period (1617-1871)

Okada Domain 岡田藩
- Domain of Japan
- 1615–1871
- Mon of the Itō clan
- Capital: Okada jin'ya
- Area
  - Coordinates: 34°38′44.11″N 133°42′18.63″E
- Historical era: Edo period
  - Established: 1615
  - Abolition of the han system: 1871
- Contained within
  - Province: Bitchū Province
- Today part of: Okayama Prefecture

Location of Okada jin'ya
Okada Domain (Japan)

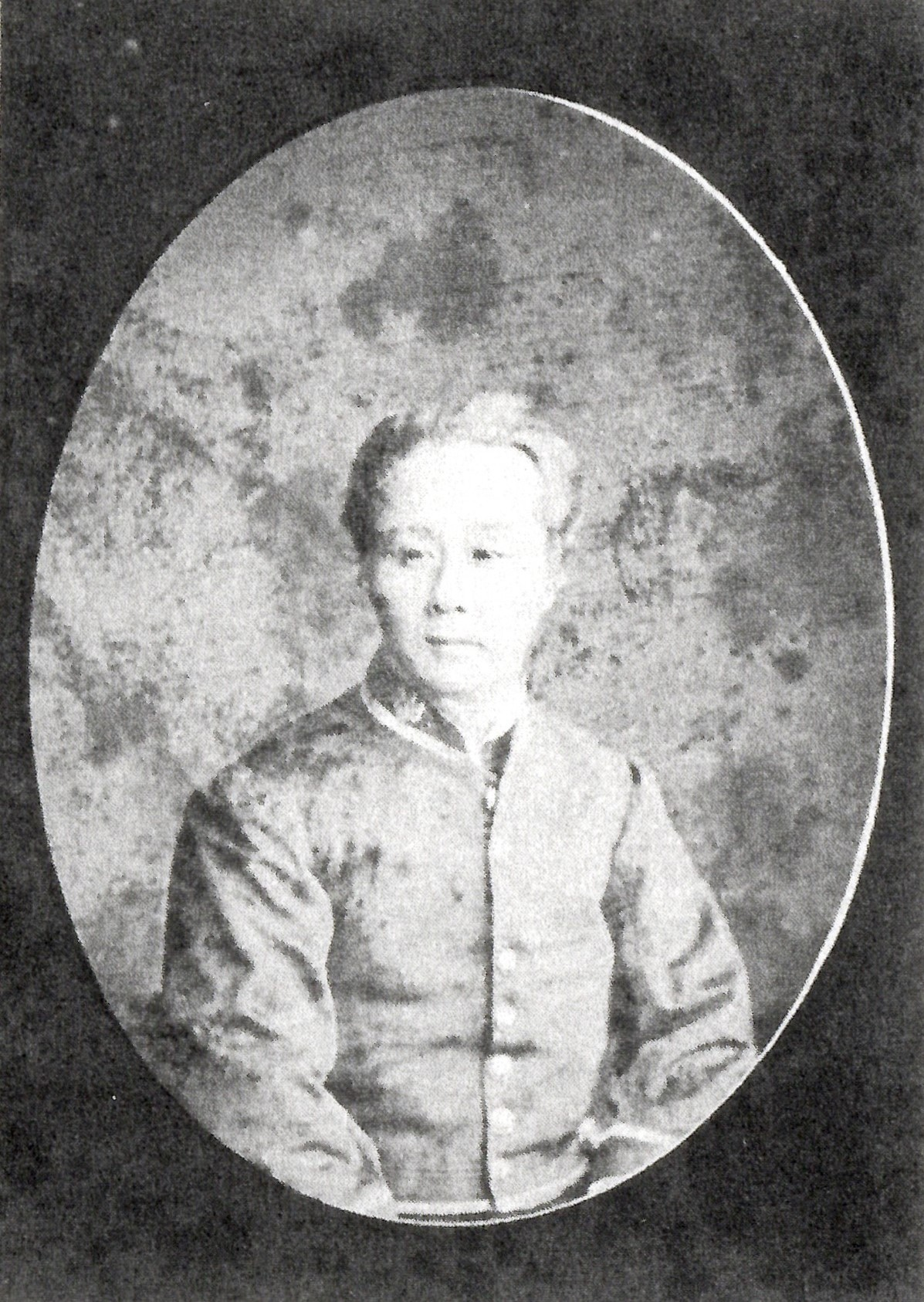
Itō Nagatoshi

Okada Domain (岡田藩, Okada-han) was a feudal domain under the Tokugawa shogunate of Edo period Japan, in what is now western Okayama Prefecture. It controlled a small portion of central Bitchū Province and was centered around Okada jin'ya in what is now the Mabi neighborhood of the city of Kurashiki, Okayama. It was ruled throughout its history by a branch of the Itō clan. The location of the jin'ya changed several times, and the domain as also known as Kawabe Domain (川辺藩) after one of these locations where it was sited in the Genroku period (1688-1704). It was dissolved in the abolition of the han system in 1871 and is now part of Okayama Prefecture.

== History ==
Itō Nagazane, the founder of the domain, who was a descendant of Itō Sukechika, a late Heian period warlord from Izu Province. He served Toyotomi Hideyoshi and Toyotomi Hideyori, and remained a loyal vassal of the Toyotomi clan until the Siege of Osaka. However, before the 1600 Battle of Sekigahara, he is said to have reported to Tokugawa Ieyasu that Ishida Mitsunari had raised an army against him, and for this reason Ieyasu pardoned Itō Nagazane and his son after the fall of Osaka and end of the Toyotomi. In 1615, he was awarded 10,343 koku scattered across several provinces. He constructed a jin'ya in southern Bitchū Province, and became a daimyō. His descendants ruled the domain until the abolition of the han system in 1871.

A notable event in the history of the domain was the Shinpon Gimin Sōdō (新本義民騒動) of 1718. During the tenure of the 5th daimyō, Itō Nagahiro, the domain "nationalized" Mount Ohira and Mount Haruyama in what is now part of Sōja. Historically, local villagers had been permitted to gather lumber for building and firewood on these mountains, but the domain forbid entry and attempted to make a monopoly on wood. Four village headmen travelled to Edo to make a direct appeal to the daimyō. As a result, the monopoly was cancelled and the villagers had their traditional rights restored. However, as was the custom of the time, the four headmen were executed for lèse-majesté, their property forfeited, and their families expelled from the domain. A large monument now commemorates the event.

Okada Domain became Okada Prefecture, and was incorporated into Okayama Prefecture via Fukatsu Prefecture and Oda Prefecture. The Itō clan was later granted the title of viscount under the kazoku peerage system.

== Holdings at the end of the Edo period ==
As with most domains in the han system, Okada Domain consisted of several discontinuous territories calculated to provide the assigned kokudaka, based on periodic cadastral surveys and projected agricultural yields, g.

- Bitchū Province
  - 16 villages in Katō District
- Mimasaka Province
  - 1 village in Ikeda District
- Kawachi Province
  - 2 villages in Takayasu District
- Settsu Province
  - 1 village in Toyoshima District

== List of daimyō ==
#	Name	Tenure	Courtesy title	Court Rank	kokudaka
Itō clan, 1615-1871 (Tozama)
1	Itō Nagazane (伊東長実)	1615 - 1629	Tango-no-kami (丹後守)	Junior 5th Rank, Lower Grade (従五位下)	10,343 koku
2	Itō Nagamasa (伊東長昌)	1629 - 1640	Wakasa-no-kami (若狭守)	Junior 5th Rank, Lower Grade (従五位下)	10,343 koku
3	Itō Nagaharu (伊東長治)	1640 - 1658	-unknown-	Junior 5th Rank, Lower Grade (従五位下)	10,343 koku
4	Itō Nagasada (伊東長貞)	1658 - 1693	Shinano-no-kami (信濃守)	Junior 5th Rank, Lower Grade (従五位下)	10,343 koku
5	Itō Nagahira (伊東長救)	1693 - 1723	Harima-no-kami (播磨守)	Junior 5th Rank, Lower Grade (従五位下)	10,343 koku
6	Itō Nagaoka (伊東長丘)	1723 - 1763	Izu-no-kami (伊豆守)	Junior 5th Rank, Lower Grade (従五位下)	10,343 koku
7	Itō Nagatoshi (伊東長詮)	1763 - 1778	Izu-no-kami (伊豆守)	Junior 5th Rank, Lower Grade (従五位下)	10,343 koku
8	Itō Nagatomo (伊東長寛)	1778 - 1850	Harima-no-kami (播磨守)	Junior 5th Rank, Lower Grade (従五位下)	10,343 koku
9	Itō Nagayasu (伊東長裕)	1850 - 1860	Wakasa-no-kami (若狭守)	Junior 5th Rank, Lower Grade (従五位下)	10,343 koku
10	Itō Nagatoshi (伊東長とし)	1860 - 1871	Harima-no-kami (播磨守)	Junior 5th Rank, Lower Grade (従五位下)	10,343 koku

== See also ==
- List of Han
- Abolition of the han system
