= Obi Domain =

Administrative division in Japan during the Edo period (1601–1871)

Obi Domain 飫肥藩
- Domain of Japan
- 1617–1871
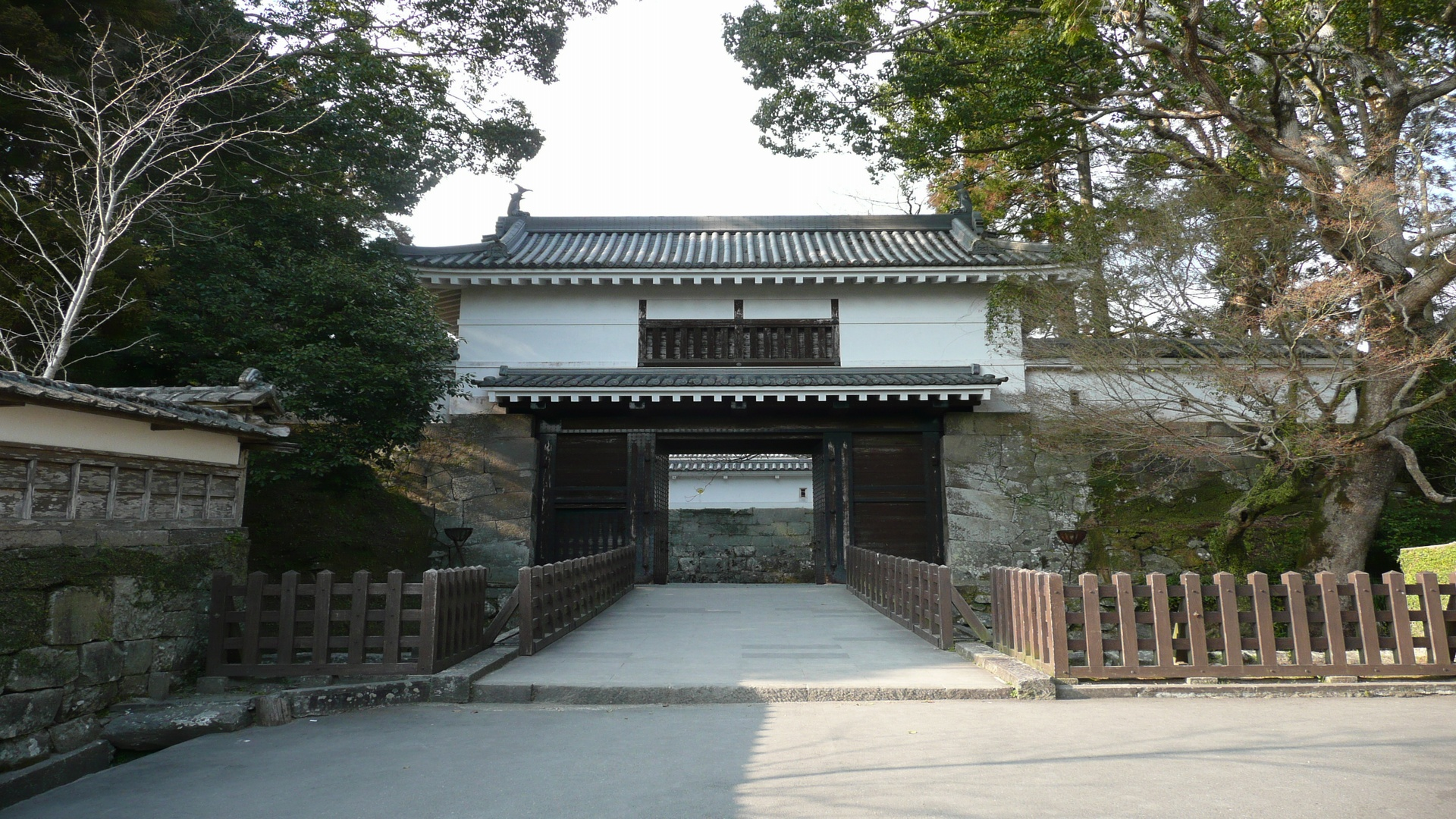
- Obi Castle Otemon

- Mon of the Ito clan
- Capital: Obi Castle
- Area
  - Coordinates: 31°37′44.78″N 131°21′1.09″E
- Historical era: Edo period
  - Established: 1617
  - Abolition of the han system: 1871
- Contained within
  - Province: Hyuga Province
- Today part of: Miyazaki Prefecture

Location of Obi Castle
Obi Domain (Japan)

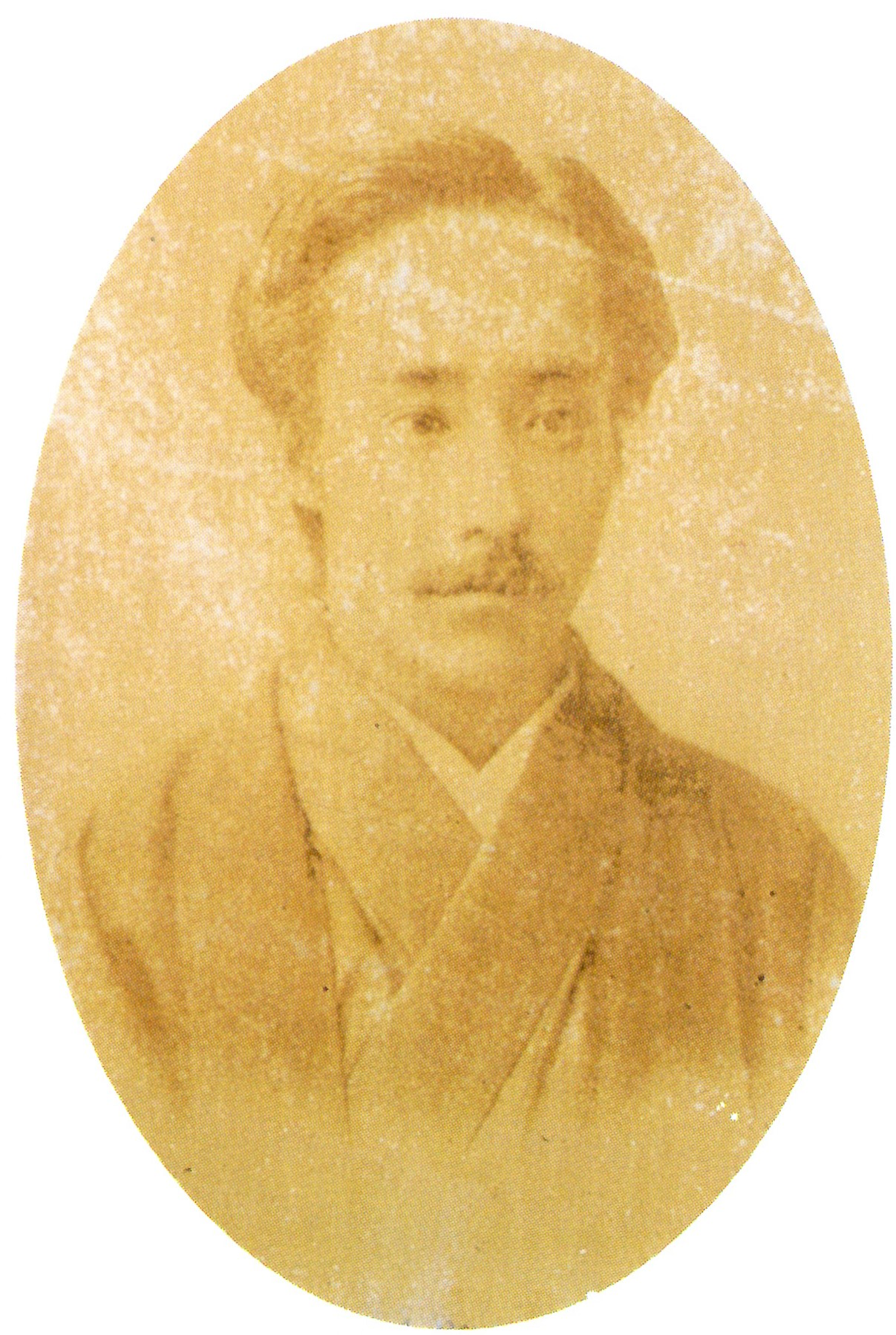
Ito Sukeyori, final daimyō of Obi Domain

Obi Domain (飫肥藩, Obi-han) was a feudal domain under the Tokugawa shogunate of Edo period Japan, in what is now central Miyazaki Prefecture. It was centered around Obi Castle in what is now Nichinan, Miyazaki and was ruled by the tozama daimyō Itō clan for all of its history.

== History ==
In the late Heian period, following the assassination of Kudō Suketsune as described in the Soga Monogatari, his descendants were scattered in various locations in Japan. One cadet branch of the clan were appointed jitō of Hyūga Province by the Kamakura shogunate and eventually came to control vast estates. The Itō clan assisted Ashikaga Takauji in his battles of the early Nanboku-chō period and were assigned management of the estates held in the name of Takauji's wife in Hyūga. The clan was in a constant struggle with the aggressive Shimazu clan to the south, and at one point in the Sengoku period was forced to flee Hyūga when the Shimazu conquered the province. The 12th hereditary chieftain of the clan, Itō Suketaka, after many hardships, became a vassal of Toyotomi Hideyoshi and distinguished himself during many of Hideyoshi's campaigns. He also assisted Hideyoshi in his conquest of Kyūshū and was restored to the former Itō holdings. During the 1600 Battle of Sekigahara, he remained at Osaka Castle due to illness, while secretly communicating with Tokugawa Ieyasu and ordering his son, Itō Sukeyaka to conquer Miyazaki Castle on Ieyasu's behalf. For these reasons, he was confirmed as daimyō of Obi Domain with his existing 57,000 koku territory. His descendants would continue to rule Obi over 14 generations until the Meiji restoration.

The third daimyō, Sukehisa, distributed 3,000 koku to his younger brother, Suketoyo in 1636, and the fourth daimyō, Sukemichi, distributed 3,000 koku to his younger brother, Sukeharu, in 1657. After that, the kokudaka of the domain remained at 51,000 koku. The territory had little arable land and was surrounded by mountains, forests and beaches. In the 1600s, the domain began cultivating Japanese cedar cuttings developing forestry as a major scope of income. Even today, Obi cedar is thriving as a specialty of this area. At the same time, fishing also played a role in the domain's finances.

The 11th daimyō, Suketami, established a han school in 1801, which was renamed Shintokudo in 1830. During the Bakumatsu period, the domain was in financial difficulties, and in 1851 the retainers' stipends were reduced to one-third, and in 1857 a thrift ordinance was issued. The 13th daimyō, Suketomo, endeavored to promote industrial development, reform the military system, build artillery forts for coastal defense, encourage sericulture, reform the transportation industry, and achieved many successes. The domain allied with Satsuma Domain in the Boshin War and served as the defender of Nijō Castle and Kōfu Castle. During his tenure the han school produced many talented people who would later serve in the Meiji government, including Komura Jutarō, who became Minister of Foreign Affairs and who signed the Portsmouth Treaty ending the Russo-Japanese War.

In 1871, due to the abolition of the han system, the domain became Obi Prefecture, and subsequently part of "Miyakonojō Prefecture", "Miyazaki Prefecture", and Kagoshima Prefecture, and was incorporated into the re-established Miyazaki Prefecture. The Ito clan was elevated to the kazoku peerage with the title of viscount in 1884.

== Holdings at the end of the Edo period ==
As with most domains in the han system, Obi Domain consisted of several discontinuous territories calculated to provide the assigned kokudaka, based on periodic cadastral surveys and projected agricultural yields, g.

- Hyūga Province
  - 36 villages in Naka District
  - 4 villages in Miyazaki District
  - In addition, 2 villages in Miyazaki, 7 villages in Kitanaka and 5 villages in Minaminaka Districts which were tenryō territory were entrusted to Obi.

== List of daimyō ==
#	Name	Tenure	Courtesy title	Court Rank	kokudaka
Itō clan, 1617–1871 (Tozama)
1	Itō Suketaka (伊東祐兵)	1587–1600	Bungo-no-kami (豊後守)	Junior 5th Rank, Lower Grade (従五位下)	57,000 koku
2	Itō Sukenori (伊東祐慶)	1600–1636	Shuri-no-kami (修理大夫)	Junior 5th Rank, Lower Grade (従五位下)	57,000 koku
3	Itō Sukehisa (伊東祐久)	1636–1657	Yamato-no-kami (大和守)	Junior 5th Rank, Lower Grade (従五位下)	57,000 --> 54,000 koku
4	Itō Sukemichi (伊東祐由)	1657–1661	Sakyō-no-suke (左京亮)	Junior 5th Rank, Lower Grade (従五位下)	54,000 --> 51,000 koku
5	Itō Sukezane (伊東祐実)	1661–1714	Yamato-no-kami (大和守)	Junior 5th Rank, Lower Grade (従五位下)	51,000 koku
6	Itō Sukenaga (伊東祐永)	1714–1739	Shuri-no-suke (修理亮)	Junior 5th Rank, Lower Grade (従五位下)	51,000 koku
7	Itō Sukeyuki (伊東祐之)	1739–1744	Yamato-no-kami (大和守)	Junior 5th Rank, Lower Grade (従五位下)	51,000 koku
8	Itō Suketaka (伊東祐隆)	1744–1757	Shuri-no-kami (修理大夫)	Junior 5th Rank, Lower Grade (従五位下)	51,000 koku
9	Itō Sukeyoshi (伊東祐福)	1757–1781	Yamato-no-kami (大和守)	Junior 5th Rank, Lower Grade (従五位下)	51,000 koku
10	Itō Sukeatsu (伊東祐鐘)	1781–1798	Sakyō-no-suke (修理亮)	Junior 5th Rank, Lower Grade (従五位下)	51,000 koku
11	Itō Suketami (伊東祐民)	1798–1812	Shuri-no-kami (修理大夫)	Junior 5th Rank, Lower Grade (従五位下)	51,000 koku
12	Itō Sukehiro (伊東祐丕)	1812–1814	Shuri-no-kami (修理大夫)	Junior 5th Rank, Lower Grade (従五位下)	51,000 koku
13	Itō Suketomo (伊東祐相)	1814–1869	Sakyō-no-daibu (右京大夫)	Junior 5th Rank, Lower Grade (従五位下)	51,000 koku
14	Itō Sukeyori (伊東祐帰)	1869–1871	Shuri-no-kami (修理大夫)	Upper 4th Rank (正四位)	51,000 koku

== See also ==
- List of Han
- Abolition of the han system
