= Itō Suketaka =

Itō Suketaka 伊東 祐兵
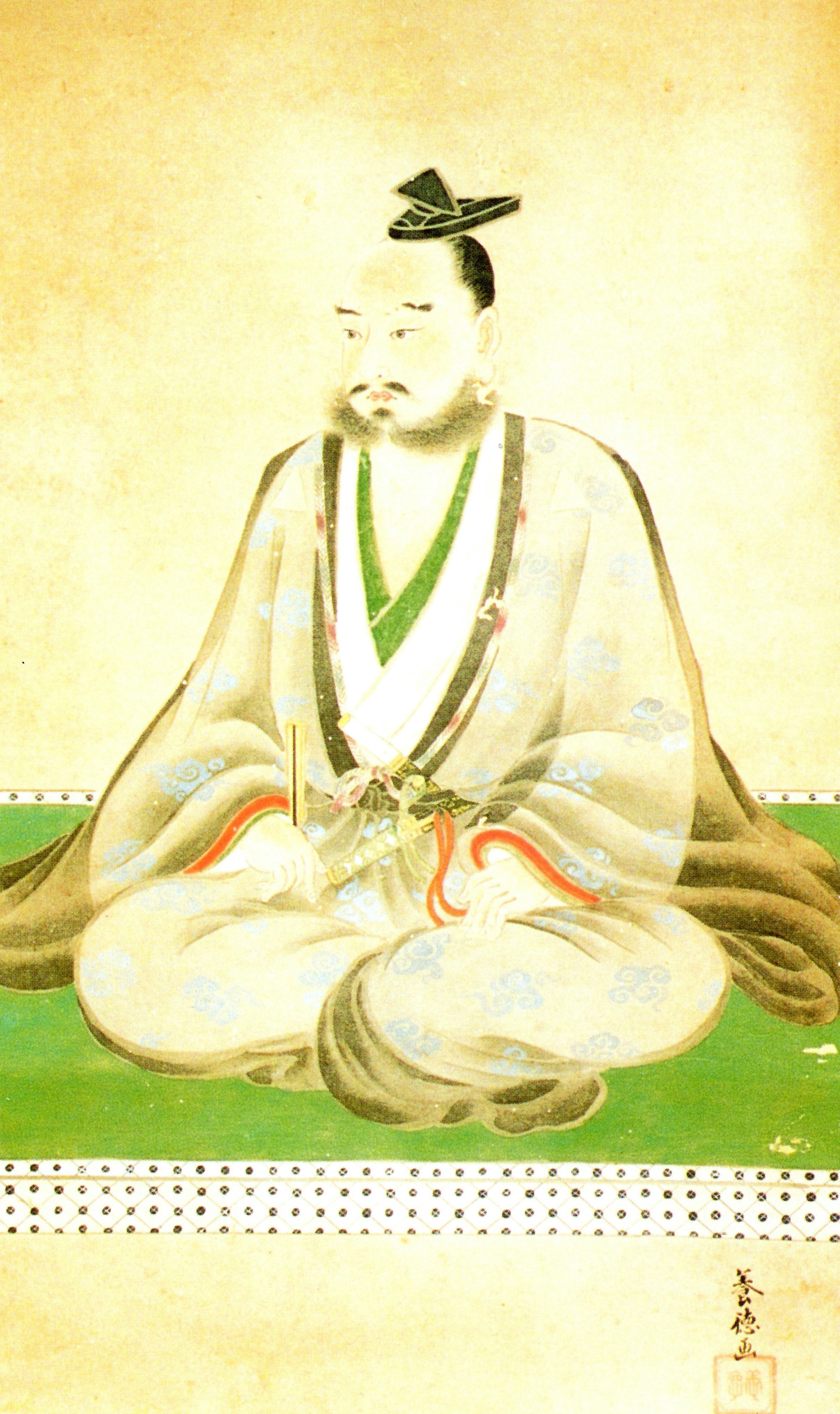
- Born: Eiroku 2, January 15 (Zhēngyuè) (1559 February 22); Hyuga Province, Japan
- Died: Keichō 5, October 11 (Zhēngyuè) (1600 November 16)
- Burial place: Hōonji-temple, Nichinan city, Miyazaki Prefecture
- Spouse: Seishitsu : Itō Yoshimasu's daughter
- Children: daughter (Itō Sukehira's Seishitsu), Itō Sukeyoshi, Osen (Naruse Masatake's Seishitsu), daughter (Takigawa Norinao's Seishitsu), Itō Sukekoto
- Relatives: Father : Itō Yoshisuke; Mother : Kawazaki's daughter Adoptive father: Itō Yoshimasu
- Military career
- Era: Sengoku period – Azuchi–Momoyama period
- Rank: Mimbu-taifu, Junior Fifth Rank, Lower Grade, Bungo-no-kami

Itō Suketaka (伊東 祐兵) was a samurai, daimyō and twelfth family leader of the Itō clan, which was active from the Sengoku period to the Azuchi–Momoyama period. Today, Suketaka is regarded as the "ruler of virtue of the middle-Itō clan".

== Biography ==
Suketaka was Itō Yoshisuke's third son.

=== Early Conflicts ===
In the year Eiroku 11 (1568), Suketaka entered Obi castle and conquered the Shimazu clan. In the year Tenshō 5 (1577), Yoshisuke's vassals, in particular Fukunaga Suketomo and Mera Norishige, betrayed Suketaka. The Shimazu clan used this opportunity to invade the Itō clan. As a result, Suketaka and his father were forced to flee. They walked from Mera mountain to Takachiho, where they asked Otomo Sōrin for protection.

Sōrin agreed to this request, as his ambition was to "[make] Hyuga province a Christian land." Sōrin invaded Hyūga Province and fought against the Shimazu clan, but his army was defeated in the Battle of Mimigawa at the Mimi river. Sōrin lost most of his vassals and Suketaka and Yoshisuke felt shamed. Sōrin moved to Iyo Province and asked the Kōno clan for help with their 20 retainers, without Yoshikatsu and Yoshikata. However, they fell into poverty and Kawazaki Sukenaaga, one of his vassals, ran a sake brewery to earn money.

=== Restoration of the Ito Clan ===
At that time, Sanpō, a member of the Yamabushi, was asked by Kawazaki Sukenaga to pray for the revival of the Itō clan. He met Itō Kamon-no-suke (Itō Nagazane, one of the Yellow Horo Military Commanders) in Himeji, Harima Province. Suketaka was introduced to the Oda clan and became Hashiba Hideyoshi's vassal by Nagazane whose ancestor he shared with Suketaka. After the Honnō-ji incident, Suketaka became the immediate vassal of Hideyoshi. In the year Tenshō 10 (1582), at the Battle of Yamazaki, Suketaka played an active part and was bestowed the Kurikara spear and 500 Koku territory in the Kawachi Province as a reward. In the year Tenshō 15 (1587), Suketaka successfully planned the Kyushu conquest. For this achievement, Suketaka was given 28,000 Koku in Kiyotake and Miyazaki city. Finally, Suketaka succeeded in reviving the Itō clan, with himself as daimyo. In the following year, Suketaka's territory was added to the 36,000 Koku and he regained his home of Nichinan city. Suketaka then joined the Japanese invasions of Korea.

In the year Keichō 4 (1599), Suketaka bestowed the original surname "Toyotomi".

In Keichō 5 (1600), in the Battle of Sekigahara, Suketaka was at Osaka Castle. However, because Suketaka was very ill, he did not join the battle. He sent his son Itō Sukeyoshi to his home and ordered him to prepare for battle. Furthermore, Suketaka communicated secretly to Tokugawa Ieyasu via Kuroda Kanbei. In Suketaka's home, his vassal Inazu Shigemasa commanded the Itō army and conquered Miyazaki castle (Akizuki Mototane's castle). Mototane betrayed the West army and communicated with the East army. Due to this situation, the Itō clan was forced to return that castle after the battle, but Ieyasu recognized Suketaka's achievement and promised not to take the territory of the Itō clan.

=== Death ===
In 1600, Suketaka died in Osaka due to an unknown illness.

== Legacy ==
Suketaka's son survived as lord of the Obi domain during the Edo period. The present leader of the Itō clan is Itō Sukeaki (伊東 祐昭).
