= Sadowara Domain =

Administrative division in Japan during the Edo period (1601–1871)

Sadowara Domain 佐土原藩
- Domain of Japan
- 1603–1871
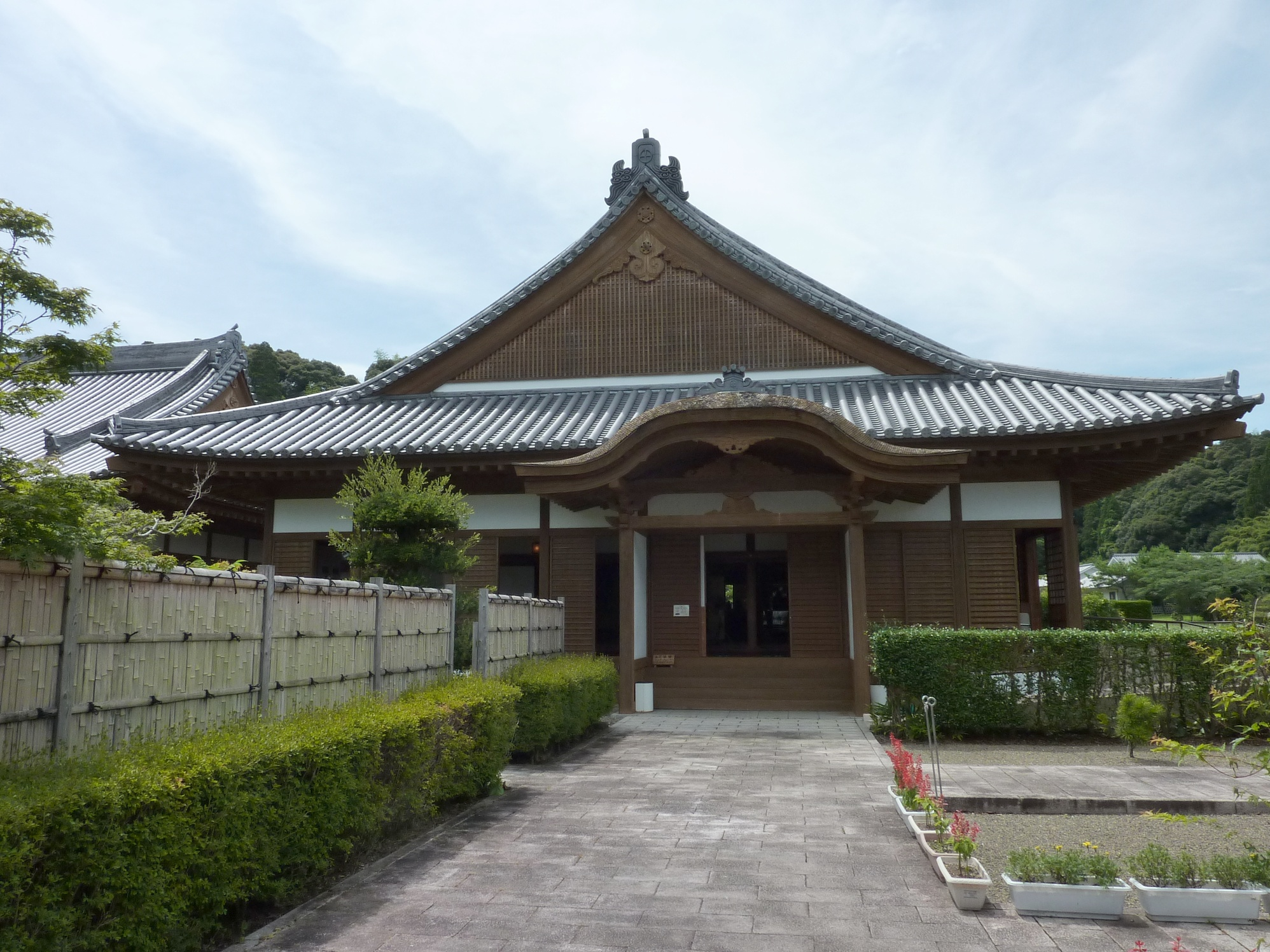
- Sadowara Castle

- Mon of the Shimazu clan
- Capital: Sadowara Castle
- Area
  - Coordinates: 32°02′52.2″N 131°25′25.8″E
- Historical era: Edo period
  - Established: 1603
  - Abolition of the han system: 1871
- Contained within
  - Province: Hyūga Province
- Today part of: Miyazaki Prefecture

Location of Sadowara Castle
Sadowara Domain (Japan)

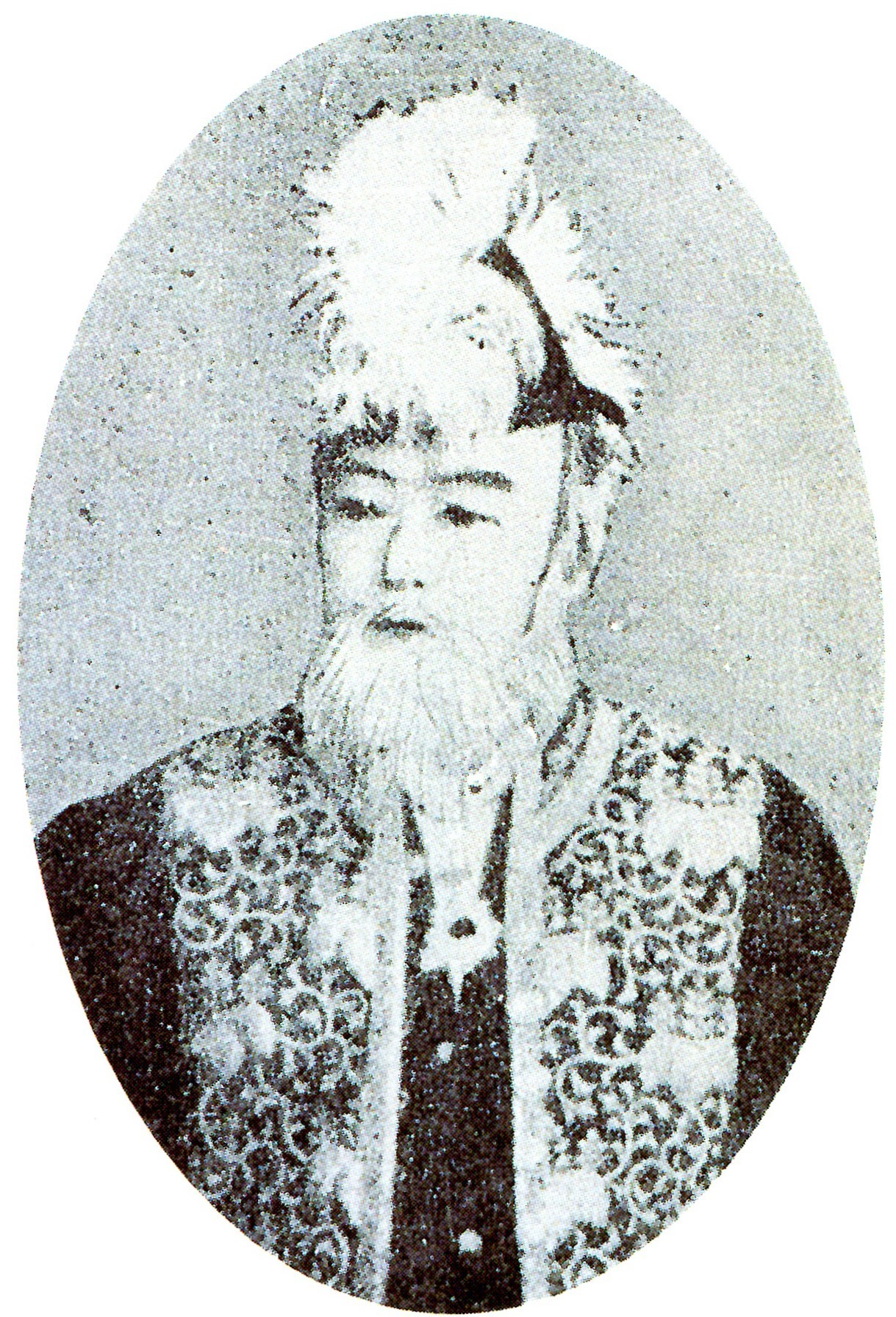
Shimazu Tadahiro, final daimyō of Sadowara Domain

Sadowara Domain (佐土原藩, Sadowara-han) was a feudal domain under the Tokugawa shogunate of Edo period Japan, in what is now central Miyazaki Prefecture. It was centered around Sadowara Castle in what is now the city of Miyazaki and was ruled by a cadet branch of the tozama daimyō Shimazu clan for all of its history.

== History ==
In 1603, Shimazu Mochihisa, the son of Shimazu Takahisa's younger brother, Shimazu Tadamasa, was given 30,000 koku in Naka District and Koyu District, Hyuga Province, and allowed to establish a cadet branch of the Shimazu clan based at Sadowara Castle. This land was originally the territory of Shimazu Iehisa and Shimazu Toyohisa, but after Toyohisa died at the Battle of Sekigahara in 1600, the territory was seized by the Tokugawa shogunate. The aim of the shogunate in establishing Sadowara as a domain was not only to ensure the succession of the Shimazu clan, but to favor the Tarumi faction within the clan as a potential rival to the main clan in Kagoshima.

The relationship with Satsuma Domain is similar to that between Sendai Domain and Uwajima Domain, or Morioka Domain and Hachinohe Domain. While there is a view that Sadowara is not a subsidiary domain of Satsuma Domain, it was subject to repeated interference from Satsuma Domain in its internal affairs. The Sadowara daimyō was from the Tarumi Shimazu clan, who were regarded as retainers, rather than relatives, of the ruling Satsuma clan. On the other hand, the Satsuma clan had to officially recognize that the Tarumi-Shimazu ruling Satowara were not in fact their retainers, but were recognized by the shogunate as co-equal daimyō. Many of the legal wives of the generations of Sadowara daimyō were from Satsuma, including not only the princesses of the head of the Shimazu clan but also the daughters of Satsuma Domain chief retainers. On the other hand, until the end of the Edo period, no son of the Satsuma daimyō was adopted by the Sadowara daimyō as his successor.

The 6th daimyō, Korehisa became daimyō as an infant, so Tadataka's cousin Hisatoshi was adopted as daimyō until Tadahisa came of age. Within the domain, this resulted in an O-Ie Sōdō, which in turn led to the intervention of Satsuma Domain in 1686 (Matsunoki Riot). In 1690, Korehisa had finally come of age, but according to the wishes of the shogunate, the kokudaka of the domain was reduced to 27,000 koku. On the other hand, the domain was granted the prestige of being a "castle-holding domain" in 1699.

On June 7, 1839 (April 7, 1839), the 10th daimyō, Shimazu Tadatetsu, died suddenly at the Kusatsu-juku honjin (in present-day Kusatsu, Shiga) en route to Edo to fulfill his sankin-kōtai obligation. As he had not yet appointed a successor, there was a strong possibility that the domain would face attainder, so his vassals kept the death a secret until permission was granted for the succession to be passed to his third son, Shimazu Tadahiro. On the following day, Tadatetsu's death was officially announced.

In the Bakumatsu period, Shimazu Tadahiro worked closely with Satsuma Domin, and in 1869, he was awarded 30,000 koku for his efforts in the fierce battles of the Boshin War. He also promoted moving the seat of the domain from Sadowara Castle to Hirose Castle. However, with the abolition of the han system in 1871, construction of Hirose Castle was discontinued, and Sadowara Domain became "Sadowara Prefecture". Tadahiro subsequently relocated to Tokyo, and Sadowara Prefecture was abolished and incorporated into Mimitsu Prefecture. Later, Mimitsu Prefecture was incorporated into Miyazaki Prefecture, merged with Kagoshima Prefecture, and then re-incorporated into the reconstituted Miyazaki Prefecture. The Sadowara Shimazu clan was ennobled with the kazoku peerage title of viscount in 1884. In 1891, Shimazu Tadahiro was elevated to Count. Shimazu Hisanaga, the spouse of Emperor Shōwa's daughter Takako, was his descendant.

=== Yuba-gumi ===
Sadowara Domain had an unusual social structure created by the second daimyō, Shimazu Tadaoki. Originally it was intended to foster martial arts and to strength the domain's samurai against attacks from Obi Domain or even Satsuma Domain, it was organized into groups based on young men between the ages of 15 and 30, with associate members are between the ages of 30 and 59, each responsible for one of the four inner and five outer gates of Sadowara Castle. Each group practiced archery and horsemanship in addition to swordsmanship. However, what began as groups to strength martial arts and defenses evolved into rival political discussion groups, which were further divided by differences in the social standing of its membership. Rivalries between these groups also inflamed various riots and disturbances within the domain. It was largely in an effort to escape from the pervasive influence of these political cliques that Sadowara Domain took the unusual step of attempting to change its seat to a new castle at Hirose Castle even after the start of the Meiji period.

== Holdings at the end of the Edo period ==
As with most domains in the han system, Sadowara Domain consisted of several discontinuous territories calculated to provide the assigned kokudaka, based on periodic cadastral surveys and projected agricultural yields, g.

- Hyūga Province
  - 11 villages in Naka District
  - 15 villages in Koyu District

== List of daimyō ==
#	Name	Tenure	Courtesy title	Court Rank	kokudaka
Shimazu clan, 1603–1871 (Tozama daimyo)
1	Shimazu Mochihisa (島津以久)	1603–1610	Uma-no-kami (右馬頭)	Junior 5th Rank, Lower Grade (従五位下)	30,000 koku
2	Shimazu Tadaoki (島津忠興)	1610–1637	Uma-no-kami (右馬頭)	Junior 5th Rank, Lower Grade (従五位下)	30,000 koku
3	Shimazu Hisataka (島津久雄)	1637–1663	Uma-no-kami (飛騨守)	Junior 5th Rank, Lower Grade (従五位下)	30,000 koku
4	Shimazu Tadataka (島津忠高)	1663–1676	Hida-no-kami (右馬頭)	Junior 5th Rank, Lower Grade (従五位下)	30,000 koku
5	Shimazu Hisatoshi (島津久寿)	1676–1690	Shikibu-no-sho (式部少輔)	Junior 5th Rank, Lower Grade (従五位下)	30,000 -->27,000 koku
6	Shimazu Korehisa (島津惟久)	1690–1723	Shikibu-no-kami (備後守)	Junior 5th Rank, Lower Grade (従五位下)	27,000 koku
7	Shimazu Tamamasa (島津忠雅)	1723–1753	Awaji-no-kami (淡路守)	Junior 5th Rank, Lower Grade (従五位下)	27,000 koku
8	Shimazu Hisamoto (島津久柄)	1753–1785	Kaga-no-kami (加賀守)	Junior 5th Rank, Lower Grade (従五位下)	27,000 koku
9	Shimazu Tadamochi (島津忠持)	1785–1816	Awaji-no-kami (淡路守)	Junior 5th Rank, Lower Grade (従五位下)	27,000 koku
10	Shimazu Tadayuki (島津忠徹)	1816–1839	Awaji-no-kami (淡路守)	Junior 5th Rank, Lower Grade (従五位下)	27,000 koku
11	Shimazu Tadahiro (島津忠寛)	1839–1871	Awaji-no-kami (淡路守)	Junior 5th Rank, Lower Grade (従五位下)	27,000 koku

== See also ==
- List of Han
- Abolition of the han system
