= Hyūga Kokubun-ji =

Buddhist temple in Saito, Miyazaki, Japan

Hyūga Kokubun-ji ruins
- 日向国分寺 (Japanese)
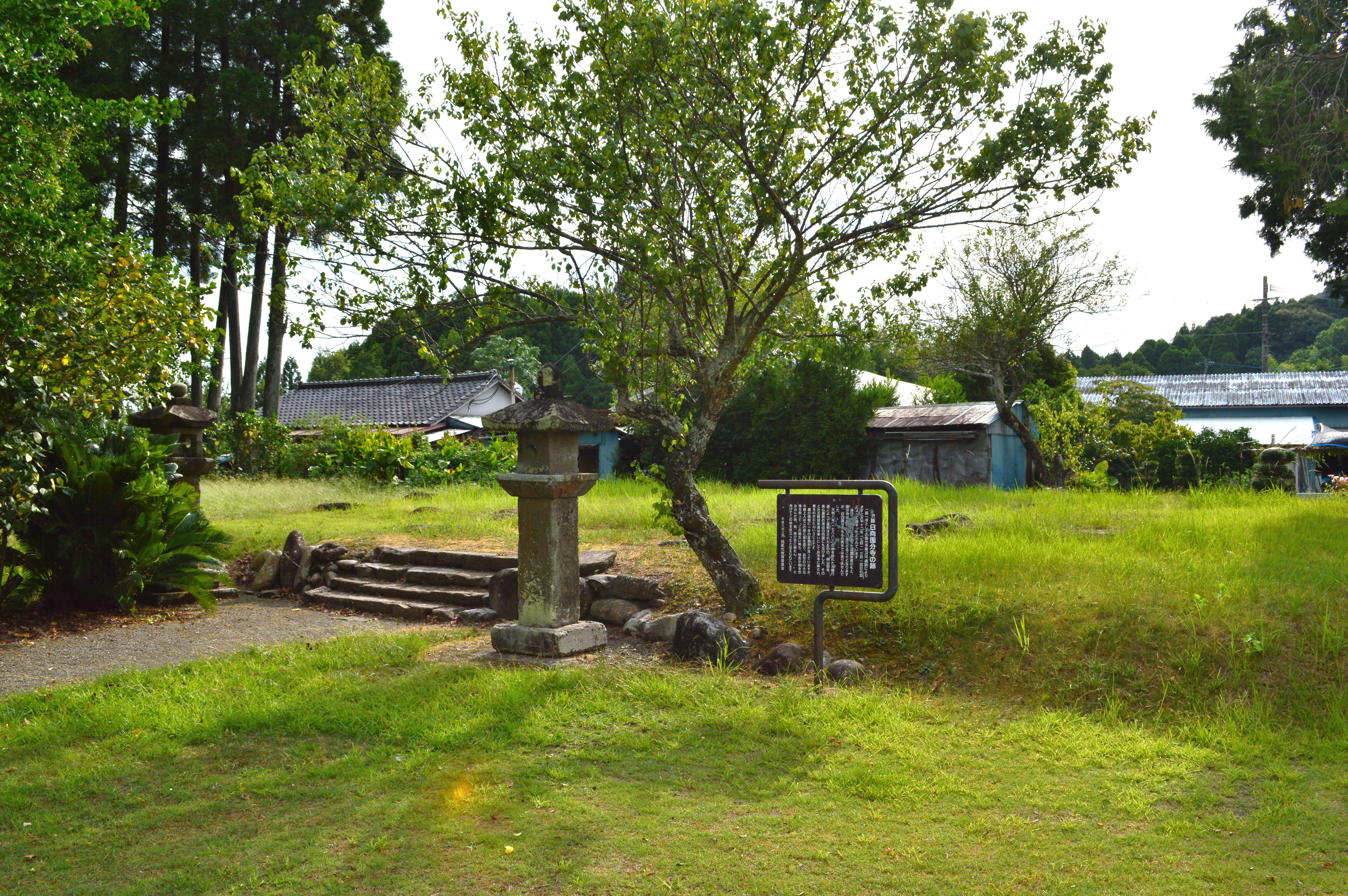
- Hyūga Kokubun-ji ruins

- Kōjindani Site Hyūga Kokubun-ji (Japan)
- Interactive map of Hyūga Kokubun-ji ruins
- 32°06′08.70″N 131°23′48.87″E
- Periods: Nara period
- Location: Saito, Miyazaki, Japan
- Region: Kyushu

Site notes
- Public access: Yes, park

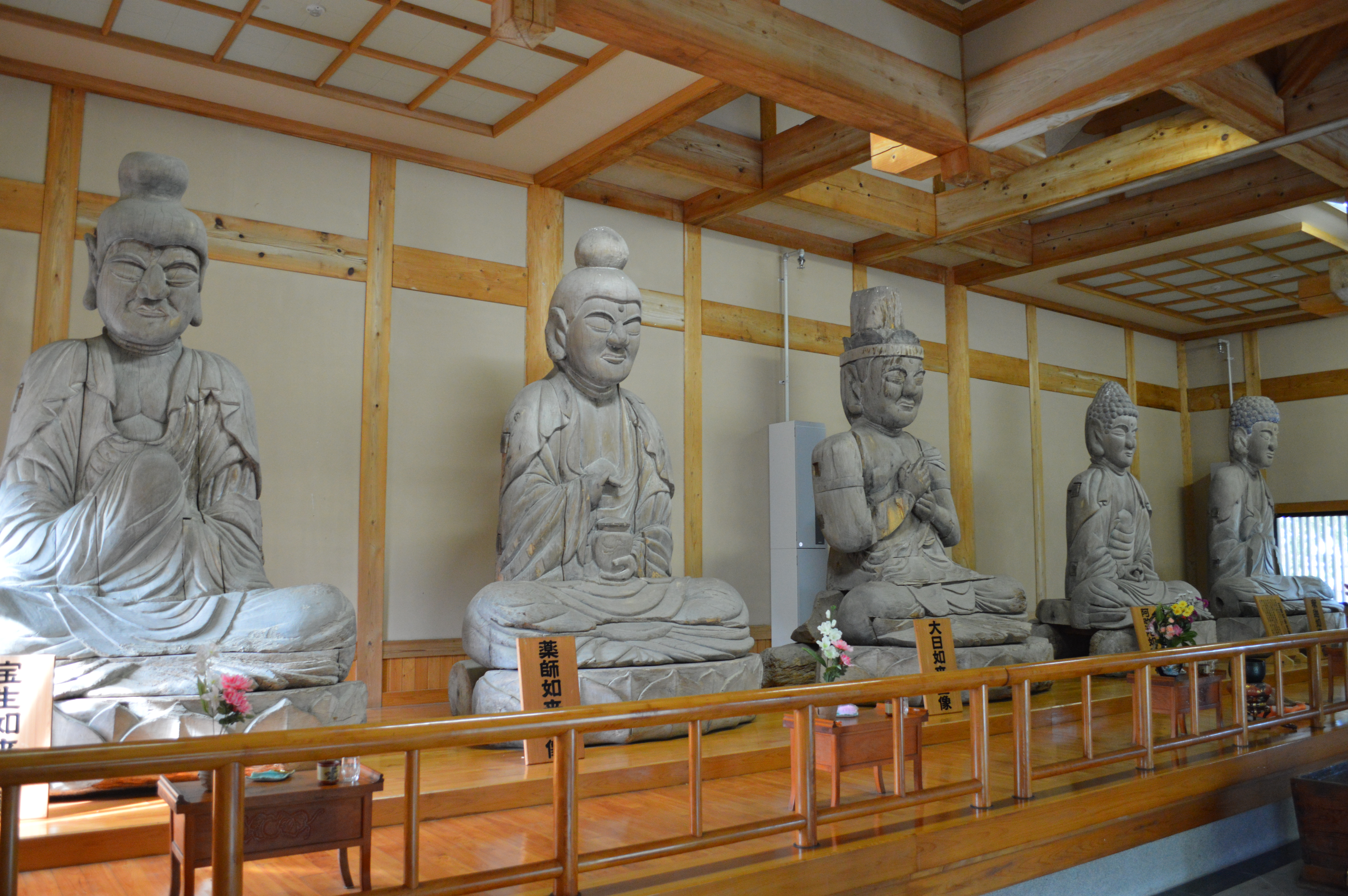
Hyūga Kokubun-ji Five Tathāgatas

Hyūga Kokubun-ji (日向国分寺) was a Buddhist temple in the Mitake neighborhood of the city of Saito, Miyazaki, Japan. It was one of the provincial temples established by Emperor Shōmu during the Nara period (710 – 794). The temple was abandoned in 1871, but previous to this had belonged to the Shingon sect. Its ruins were designated as a National Historic Site in 1957.

== History ==
The Shoku Nihongi records that in 741, as the country recovered from a major smallpox epidemic, Emperor Shōmu ordered that a monastery and nunnery be established in every province: the kokubunji (国分寺). These temples were built to a semi-standardized template, and served both to spread Buddhist orthodoxy to the provinces, and to emphasize the power of the Nara period centralized government under the Ritsuryō system.

The Hyūga Kokubun-ji is located on a plateau on the right bank of the Hitotsuse River, which flows east toward the Hyūga Sea. This is the southern part of the Saitobaru Plateau, 2.6 kilometers south of the Saitobaru Kofun Cluster. In the surrounding area, there are probable sites of the Hyūga provincial capital ruins and the Hyuga Kokubun-niji nunnery ruins where a large amount of roof tiles were excavated, and the name of the location is "Kokubu". It is unclear when Hyūga Kokubun-ji was built, as no records remain. In the entry dated December 20, 756, in the Shoku Nihongi, 26 provincial temples, including Hyūga, are listed, so the temple must have been constructed between 741, when the imperial edict was issued, and the year 756.

Archaeological excavations were carried out by the Hyuga Archaeological Survey Team in 1948, and by the Miyazaki Prefectural Board of Education in 1961 and 1989, and Saito City Board of Education in 1995. As a result of these excavations, portions of the foundations of what are believed to be the Main Hall, Lecture Hall, Middle gate, West gate, and the remains of a corridor were confirmed. Although the north and east sides of the temple area are not clearly defined, reconstruction suggests that the temple area was approximately 150 meters east-to-west and approximately 190 meters north-to-south. It has also been revealed that there is a group of buildings with dug pillars related to the temple on the east side. Haji ware pottery and pottery with ink inscriptions were also unearthed, and based on the analysis of the excavated roof tiles, it is believed that the temple was built in the latter half of the 8th century and fell into decline at the end of the 9th century.

In 1788, the wandering monk and sculptor Mokujiki (1718-1810), who was on a nationwide pilgrimage, visited the Hyūga Kokubun-ji. At the time of his visit, the temple was in decline, and he was asked by the locals to become its chief priest. In 1791, the Main Hall was destroyed by fire, so Mokujiki worked hard to rebuild it, erecting a temple and creating a carved the set of Five Tathāgatas statues which became the temple's new honzon. He left this temple in 1797. The temple fell into decline again, and in 1871, during the anti-Buddhist Haibutsu kishaku movement of the early Meiji period, the temple was demolished. However, the statues of the statue of the Five Tathāgatas were protected by local believers, and a chapel was later rebuilt, but soon after World War II it collapsed due to a typhoon. It was rebuilt again, but was demolished when a facility (Mokuhiki Gochi-kan) was built to enshrine the Five Tathāgatas statues. The statues are now a Miyazaki Prefectural Tangible Cultural Property.

The site is located approximately 15 kilometers west of Takanabe Station on the JR Kyushu Nippo Main Line.

== Hyūga Kokubun-niji ==
The site of the nunnery associated with the Hyūga Kokubun-niji is estimated to be approximately 600 meters north of the Hyūga Kokubun-ji, on the grounds of the current Miyazaki Prefectural Tsuma High School. Many roof tiles have been excavated from this area that appear to have been manufactured at the same time as those excavated from the Hyūga Kokufu and Hyūga Kokubun-ji. The archaeological excavation only detected a ditch, and the structure of the temple is still unclear. This site is outside the current National Historic Site designation.

== See also ==
- List of Historic Sites of Japan (Miyazaki)
- provincial temple
