= Hyūga Province =

Former province of Japan

Hyūga Province 日向国
- pre-Meiji period Japan
- 7th century–1871
- Map of Japanese provinces (1868) showing the location of Hyūga Province (red) in the Saikaidō (green)
- Capital: Saito
- History
  - Established: 7th century
  - Satsuma Province separates from Hyūga: 702
  - Ōsumi Province separates from Hyūga: 713
  - Disestablished: 1871
- Today part of: Miyazaki Prefecture

Hyūga Province (日向国, Hyūga no Kuni; Japanese pronunciation: [çj̊ɨ́ɨ̀.ɡä̀ (nò̞ kɯ̈̀.ɲ̟ì), -ŋä̀ (nò̞ kɯ̈̀.ɲ̟ì)]) was a province of Japan in the area of southeastern Kyushu, corresponding to modern Miyazaki Prefecture Hyūga bordered on Ōsumi to the south, Higo to the west, and Bungo to the north. Its abbreviated form name was Kōshū (向州), although it was also called Nisshū (日州). In terms of the Gokishichidō system, Hyūga was one of the provinces of the Saikaidō circuit. Under the Engishiki classification system, Hyūga was ranked as one of the "middle countries" (中国) in terms of importance, and one of the "far countries" (遠国) in terms of distance from the capital.

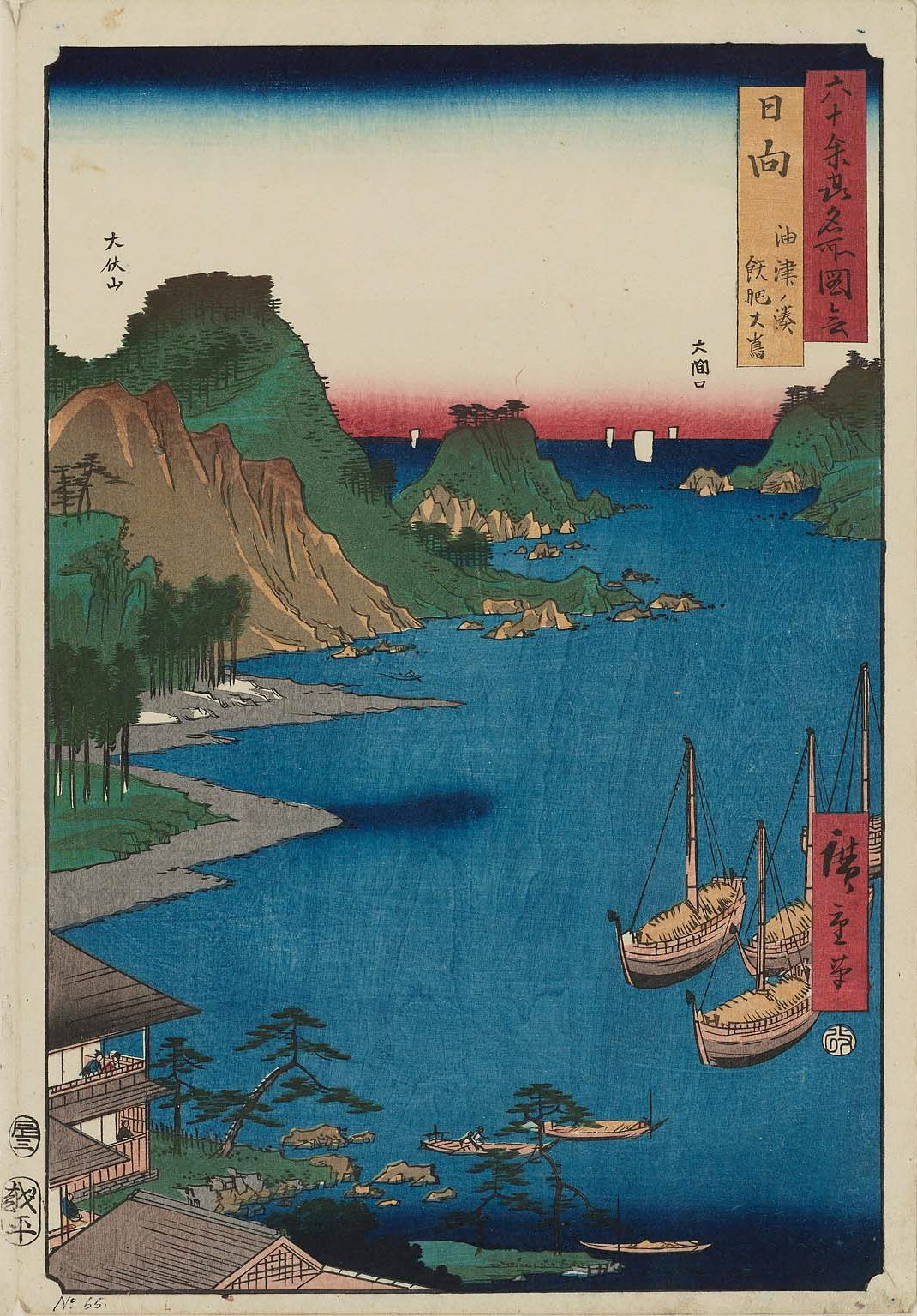
Hiroshige ukiyo-e "Hyūga" in "The Famous Scenes of the Sixty States" (六十余州名所図会), depicting Aburatsu Port and Obi Oshima in 1856

== History ==
=== Early history ===
Ruins from the Japanese Paleolithic period have been discovered in the Hyūga area, and red-colored pottery made from cinnabar has been excavated from the Tsukahara ruins from the Jōmon period. The Hyūga region of the Yayoi period is characterized by the lack of bronze tools and the presence of gouged square stone knives, while imported ironware from the central Kyushu region have been unearthed. Many stories about Hyūga during this period appear in the Kojiki and Nihon Shoki, particularly in the early "Age of the Gods" period in which the descendants of the kami, including Amaterasu, Amenohoakari, Hikohohodemi, Hoderi and others, descended on the peak of Takachiho, bringing to the primitive inhabitants the secrets of rice cultivation, metals working and advanced fishing and agricultural technologies, which later spread from this area to the Kinai region.

It is also noteworthy that Emperor Jimmu departed from Hyūga on his expedition to conquer what later became Yamato although ancient texts and mythology remain vague as to whether or not he was originally the ruler of Hyūga. During the Kofun period, influences of culture from the Asian continent became stronger and from the 4th century, burial mounds similar to those found in the Kinai region began to appear in the area, including the Saitobaru Kofun Cluster. In the Kojiki and the Nihon Shoki, Hyūga is called the "land of the Kumaso" (熊曽国) of Tsukushi-no-shima (Kyushu), which is named along with the provinces of Tsukushi, Toyo and Hi. The Kumaso people were subjugated either by Yamato Takeru or his father Emperor Keikō. Also according to the Nihon Shoki, Emperor Keiko's son, Prince Toyokuni was appointed Hyūga Kuni no miyatsuko in the reign of Emperor Ojin.

The existence of kofun clusters indicates that there was a political relationship between the local rulers and the Yamato Kingdom before the Asuka period. However, even into the Nara period the exact status of the area vis-a-vis Yamato remains unclear. In the time of Emperor Suiko, horses from Hyūga were famous with the court. The name "Hyūga Province" appears in an article dated September 28, 698, in the second year of Emperor Monmu's reign in the Shoku Nihongi, but it is unclear when this country was established, and with the establishment of the Ritsuryō system from the end of the 7th century, Hyūga initially included what later became Satsuma Province and Ōsumi Province. In 702, Satsuma was separated from Hyūga, followed by Ōsumi in 713. However, the local Hayato tribes of the area rebelled four times between the end of the 7th century and the early 8th century, which indicates that rule by Yamato was tenuous during this period. This cumulated in the Hayato rebellion of 720–721. The Hyūga-no-kuni Fudoki was compiled in the first half of the 8th century by Fujiwara no Umakai, who may have visited the area in person.

The provincial capital during the Nara and Heian period was located in Koyu District, but the exact location is uncertain. It is presumed to be the Terasaki ruins, in what is now the city of Saito, but this identification is uncertain. The kokubun-ji of the province was the Hyūga Kokubun-ji, which was also located in Saito. The ichinomiya of the province is the Tsuno Shrine, located in Tsuno, Miyazaki, and the sōja of the province is the Tsuma Shrine, located in Miyazaki city. Per the Engishiki records of the mid-Heian period, only four shrines are listed, all of which were classified as "minor".

In 1185, Tadahisa Koremune, possibly an illegitimate son of Minamoto no Yoritomo was appointed to the position of jitō of Shimazu-shō (a large shōen estate located in southern Kyushu) belonging to the Konoe family. He took the name of "Shimazu" and his clan would rule southern Kyushu for the next 800 years. In 1197, Tadahisa was appointed as the shugo of Hyūga, along with Satsuma and Ōsumi. However, in 1203, Tadahisa was reduced to only Satsuma Province, and Hyūga was passed on to the Hōjō clan; although Usa Hachiman-gu controlled the entire northern area of Hyūga. In the Nanboku-chō period, the area had devolved into numerous semi-independent feudal estates with constantly shifting loyalties between the Northern Court and the Southern Court, with Hyūga as a battleground between the Ōtomo clan from Bungo in the north, the Shimazu clan in the south, and the Itō clan ruling from Obi in the center. However, in 1587, following Hideyoshi's conquest of Kyūshū, the Shimazu clan surrendered, and Hyūga Province was divided among the feudal lords who had distinguished themselves under Hideyoshi.

=== Edo Period and early modern period ===
Unlike many of the provinces of Kyushu, Hyūga was not dominated by a single daimyō; rather, it was divided into tenryō territory directly governed by the Tokugawa shogunate and a few small domains. In addition, Satsuma Domain and Hitoyoshi Domain had many scattered holdings, especially in the southern and western parts of the province.

Bakumatsu period domains
| Name | Clan | Type | kokudaka |
|---|---|---|---|
| Nobeoka | Naitō | Fudai | 70,000 koku |
| Takanabe | Akizuki | Tozama | 27,000 koku |
| Sadowara | Shimazu | Tozama | 27,000 koku |
| Obi | Itō | Fudai | 51,000 koku |

Following the Meiji restoration, each of the feudal domains briefly became prefectures. In December 1871, the area roughly north of the Ōyodo River became Mimisu Prefecture, and areas to the south became Miyakonojō Prefecture. On January 15, 1873, the two prefectures were merged to form Miyazaki Prefecture. However, Miyazaki Prefecture was merged with Kagoshima Prefecture on August 21, 1876, but was reconstituted as Miyazaki Prefecture again on May 9, 1883, excluding some border areas which remained with Kagoshima. Per the early Meiji period Kyudaka kyuryo Torishirabe-chō (旧高旧領取調帳), an official government assessment of the nation's resources, the province had 377 villages with a total kokudaka of 417,393 koku. Hyūga Province consisted of:

Districts of Hyūga Province
| District | kokudaka | villages | Controlled by | Comments |
|---|---|---|---|---|
| Usuki (臼杵郡) | 42,290 koku | 73 villages | Tenryō, Hitoyoshi, Nobeoka, Takanabe | later divided into Higashiusuki and Nishiusuki |
| Naka (那珂郡) | 107,494 koku | 80 villages | Tenryō, Obi, Sadowara, Takanabe | later divided into Kitanaka and Minaminaka |
| Koyu (児湯郡) | 59,552 koku | 52 villages | Tenryō, Sadowara, Takanabe | |
| Miyazaki (宮崎郡) | 39,982 koku | 31 villages | Tenryō, Nobeoka, Obi | absorbed Kitanaka District on April 1, 1896; now dissolved |
| Morokata (諸県郡) | 168,073 koku | 41 villages | Tenryō, Takanabe, Satsuma | later divided into Higashimorokata, Kitamorokata and Nishimorokata, all of which were absorbed into Miyazaki District on May 9, 1883, and Minamimorokata, which was transferred to Kagoshima Prefecture on May 9, 1883 |

== Gallery ==
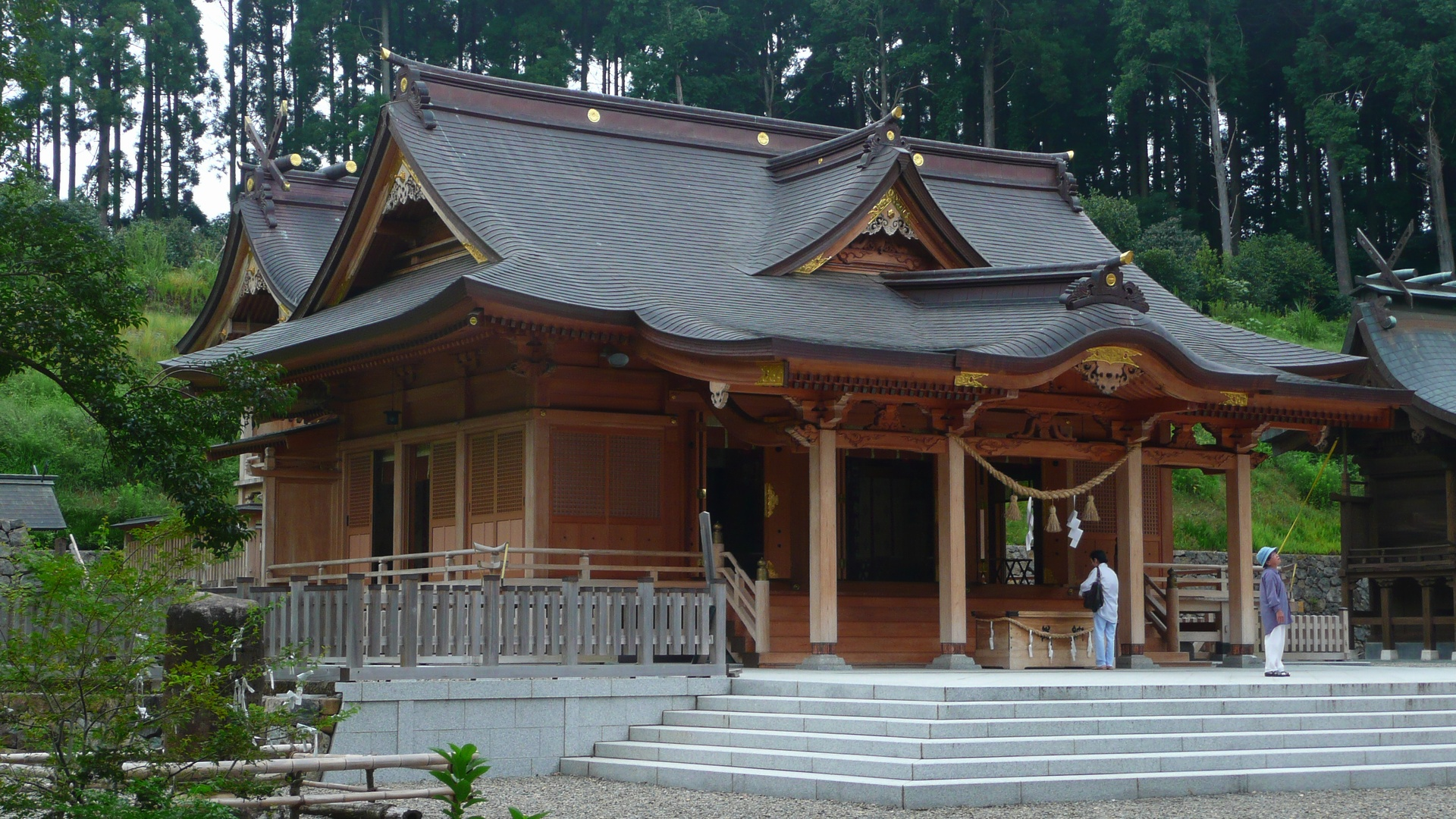
Tsuno Jinja, ichinomiya of the province

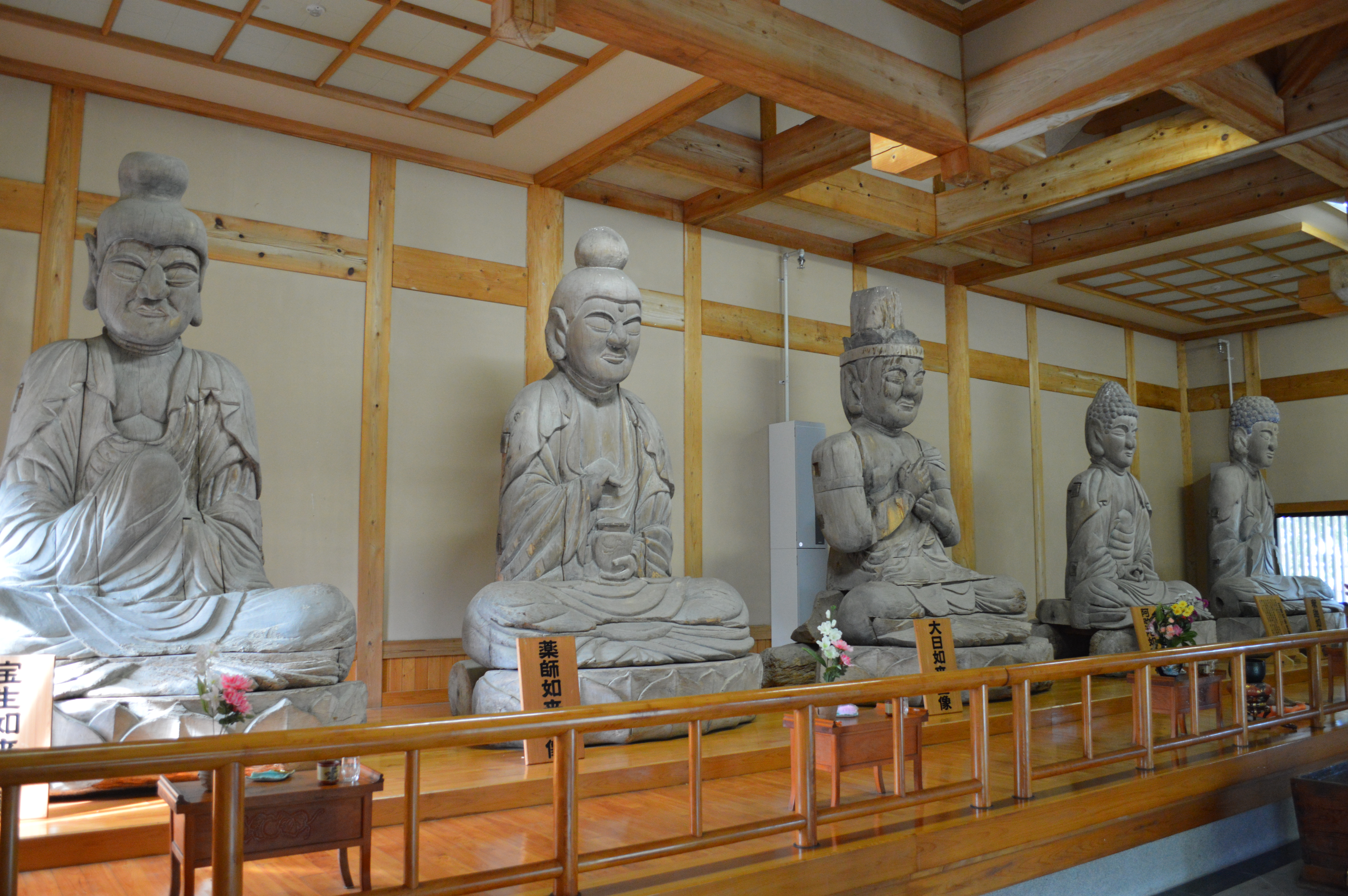
Surviving statues from Hyūga Kokubun-ji

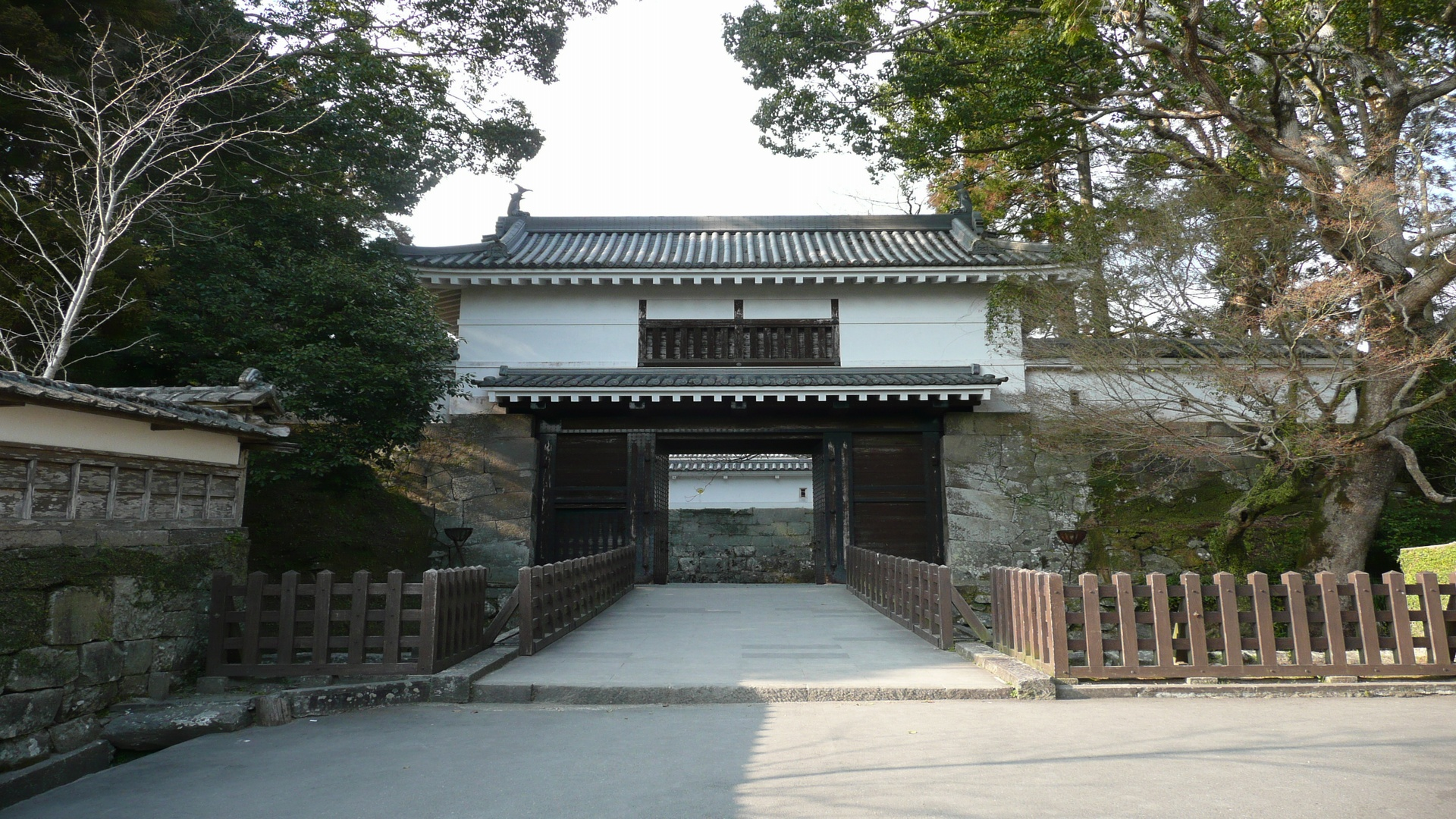
Obi Castle

== See also ==
- IJN Hyūga, 1918–1945
- JDS Hyūga, 2009–present
