= Itō clan =

Japanese clan

Itō 伊東
- The emblem (mon) of the Itō clan
- Home province: Izu; Hyūga; Kawachi; Bitchū; Hizen
- Parent house: Nanke・Kudō clan
- Titles: Lord of Obi; Viscount
- Dissolution: still extant
- Ruled until: 1868 (Abolition of the han system)
- Cadet branches: Okada Itō

The Itō clan (Japanese: 伊東氏, Hepburn: Itō-shi) are a Japanese clan of gōzoku that claimed descent from the Fujiwara clan through Fujiwara Korekimi (727–789) and Kudō Ietsugu.

Itō Suketoki (the son of Kudō Suketsune), was famous for his involvement in the incident involving the Soga brothers. The family became a moderate power both in influence and ability by the latter Sengoku period of Feudal Japan.

== History ==
After the death of Sukeie in 1181, Sukechika inherited the Kawazu Manor in Izu Province. When his uncle Suketsugu neared death, he made Sukechika the guardian of his son Suketsune, who became the head of the Itō Manor in Izu.

In the Muromachi period and the Sengoku period,

- Yoshisuke, who was the descendant of Suketsune, inherited Agata Domain in Hyūga Province in 1584
- Suketaka (1541–1600), who was the son of Yoshisuke, supported Toyotomi Hideyoshi after the death of Oda Nobunaga; and he was granted land in Kawachi Province. After the Kyushu Campaign in 1587, the lands were merged into Hyuga Province and Obi Domain (50,000 koku)
- Sukeyoshi (1588–1636), who was the son of Suketaka, fought at the Battle of Sekigahara. His descendants remaining at Obi until the Meiji Restoration.
- A cadet branch of the clan were heads of Okada Domain (10,000 koku) in Bitchū Province from 1615 until 1868

The Itō family's most serious rivals in this period were the Shimazu. The Shimazu clan, which had unified Satsuma Province and Ōsumi Province under their control, began to clash with the Itō in 1570. The Itō were finally defeated by the Shimazu in 1578. Yoshisuke, the family head, went to Kyoto by way of Iyo Province, and sought help from Toyotomi Hideyoshi. The family's old lands were restored in 1587, following Toyotomi Hideyoshi's invasion of Kyushu and defeat of the Shimazu clan. By the Edo period, the Itō retained their holdings, which came to be known as the Obi Domain.

Count Itō Sukeyuki, the Meiji era admiral, was a descendant of this family.

== See also ==
- Kōriyama Castle
