= Ōmuta =

Ōmuta 大牟田市
- City
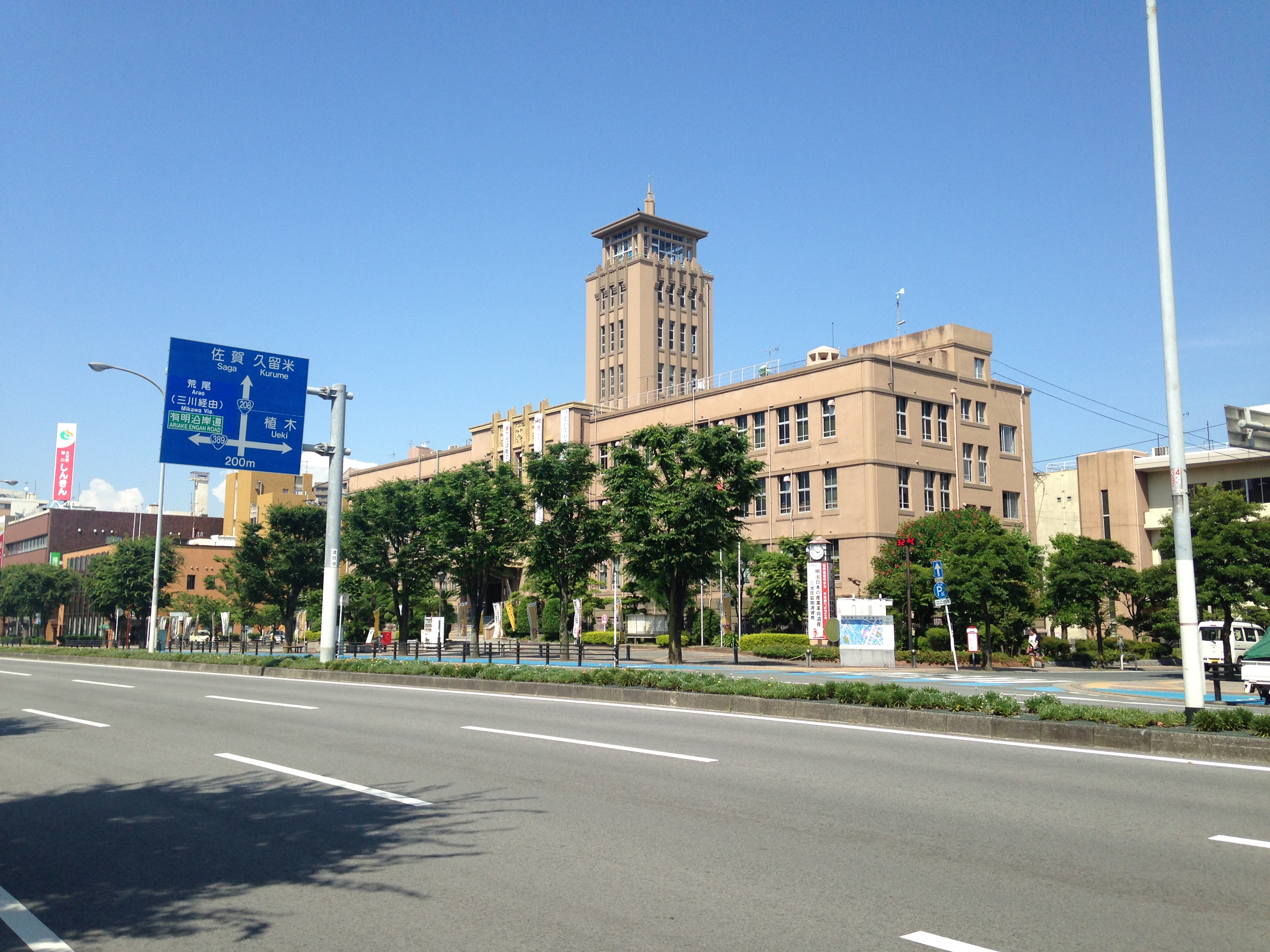
- Ōmuta City Hall

- Flag Seal
- Location of Ōmuta in Fukuoka Prefecture

- Location in Japan
- Coordinates: 33°1′49″N 130°26′45″E
- Country: Japan
- Region: Kyushu
- Prefecture: Fukuoka

Government
  - Mayor: Michio Koga

Area
  - Total: 81.45 km^{2} (31.45 sq mi)

Population (February 1, 2024)
  - Total: 106,393
  - Density: 1,306/km^{2} (3,383/sq mi)
- Time zone: UTC+09:00 (JST)
- City hall address: 2-3 Ariake-cho, Ōmuta-shi, Fukuoka-ken 836-8666
- Climate: Cfa
- Website: Official website
- Symbols
- Flower: Camellia
- Tree: Sawtooth Oak

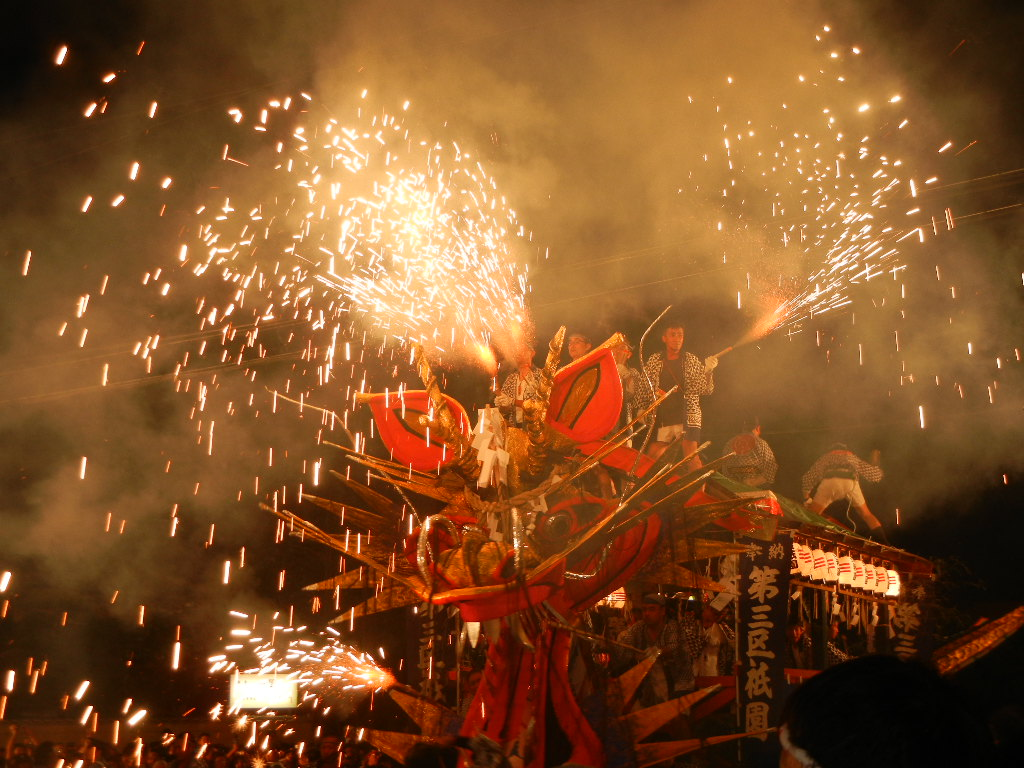
Daijayama Festival

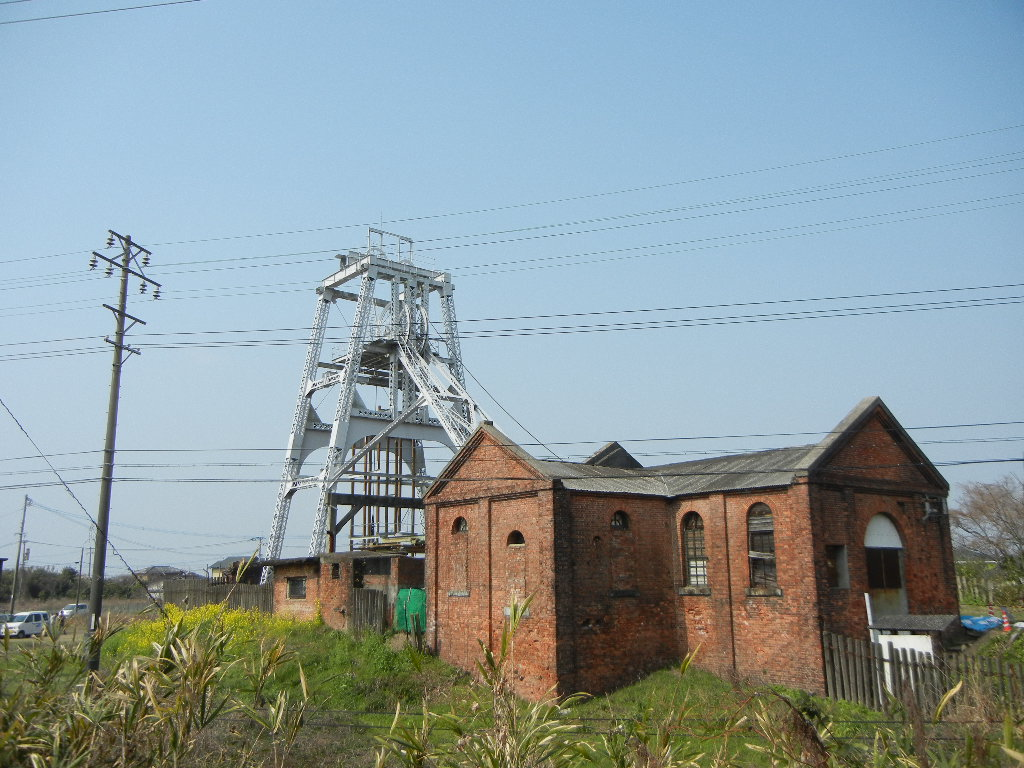
Former Mitsui Miike coal mine

Ōmuta (大牟田市, Ōmuta-shi; Japanese pronunciation: [ò̞ó̞.mɯ̈́.tä́(.ɕì), ó̞ó̞-]) is a city in Fukuoka Prefecture on the island of Kyushu, Japan. As of December 31, 2023, the city had an estimated population of 106,393 in 55,373 households, and a population density of 1,300 persons per km^{2}. The total area of the city is 81.45 km^{2} (31.45 sq mi).

== Geography ==
Ōmuta is located at the southernmost tip of Fukuoka Prefecture, and borders Kumamoto Prefecture to the south and east. It is located approximately 65 kilometers south of Fukuoka City, approximately 45 kilometers northwest of Kumamoto City, and approximately 35 kilometers southeast of Saga City. Reclaimed lands are spread out in the western part of the city facing the Ariake Sea. Furthermore, it faces the Shimabara Peninsula across the Ariake Sea, and on clear days it is possible to see Mount Unzen. There are three enclaves of Arao City within Ōmuta all of which were provided land by the Miike Domain during the Edo period in return for irrigation water from Higo Domain.

=== Neighboring municipalities ===
Fukuoka Prefecture

- Miyama

Kumamoto Prefecture

- Arao
- Nankan

=== Climate ===
Ōmuta has a humid subtropical climate (Köppen Cfa) characterized by warm summers and cool winters with light to no snowfall. The average annual temperature in Ōmuta is 16.6 °C (61.9 °F). The average annual rainfall is 1,932 mm (76.06 in) with September as the wettest month. The temperatures are highest on average in August, at around 27.1 °C (80.8 °F), and lowest in January, at around 6.4 °C (43.5 °F).

Climate data for Ōmuta (1991−2020 normals, extremes 1977−present)
| Month | Jan | Feb | Mar | Apr | May | Jun | Jul | Aug | Sep | Oct | Nov | Dec | Year |
|---|---|---|---|---|---|---|---|---|---|---|---|---|---|
| Record high °C (°F) | 20.5 (68.9) | 22.2 (72.0) | 25.0 (77.0) | 29.6 (85.3) | 32.9 (91.2) | 35.0 (95.0) | 37.3 (99.1) | 39.0 (102.2) | 37.0 (98.6) | 32.7 (90.9) | 27.6 (81.7) | 23.6 (74.5) | 39.0 (102.2) |
| Mean daily maximum °C (°F) | 10.0 (50.0) | 11.5 (52.7) | 15.0 (59.0) | 20.3 (68.5) | 24.9 (76.8) | 27.3 (81.1) | 30.9 (87.6) | 32.4 (90.3) | 29.0 (84.2) | 23.9 (75.0) | 18.0 (64.4) | 12.3 (54.1) | 21.3 (70.3) |
| Daily mean °C (°F) | 5.6 (42.1) | 6.7 (44.1) | 10.1 (50.2) | 14.9 (58.8) | 19.5 (67.1) | 23.0 (73.4) | 26.8 (80.2) | 27.7 (81.9) | 24.2 (75.6) | 18.7 (65.7) | 12.9 (55.2) | 7.5 (45.5) | 16.5 (61.7) |
| Mean daily minimum °C (°F) | 1.2 (34.2) | 1.9 (35.4) | 5.1 (41.2) | 9.6 (49.3) | 14.5 (58.1) | 19.3 (66.7) | 23.5 (74.3) | 24.1 (75.4) | 20.2 (68.4) | 13.9 (57.0) | 8.1 (46.6) | 2.9 (37.2) | 12.0 (53.7) |
| Record low °C (°F) | −7.4 (18.7) | −5.8 (21.6) | −3.8 (25.2) | −0.7 (30.7) | 5.0 (41.0) | 10.2 (50.4) | 15.1 (59.2) | 16.1 (61.0) | 9.6 (49.3) | 1.9 (35.4) | −1.3 (29.7) | −4.7 (23.5) | −7.4 (18.7) |
| Average precipitation mm (inches) | 53.0 (2.09) | 73.6 (2.90) | 119.1 (4.69) | 139.1 (5.48) | 168.8 (6.65) | 366.8 (14.44) | 394.6 (15.54) | 212.6 (8.37) | 171.1 (6.74) | 83.3 (3.28) | 85.3 (3.36) | 58.6 (2.31) | 1,925.8 (75.82) |
| Average precipitation days (≥ 1.0 mm) | 6.9 | 7.9 | 9.9 | 9.7 | 9.2 | 13.4 | 11.9 | 9.5 | 8.8 | 6.0 | 7.7 | 6.9 | 107.8 |
| Mean monthly sunshine hours | 140.7 | 149.7 | 174.7 | 188.8 | 199.1 | 132.3 | 188.0 | 217.1 | 185.0 | 191.9 | 156.4 | 143.1 | 2,066.7 |
Source: Japan Meteorological Agency

=== Demographics ===
Per Japanese census data, the population of Ōmuta has almost halved since 1960, as shown below.

Historical population
| Year | Pop. | ±% |
|---|---|---|
| 1940 | 177,034 | — |
| 1950 | 191,978 | +8.4% |
| 1960 | 205,766 | +7.2% |
| 1970 | 175,143 | −14.9% |
| 1980 | 163,000 | −6.9% |
| 1990 | 150,453 | −7.7% |
| 2000 | 138,629 | −7.9% |
| 2010 | 123,683 | −10.8% |
| 2020 | 109,466 | −11.5% |

== History ==
The area of Ōmuta is part of the ancient Chikugo Province. Kunugi, one of the neighborhoods in the current Ōmuta city, is mentioned in the Nihon Shoki in an entry dated 720 AD. In the late 12th century, three ponds were formed, supposedly as a result of volcanic activity. Miike, a neighborhood in Ōmuta, is named after those three ponds (三池, mi-ike). In 1469, a farmer named Denzaemon eventually found coal in the mountains when he made a bonfire. Coal mining would become the main industry in this area.

During the Edo period, Ōmuta was a part of Miike Domain, ruled by the Tachibana clan. In 1721, the first coal mine was opened. Following the Meiji restoration, the towns of Ōmuta and Miike were established on April 1, 1889 with the creation of the modern municipalities system. The Meiji government ran coal mining in Miike at first themselves, but soon sold it to a private company for a very low price, compared to its value, which caused a scandal.

On March 1, 1917, Ōmuta received city status. Ōmuta had developed as an industrial city, centered on the Miike coal mine, which existed from the 1860s until 1997. In 1891, a railway began to operate, connecting Ōmuta with Fukuoka. It is still operated today as the Kagoshima Main Line. In 1902, Miike Port opened on Ariake Bay. New coal mines were opened, and Ōmuta became an industrial center in this region. In 1908, Miike Port was opened to foreigners and in the next year the Trade Taxation Office was established along the port, as a branch of the Nagasaki Trade Taxation Office.

While miners enjoyed good wages, their working conditions were not very good, like many other Japanese laborers. In 1918 and 1924, big strikes and other protests arose. Through a series of protests and other activities, in the 1930s, many of the strikers' demands were met: women, prisoners, and horses were no longer found in mines, and miners were hired directly by the company.

In 1921 and 1941, mergers with neighboring towns and villages, including Ōmuta, occurred, and in 1941 the city became as large as it is now. The 1941 merger was a side effect of World War II: the government led mergers in many places, thinking it would make municipal administration more efficient. During the war, Ōmuta was bombed in 1944 and 1945, not only in industrial areas, but also downtown. The prisoner-of-war camp "Fukuoka 17", where allied prisoners were forced to work in the mines, was located in the outskirts of the city.

In 1959, Ōmuta recorded its largest population: 208,877. But Japanese industries began to switch from coal to oil. Coal mining became less profitable, and many mines were closed, but Miike remained one of the biggest coal mines in Japan until its closure in 1997. Many people left the city, since they couldn't find work. This had a major effect on the local economy: many downtown shops closed.

== Government ==
Ōmuta has a mayor-council form of government with a directly elected mayor and a unicameral city council of 23 members. Ōmuta contributes two members to the Fukuoka Prefectural Assembly. In terms of national politics, the city is part of the Fukuoka 7th district of the lower house of the Diet of Japan.

== Economy ==
For most of its history, Ōmuta was a coal town. The closure of the Miike mine caused rapid depopulation and redirection of the local economy. The economy of Ōmuta is mixed, with agriculture, commercial fishing, commerce, light manufacturing and chemicals. Another main industry is aluminium refining.

== Education ==
Ōmuta has 19 public elementary schools and eight public junior high schools operated by the city government, and four public high schools operated by the Fukuoka Prefectural Board of Education. There is also one national high school, two private junior high schools and three private high schools. The prefectural also operates one special education school for the handicapped. Kyushu Teikyo Junior College, formerly located in the city, closed in 2006.

== Transportation ==
=== Railways ===
JR Kyushu - Kyushu Shinkansen

Shin-Ōmuta

JR Kyushu - Kagoshima Main Line

JB Yoshino - Ginsui - Ōmuta

Nishitetsu Tenjin Ōmuta Line

- Nishitetsu Wataze - Kuranaga - Higashi-Amagi - Nishitetsu Ginsui - Shin-Sakaemachi - Ōmuta

=== Highways ===
- Kyushu Expressway
- National Route 208
- National Route 209
- National Route 389
- National Route 501

=== Seaports ===
- Port of Miike

== Sister cities ==
- Datong, Shanxi Province, China
- Muskegon, Michigan, United States

== Crime and safety ==
The Kyushu Seido-kai designated yakuza syndicate was headquartered in Ōmuta until its dissolution in 2013.

== Local attractions ==
- Former Miike Coal Mine, UNESCO World Heritage Site
- Kugurizuka Kofun, National Historic Site
- Haginoo Kofun, National Historic Site

== Notable residents of Ōmuta ==
- Mieno Eiko, politician
- Haruhiko Kuroda, governor of the Bank of Japan
