= Miike Struggle =

1960 violent labor dispute at a coal mine in western Kyushu, Japan

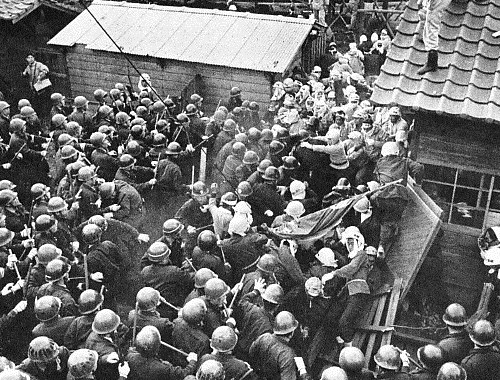
Police with helmets and batons clash with striking coal miners at the Miike mine, May 12, 1960

The Miike Struggle (三池闘争, Miike tōsō) was a year-long struggle in Japan in 1960 between the organized labor movement, backed by a variety of left wing groups, and big business organizations, backed by the Japanese right, centering around a lengthy labor dispute at the Miike coal mine on the west coast of Kyushu in southern Japan. Occurring at the climax of a long series of escalating strikes and other militant labor actions in 1950s Japan, the Miike Struggle was the largest labor-management dispute in Japanese history. Ultimately, the labor movement in Japan was defeated at Miike, dealing a significant blow to its prospects going forward.

== Background ==
The Miike coal mine in northern Kyushu had long been one of Japan's largest and most productive coal mines, dating back to its earliest exploitation by the Tachibana samurai clan in the early 1700s during the Edo Period. The mine was nationalized by the Meiji government in 1873, and was privatized and sold to the Mitsui zaibatsu in 1889.

Like all other industrialized nations, Japan and its wartime empire had been largely powered by coal. This made the Miike mine immensely profitable and one of the crown jewels of the Mitsui conglomerate's holdings. However, in the immediate postwar years, the discovery and exploitation of cheap and plentiful Middle Eastern oil led to an "energy revolution" as industries increasingly shifted to oil, reducing demand for coal. At the same time, the 1950s in Japan saw a great wave of mechanization and "workplace rationalization" that saw a reduction in demand for large numbers of manual laborers, including coal miners. In addition, the Income Doubling Plan, first formulated in 1959 and formally introduced in 1960, explicitly called for shifting government support away from "sunset" industries like coal mining in favor of "growth" industries such as oil refining and petrochemical manufacturing.

== Origins of the dispute ==
Noticing these shifts and anticipating future threats to the profitability of its coal mines, the Mitsui Corporation in 1959 announced that it would be laying off thousands of workers at its mines, including 1,462 layoffs at the Miike mine. With mechanization of mine functions proceeding at a rapid pace, this was seen to be the first in what might be many future rounds of layoffs. The Miike miners union was incredibly strong, and responded with massive protests and work stoppages by more than 30,000 miners and their families.

Mitsui decided to take the opportunity to break the powerful and militant Miike union once and for all. The Union was associated with the powerful, left-leaning Sōhyō labor federation, and had long been a thorn in Miike's side, launching several workplace actions including undertaking a major strike in 1953. On January 25, 1960, Mitsui locked the miners out of the mine, and immediately launched a concerted effort to split off some of the miners to form a more pliable "second union" and resume production at the mine.

== The struggle escalates ==
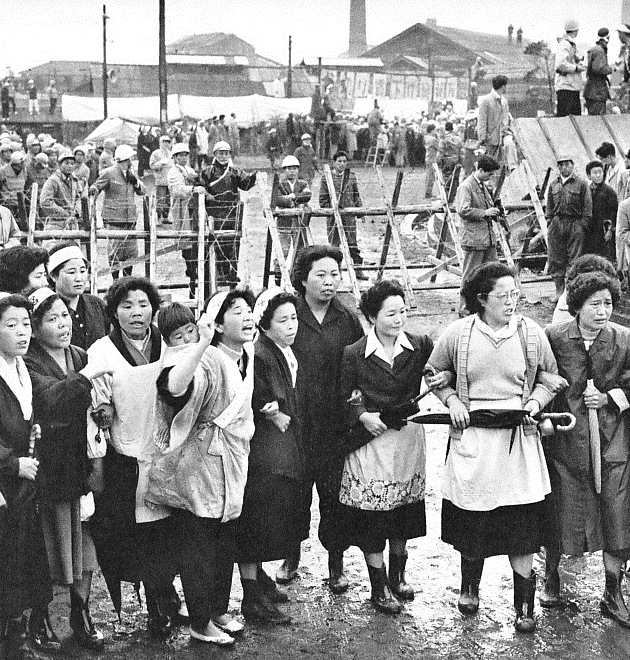
Miners' wives with arms linked form a picket line in front of the Miike mine to prevent second union miners from resuming production, April 20, 1960. Women were often put on the front lines in an effort to deter beatings by right-wing thugs.

Although Miike was a very large mine, and the Miike union was an important union within the Sōhyō federation, the Miike Struggle quickly escalated far out of proportion to the actual number of jobs at stake, as both sides decided that Miike would be the time and place to make a decisive stand. Donations began pouring into the Miike miners union not just from other Sōhyō-affiliated unions, but even from unions in more moderate labor federations, such as Zenrō, and from labor unions and federations in the United States and Europe. Likewise, the Japanese business world (Zaikai) made virtually unlimited financial resources available to Mitsui for the purpose of breaking the strike, including contributions from corporations and industries entirely unrelated to coal mining. Accordingly, the conflict rapidly assumed the feeling of an apocalyptic “all-management vs. all-labor” battle (sōshihon tai sōrōdō no tatakai) from which neither side felt it could back down.

Much of these funds were used to hire thousands of right-wing and yakuza thugs to beat up or otherwise intimidate and harass the locked-out miners. Bloody battles for control of the mine became an almost daily occurrence, especially after Mitsui finally succeeded in persuading some of the miners to form a second union on March 17. On March 29, one of the first-union miners, Kiyoshi Kubo, was stabbed to death by a yakuza gangster.

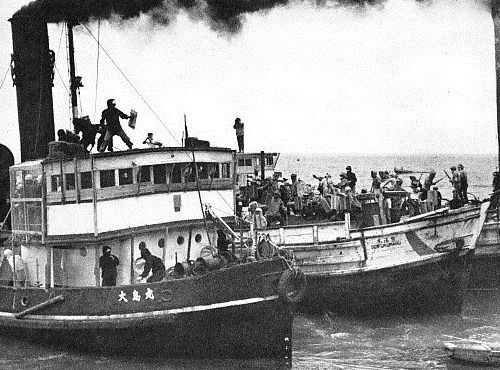
The "Battle of the Ariake Sea" - the first union boat battles the second union boat on June 19, 1960

Because the striking first-union miners were blocking access to the mine by land, Mitsui attempted to land second-union miners and mining supplies by boat from the sea. The first union responded by chartering a boat of its own and constantly shadowing the company's boat while attacking it with water cannons, hurled rocks, and ramming, in the so-called "Battle of the Ariake Sea."

== Further escalation ==
By May, with desertions to the second union increasing, the first union's cause was looking increasingly hopeless and support from the other unions began to waver. However on May 19, Japanese Prime Minister Nobusuke Kishi had police drag opposition lawmakers out of the National Diet and rammed through an unpopular revision to the U.S.-Japan Security Treaty (called "Anpo" in Japanese) with only members of his own party present. Kishi's actions led to outrage around the nation and a massive upsurge in the Anpo protests against the Treaty. Sympathy was extended to the striking miners, whom Kishi had opposed, and the Japanese labor movement became enamored of the idea of possibly "linking up Anpo and Miike," leading to a new surge in support for the striking miners.

Once the new treaty took effect on June 19, the Anpo protests came to an end, freeing up thousands of left-wing activists who had previously been busy protesting the treaty. Many of these activists then travelled down to Kyushu to support the miners at Miike. However, the end of the Anpo protests also freed up thousands of right-wing counter-protesters as well, who also traveled to Miike to fight for the other side, leading to a dramatic upsurge in violent clashes in late June and July. Big business was growing tired of funding the endless conflict, and pressure mounted on Kishi to bring the strike to an end, so he dispatched 10,000 riot police to quell the violence, and a decisive battle (kessen) between the police and the miners seemed imminent. However, Kishi was forced to resign on July 15 to take responsibility for his mishandling of the treaty issue, leading to a pause in strikebreaking operations at Miike.

== Resolution ==
New Prime Minister Hayato Ikeda, a former member of the Ministry of Finance and a close ally of the business world, made finding a peaceful resolution to the strike his first priority upon taking office. To accomplish this, he took the very unusual step of appointing a member of a rival faction within the ruling Liberal Democratic Party, Hirohide Ishida, as Labor Minister, because Ishida was seen as more sympathetic to labor unions, and dispatched Ishida to negotiate a solution.

With both the business world and the labor movement having become exhausted by the lengthy battle, Ishida was successful in getting both sides to submit to binding arbitration by the Central Labour Relations Commission (CLRC). The miners calculated that they had shown their determination, and that they could always go on strike again, and thus that the CLRC would have to grant them some concessions. However, when the CLRC issued its decision on August 10, it sided almost entirely with Mitsui, granting the miners the rather meaningless gesture of having the company formally "rescind" the layoffs while still insisting that those same miners "voluntarily retire."

The first union was outraged and immediately announced a resumption of their strike, but after weeks of debate the Sōhyō labor federation announced that it was withdrawing its support for the strike. Completely isolated, the first union held on for a little longer but was ultimately forced to capitulate. On December 1, 1960, the first union-miners returned to work, ending an unprecedented 312-day lockout.

== Legacy ==
The Miike Struggle is widely regarded as the high point of postwar labor militancy in Japan, when the Japanese labor movement was at the height of its power. After the labor movement was defeated at Miike, it gradually retreated from militancy, leading to a more cooperative culture with more open lines of communication between management and labor in Japan. Sōhyō in particular was weakened by the Miike Struggle, and thereafter increasingly lost ground to more moderate labor federations such as Zenrō.

Mitsui's near-total victory in the Miike Struggle allowed the company to replace the militant first union with the much more cooperative second union. This in turn allowed Mitsui to lay off more miners and significantly relax safety standards in the mine. By 1963, the number of miners working at Miike had fallen by one third, from around 15,000 in 1960 to just 10,000, yet in the same period, coal production was accelerated from 8,000 tons to 15,000 tons per day. On November 9, 1963, the worst mining disaster in Japan's postwar era occurred at Miike when coal dust ignited and exploded 500 feet below the surface, collapsing tunnels and spreading deadly carbon monoxide throughout the mine. As a result, 458 miners were killed and 555 were injured.
