= Yoshino Station =

Yoshino Station (吉野駅) may refer to:

- Yoshino Station (Fukuoka), a railway station on the Kagoshima Main Line
- Yoshino Station (Nara), a terminus of the Kintetsu Railway Yoshino Line
- Yoshinobu Station, formerly called Yoshino, a railway station in Matsuno, Ehime, Japan
