= Yanagawa Domain =

Japanese feudal domain located in Chikugo province

Yanagawa Domain 柳河藩
- Domain of Japan
- 1600–1871
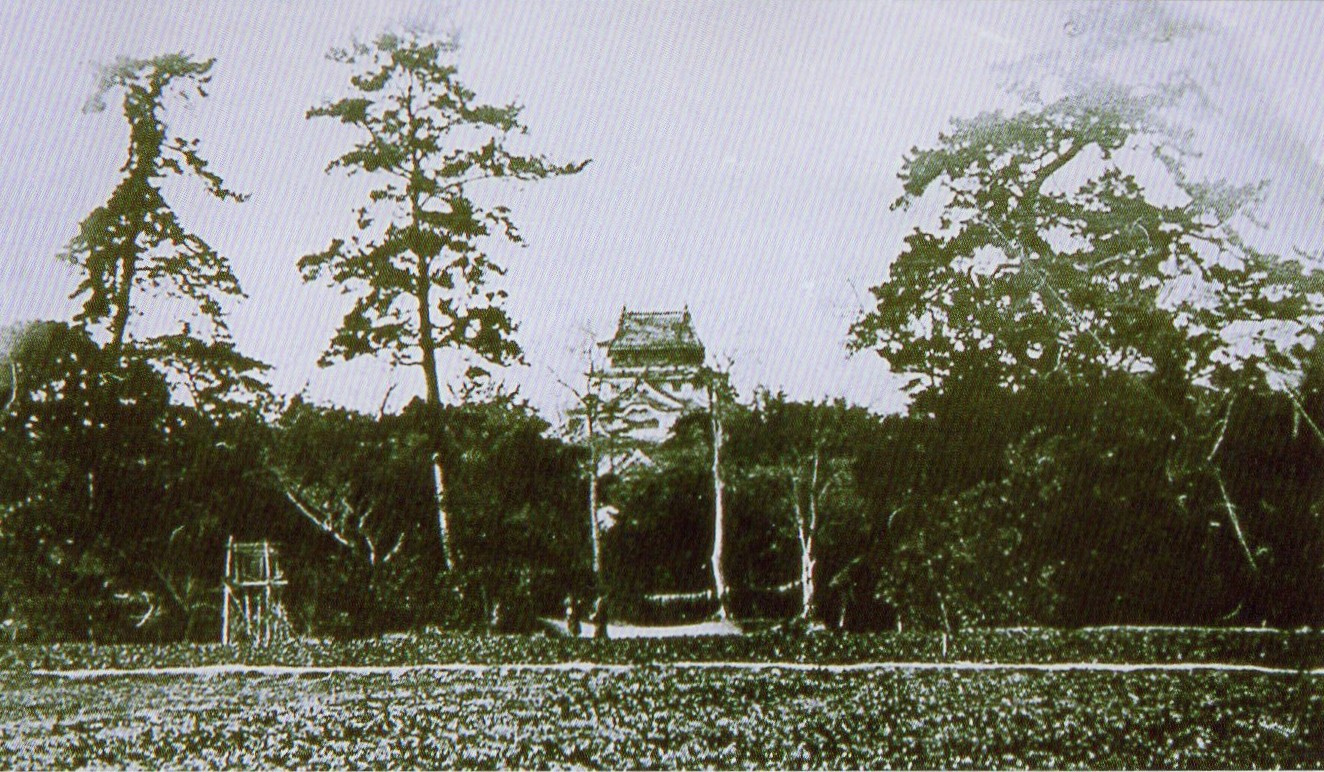
- Yanagawa Castle

- Mon of the Tachibana clan
- Capital: Yanagawa Castle
- Area
  - Coordinates: 33°9′38.6″N 130°24′3″E
  - Type: Daimyō
- Historical era: Edo period
  - Established: 1600
  - Disestablished: 1871
- Today part of: Fukuoka Prefecture
- Location of Yanagawa Castle Yanagawa Domain (Japan)

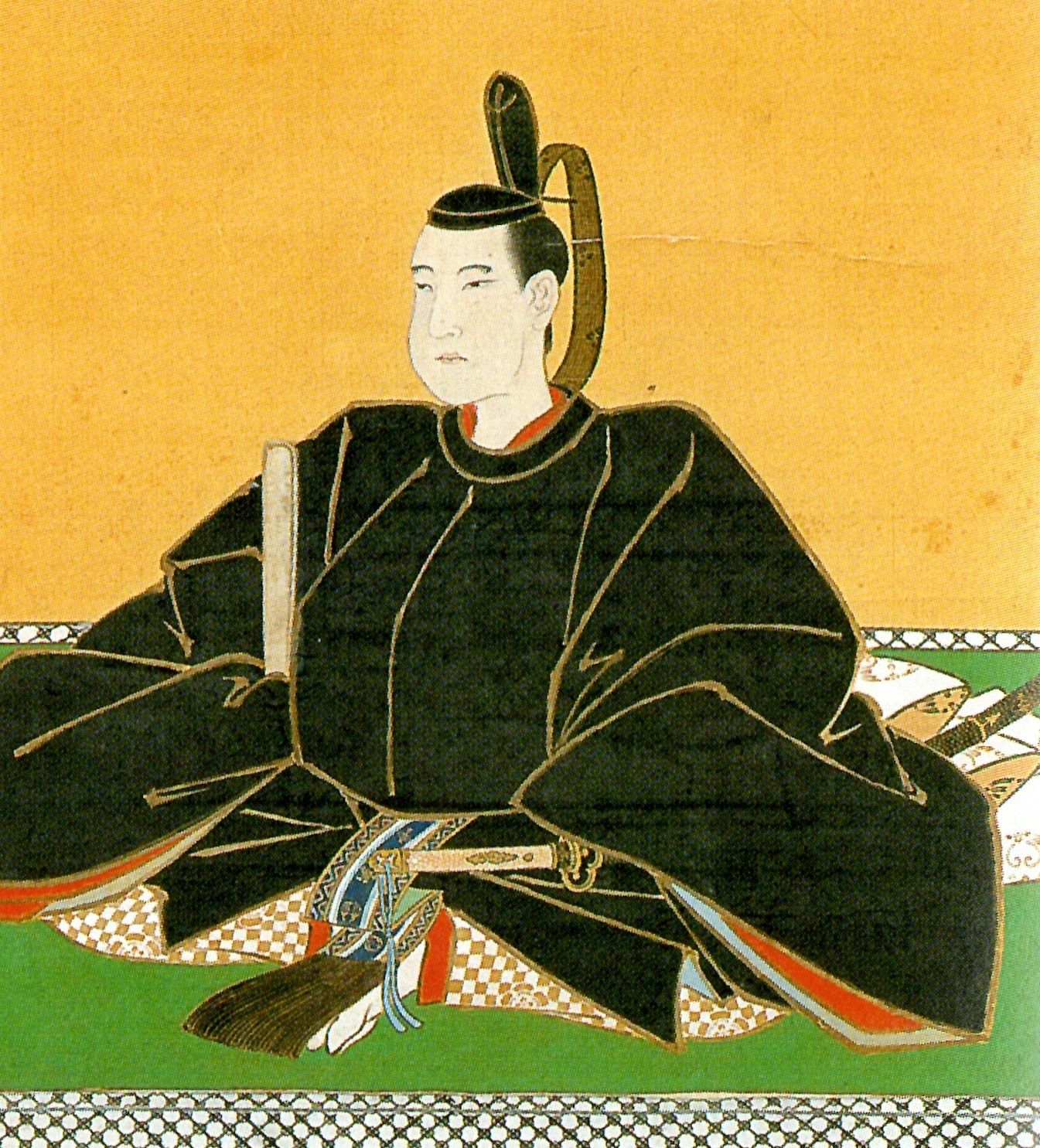
Tachibana Akinobu, 11th daimyō of Yanagawa Domain

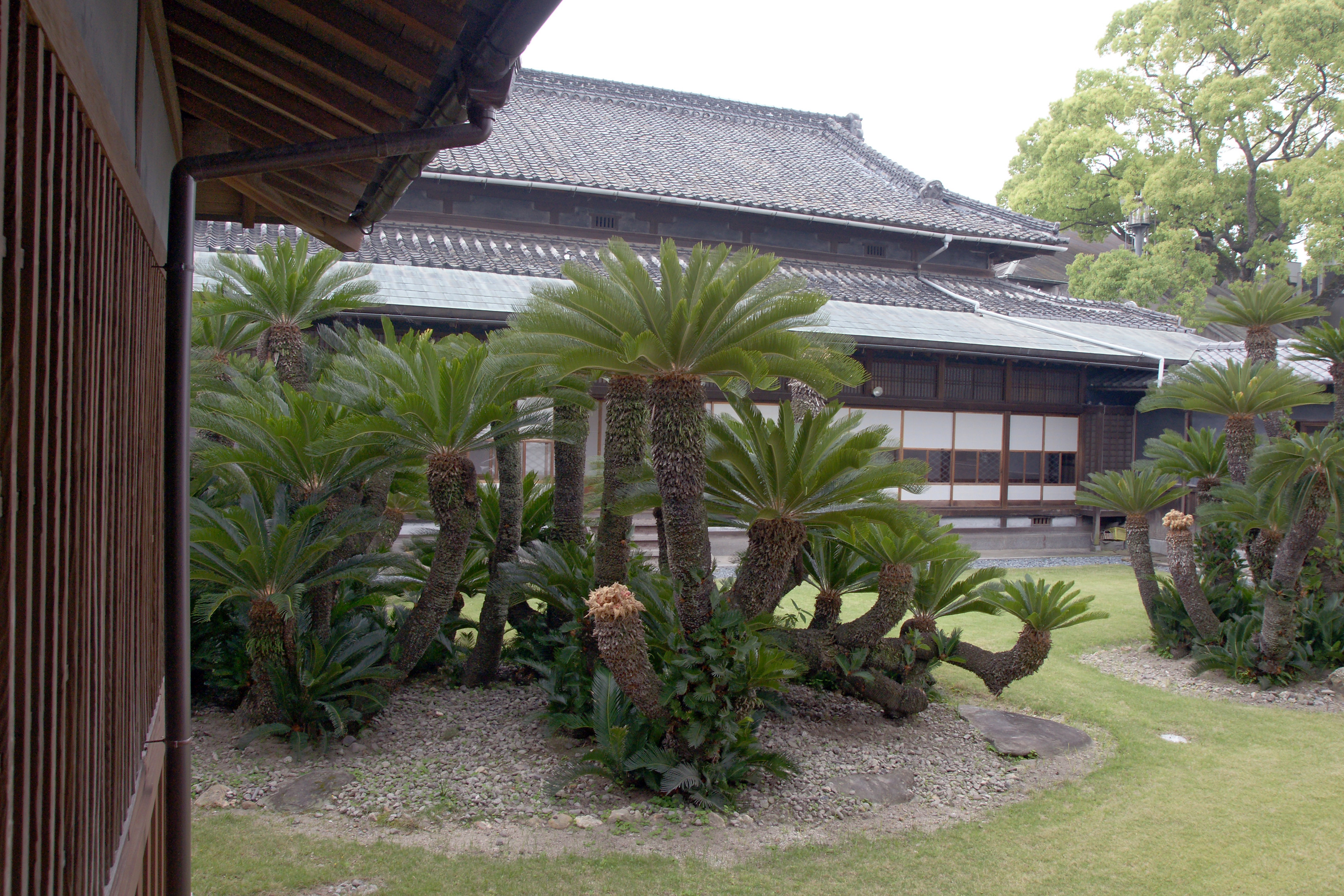
Ohana detached residence of Yanagawa Domain in Yanagawa

Yanagawa Domain (柳河藩, Yanagawa-han) was a feudal domain under the Tokugawa shogunate of Edo period Japan, in what is now eastern Fukuoka Prefecture. It was centered around Yanagawa Castle in what is now the city of Yanagawa, Fukuoka and was ruled by the tozama daimyō Tachibana clan for much of its history.

== History ==
Following Toyotomi Hideyoshi's conquest of Kyushu of 1586-1587, he assigned Tachibana Muneshige as castellan of Yanagawa Castle with a fief of 132,000 koku. However, at the Battle of Sekigahara in 1600 he sided with the pro-Toyotomi Western Army, and was dispossessed by the victorious Tokugawa Ieyasu. The Tokugawa shogunate demoted him to 30,000 koku at Tanagura Domain in Mutsu Province.

In the same year, Tanaka Yoshimasa, the castellan of Okazaki Castle in Mikawa Province, was awarded 325,000 koku in Chikugo Province for his achievement in capturing Ishida Mitsunari and entered Yanagawa Castle. Yoshimasa vigorously carried out the maintenance of the territory, such as renovating the Chikugo River, encouraging the development of new paddy fields, and building a 32-kilometer embankment on the coast of the Ariake Sea. He was succeeded by his son, Tanaka Tadamasa, who died of illness without heir in 1620, causing attainder of the domain.

The former Tanaka territory was divided, and Tachibana Muneshige, who had managed to receive a pardon, returned to Yanagawa Castle with an increase in kokudaka to 109,000 koku. In addition, in the following year (1621), Tachibana Tanetsugu, a nephew of Muneshige, entered established Miike Domain with a kokudaka of 10,000 koku.

Under the second daimyō, Tachibana Tadashige, stipends for vassals was changed in 1658 from a land-based system to fixed payments from the domain treasury, with all lands now coming during the direct control of the domain. Under the fourth daimyō, Tachibana Akitaka, a daimyō residence called "Shukkei-tei" was erected to the west of the castle in 1697. In 1738, the Ōoku of Yanagawa Domain was relocated from the Ni-no-maru enclosure of Yanagawa Castle to this mansion, which was the renamed "Ohana". This building still exists as the Japanese-style inn "Ohana" run by the Tachibana family.

After Tachibana Taneyoshi, the daimyō of Miike Domain was dispossessed in 1806 and sent to Shimotedo Domain in Mutsu Province, the territory of Miike Domain became tenryō under direct control of the Tokugawa shogunate. However, in 1816, this territory was assigned to Yanagawa Domain to administer on behalf of the shogunate. In 1851, half the territory, or 5000 koku, was returned to Shimotedo Domain and after Miike Domain was re-established in 1867, custodianship of the territory ended.

The last daimyō of Yanagawa, Tachibana Akitomo, reformed the domain's administration, focusing on financial reconstruction by establishing domain monopolies and issuing large quantities of hansatsu paper money, which were used by Yanagawa merchants to buy local products, send them to Nagasaki to sell, and paid the profits from the trade back to the domain. He also made efforts to introduce Western-style guns in his military, and participated in the First and Second Chōshū expeditions on the side of the shogunate. During the Boshin War, he sided with the new government and fought in the Battle of Aizu, for which he received an increase of 5000 koku in 1869 by the Meiji government. In the same year, he became imperial governor of Yanagawa. In 1871 he moved to Tokyo by order of the new government following the abolition of feudal domains and establishment of prefectures. Yanagawa Castle was burnt down in 1872, possibly as a measure to prevent the Tachibana family treasures from being confiscated by the new government. In 1871, after briefly becoming "Yanagawa Prefecture", it was incorporated into Fukuoka Prefecture through "Mizuma Prefecture".

Tachibana Akitomo became a count in the kazoku peerage in 1884.

== Holdings at the end of the Edo period ==
As with most domains in the han system, Yanagawa Domain consisted of several discontinuous territories calculated to provide the assigned kokudaka, based on periodic cadastral surveys and projected agricultural yields.

- Chikugo Province
  - 115 villages in Yamato District
  - 27 villages in Mizuma District
  - 55 villages in Miike District
  - 10 villages in Shimotsuma District
  - 18 villages in Kamitsuma District

== List of daimyō ==
#	Name	Tenure	Courtesy title	Court Rank	kokudaka
Tanaka clan, 1600–1620 (Tozama daimyō)
1	Tanaka Yoshimasa (義政田中)	1600–1609	Hyōbu-taifu(兵部大輔)	Junior 4th Rank, Lower Grade (従五位下)	325,000 koku
2	Tanaka Tadamasa (田中忠正)	1609–1620	Chikugo-no-kami(筑後守)	Junior 4th Rank, Lower Grade (従五位下)	325,000 koku
Tachibana clan, 1620–1871 (Tozama daimyō)
1	Tachibana Muneshige (立花宗茂)	1620–1638	Sakon'e-no-shōgen (左近将監)	Junior 4th Rank, Lower Grade (従四位下)	109,000 koku
2	Tachibana Tadashige (立花忠重)	1638–1664	Sakon'e-no-shōgen (左近将監)	Junior 4th Rank, Lower Grade (従四位下)	109,000 koku
3	Tachibana Akitora (立花秋虎)	1664–1696	Sakon'e-no-shōgen (左近将監)	Junior 4th Rank, Lower Grade (従四位下)	109,000 koku
4	Tachibana Akitaka (立花明隆)	1696–1721	Hida-no-kami(飛騨守)	Junior 4th Rank, Lower Grade (従五位下)	109,000 koku
5	Tachibana Sadayoshi (立花貞俶)	1721–1744	Hida-no-kami(飛騨守)	Junior 4th Rank, Lower Grade (従五位下)	109,000 koku
6	Tachibana Sadanori (立花貞則)	1744–1746	Hida-no-kami(飛騨守)	Junior 4th Rank, Lower Grade (従五位下)	109,000 koku
7	Tachibana Akinao (立花鑑通)	1746–1797	Ukyō-no-daibu(左京大夫)	Junior 4th Rank, Lower Grade (従五位下)	109,000 koku
8	Tachibana Akihisa (立花鑑寿)	1797–1820	Sakon'e-no-shōgen (左近将監)	Junior 4th Rank, Lower Grade (従四位下)	109,000 koku
9	Tachibana Akikata (立花鑑賢)	1820–1830	Sakon'e-no-shōgen (左近将監)	Junior 4th Rank, Lower Grade (従四位下)	109,000 koku
10	Tachibana Akihiro (立花鑑広)	1830–1833	-None-	Junior 5th Rank, Lower Grade (従五位下)	109,000 koku
11	Tachibana Akinobu (立花鑑備)	1833–1845	Sakon'e-no-shōgen (左近将監)	Junior 4th Rank, Lower Grade (従四位下)	109,000 koku
12	Tachibana Akitomo (立花鑑寛)	1845–1871	Sakon'e-no-shōgen (左近将監)	Junior 4th Rank, Lower Grade (従四位下)	109,000 ->114,000 koku

== See also ==
- List of Han
- Abolition of the han system
