= Miike coal mine =

Defunct coal mine in Kyushu, Japan

Miike Coal Mine 三池炭鉱
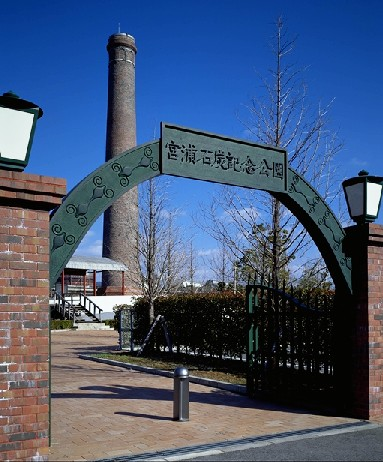
- Miike Coal Mine

- Location within Fukuoka Prefecture Location within Japan
- Location: Ōmuta, Fukuoka, Arao, Kumamoto, Japan; 33°00′49″N 130°27′22″E
- Products: Coal
- Location within Earth

UNESCO World Heritage Site
- Location: Japan
- Criteria: Cultural: (ii), (iv)
- Reference: 1484
- Inscription: 2015 (39th Session)

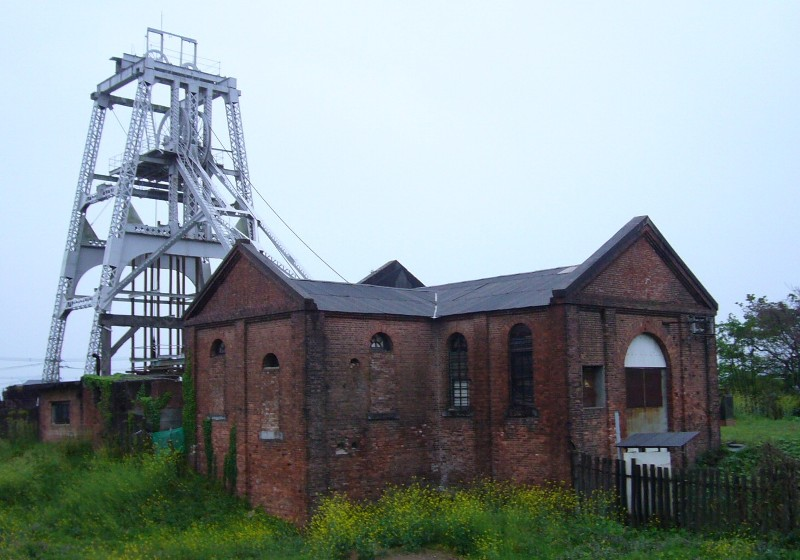
Miyahara Pit is one of the main mines in the Mitsui Miike Coal Mine from the late Meiji period to the early Showa period. The hoisting machine room (brick building) of the second shaft constructed in 1901 (Meiji 34) and the vertical shaft turret (made of total steel) are left in perfect condition and designated as an important cultural property and historic site of the country.

Miike coal mine (三池炭鉱, Miike Tankō), also known as the Mitsui Miike Coal Mine (三井三池炭鉱, Mitsui Miike Tankō), was the largest coal mine in Japan, located in the area of the city of Ōmuta, Fukuoka and Arao, Kumamoto, Japan.

In 1960, it was the setting for the "Miike Struggle," which was the largest management-labor dispute in Japanese history.

In 2015, it was registered as one of the assets of the UNESCO Sites of Japan's Meiji Industrial Revolution: Iron and Steel, Shipbuilding and Coal Mining World Heritage Site.

== History ==
=== Prewar history ===
Coal was discovered in this area by a farmer in 1469; however, commercial scale exploitation did not begin until 1721, when the karō of Miike Domain received permission to open a mine. In pre-industrial Japan, the main market for coal was for use in salt production in the Seto Inland Sea; however, in the Bakumatsu period, the importance of coal as a fuel for steam engines became increasing evident, and in 1872 the Meiji government nationalised the mine. The Mitsui zaibatsu took control in 1899. Almost immediately, prison labor began to be employed both inside and outside the mine. In 1876, the Mitsui & Co., Ltd. was established to exclusively handle the transportation and sales of coal from the mine. In 188, when the mine was privatized, Mitsui won a fierce bidding competition against the Mitsubishi zaibatsu for ownership. Dan Takuma, an official of the Mines Bureau of the Ministry of Industry who had studied mining and metallurgy in the United States, was assigned to oversee the Miike Coal Mine, and eventually rose to become Director-General of Mitsui. The mine operations were greatly expanded and gradually modernized. The use of convict labor was abolished in 1930, long after it had ceased to be used in other mines in Japan.

=== POW camp ===
During World War II the mine was used as a prisoner of war camp, referred to as Fukuoka #17 - Omuta. Approximately 1,735 American and Allied prisoners were used as slave labor to mine coal and work in a Mitsui zinc foundry. It was the largest POW camp in the Japanese Empire. 138 prisoners died, of disease, accidents, and abuse.

=== Postwar history ===
In 1958 Nippon Steel Mining began development of the Ariake Coal Mine in neighboring Takada Town; however, development was suspended due to ingress of spring water. The mine was acquired by Mitsu in 1972, and coal production was resumed in 1976, with a shaft connecting the Ariake Mine with the Miike Mine completed in 1977.

==== Labor disputes ====
In 1960, the mine became the center of a protracted labor dispute that evolved into the largest management-labor dispute in Japan's history. When the Mitsui corporation attempted to lay off nearly 1,500 workers at the mine, the powerful miners union responded with massive protests and work stoppages that led to Mitsui locking out the miners for 312 days. The resultant clashes between miners, police, and right-wing gangsters escalated into violence. Ultimately, the protesting miners were defeated, and returned to work without achieving their demands, dealing a significant blow to the Japanese labor movement as a whole.

==== Incidents ====
On November 9, 1963, 458 people were killed by an explosion and the resulting buildup of carbon monoxide. 438 of the deaths were due to carbon monoxide poisoning, and 839 others suffered from the effects of carbon monoxide poisoning, which can cause brain damage. In total, 1,197 of the 1,403 workers died or were injured as a result of the incident. Workers were told by the Mitsui Coal Mining company that a coal-dust explosion in the mine was impossible and were not educated on the potential for gas poisoning. The company had no provisions in place for isolating poisonous gas, in fact, at the time of the explosion, ventilation fans worked to actively spread the gas throughout the mine, leading to more deaths. Only around 200 of the workers knew of the explosion, mostly by hearing it firsthand. Despite making it to the lift, they were told by their officers not to leave and died due to carbon monoxide poisoning. The majority of the workers knew nothing of the explosion. Electricity and telephone communication were lost after the explosion, and initially, no attempts to rescue the workers were made by the company, which stated that it was too risky due to unclear conditions within the mine. As a result, workers remained trapped in the mine for three hours after the company was notified. The inexperienced, ill-advised rescue crews exacerbated the severity of the event by not following the protocols for rescuing victims of carbon monoxide poisoning. Over 200 of the workers who were already suffering from poisoning were sent back into the mines to attempt to rescue others. Of the 939 workers that survived, 839 suffered from serious carbon monoxide poisoning, which resulted in severe, permanent brain damage.

In July 1967, 66 housewives from the Carbon Monoxide Poisoning Patients Family Association staged a sit-in at the bottom of the Mikawa mine from the 14th to the 20th of the same month to protest failure of the company to provide compensation.

On January 18, 1984, an explosion at the mine claimed the lives of 83 workers.

== Legacy ==
The mine closed on March 30, 1997. with devastating effects on the local economy. In the 1960s and 1970s, Japan's primary energy source switched from coal to oil, and demand for coal shifted from high-cost domestic coal to low-cost imported coal. Due to currency exchange rates, compensation claims for mining accidents, rising labor costs, etc., it was no longer possible to compete without government subsidies, which were scheduled to be discontinued from 2001. Mitsui there decided to terminate operations.

After the mine closed, the Miyahara Pit ruins and the Manda Pit were designated as National Important Cultural Properties in 1998 and as National Historic Sites in 2000. The chimney of the Miyaura Pit Ruins and the former Mikawa Electric Railway substation were registered as National Registered Tangible Cultural Properties in 2000.

The Miike mine was the subject of a Japanese documentary, Echoes from the Miike Mine (2006), directed by Hiroko Kumagai.

=== World Heritage Site ===
In 2015, the Miike Coal Mine, Miike Coal Mine Railway (some sections of which are currently used as the Mitsui Chemicals Railway) and Miike Port (opened in 1908, lock facilities, Daikongo Maru, a steam-powered crane ship that was used during port construction, former Nagasaki Customs Miike Branch Office), were designated as part of the UNESCO World Industrial Heritage series "Japan's Meiji Industrial Revolution: Iron and Steel, Shipbuilding and Coal Mining." The award was dependent upon Japan's promise to tell the "full history" of these sites that included a history of its forced labor for Koreans, Chinese, convicts, and POWs. On July 22, 2021, UNESCO's World Heritage Committee found that Japan had not fulfilled its pledge and they were asked to come up with a new plan by December 2021.

== See also ==
- Miike Struggle
- Sites of Japan's Meiji Industrial Revolution: Iron and Steel, Shipbuilding and Coal Mining
- List of Historic Sites of Japan (Fukuoka)
- Tankō Bushi
