= Kyushu Teikyo Junior College =

Private junior college in Japan

- 帝京大学福岡短期大学
- Type: Private
- Active: 1987–2006
- Location: Ōmuta, Fukuoka, Japan

Kyushu Teikyo Junior College (帝京大学福岡短期大学, Teikyō Daigaku Fukuoka Tanki Daigaku) was a private junior college in Ōmuta, Fukuoka, Japan.

== History ==
The junior college was founded as a women's junior college in 1987. It became coeducational in 1998. In 1999, the name was changed from (九州帝京短期大学) to (帝京大学福岡短期大学). It closed in 2006.

== Academic departments ==
- Culture of Japan
- International communication
- Management information

== See also ==
- List of junior colleges in Japan
