= Kugurizuka Kofun =

- 潜塚古墳 (Japanese)
- Kugurizuka Kofun Kugurizuka Kofun (Japan)
- Interactive map of Kugurizuka Kofun
- 33°00′58″N 130°27′04″E
- Type: Kofun
- Periods: Kofun period
- Location: 1-429 Koganecho, Ōmuta, Fukuoka, Japan
- Region: Kyushu

History
- Built: c.5th century

Site notes
- Public access: Yes (no facilities)

The Kugurizuka Kofun (潜塚古墳) is a Kofun period burial mound, located in the Koganecho neighborhood of the city of Ōmuta, Fukuoka Prefecture Japan. The tumulus was designated a National Historic Site of Japan in 1977.

== Overview ==
This Kugurizuka Kofun is an enpun (円墳)-style circular tumulus, located on a small independent hill to the east of the city of Ōmuta; however, its original shape has been lost due to the surrounding area being turned into agricultural land and research in 2001 revealed the possibility that it was a keyhole-shaped tumulus. The tumulus has a diameter of 30 meters and a height of 6.5 meters, but its original height is estimated to be about eight meters. As for the internal structure, two box-shaped sarcophagi were found in the center of the mound, arranged side by side with their main axes oriented roughly north–south during archaeological excavations in 1965. No traces of fukiishi or haniwa were found.

The western sarcophagus is made of tuff, and is approximately 1.7 meters long, 0.4 to 0.5 meters wide, and 0.45 to 0.5 meters deep. It was surrounded by stones the size of a human head, and the inside was painted vermilion. Along with human bones, grave goods included a dragon and tiger image bronze mirror, and two pipe balls. An iron sword, two iron daggers, and one iron sickle from outside the sarcophagus.

The east sarcophagus is set 1.3 meters apart and is roughly the same size as the west sarcophagus, and is made of sandstone. It was built by demolishing part of the western sarcophagus, so it is a later burial. The style of the sarcophagus was typical of northern Kyushu dating back to the Yayoi period, but the grave goods show a distinctive Kinai region influence. An antechamber was attached to the front end of the sarcophagus, and two Haji ware jars were placed near the south end. Inside the west sarcophagus, was bronze mirror fragments with inner flower patterns. Outside the sarcophagus, there were 47 bronze arrowheads, one hoe point, one sickle, two axes, two planes, some other iron fragments, and two Haji pottery pots.

From the grave goods it was estimated that this tumulus dates from the mid-5th century, although more recent research indicates that it may actually date from the early 4th century, or early Kofun period. Excavated items are displayed at the Ōmuta City Historical Museum.

The tumulus is located on a hill about 150 meters northeast of Harumakita Elementary School, approximately a 20-minute walk from Ōmuta Station on the JR Kyushu Kagoshima Main Line.

== See also ==
- List of Historic Sites of Japan (Fukuoka)
