= Mieno Eiko =

Japanese politician (1926–2013)

Mieno Shigeko
- みえの しげこ

Personal details
- Born: May 10, 1926 Ōmuta, Fukuoka Prefecture, Japan
- Died: November 27, 2013 (aged 87)
- Party: Social Democratic Party (Japan)
- Education: Kyushu University
- Occupation: politician

Mieno Shigeko (Japanese: みえの しげこ; 10 May 1926 – 27 November 2013), better known as Mieno Eiko (Japanese: 三重野栄子), was a Japanese politician for the Social Democratic Party (SDP).

Born in Ōmuta, Fukuoka, Mieno enrolled into the Kyushu Imperial University, in 1951, and graduated from the Faculty of Economics also in 1951. In the same year, she served as general secretary and union member of the department store chain Iwataya. In 1988, she was appointed vice chairman of the Social Democratic Party. She also served as a member of the House of Councillors, in 1995 and 2001.

Mieno died of chronic heart failure on 27 November 2013, aged 87.
