= Ginsui Station =

Railway station in Ōmuta, Fukuoka Prefecture, Japan

JB 26 Ginsui Station 銀水駅
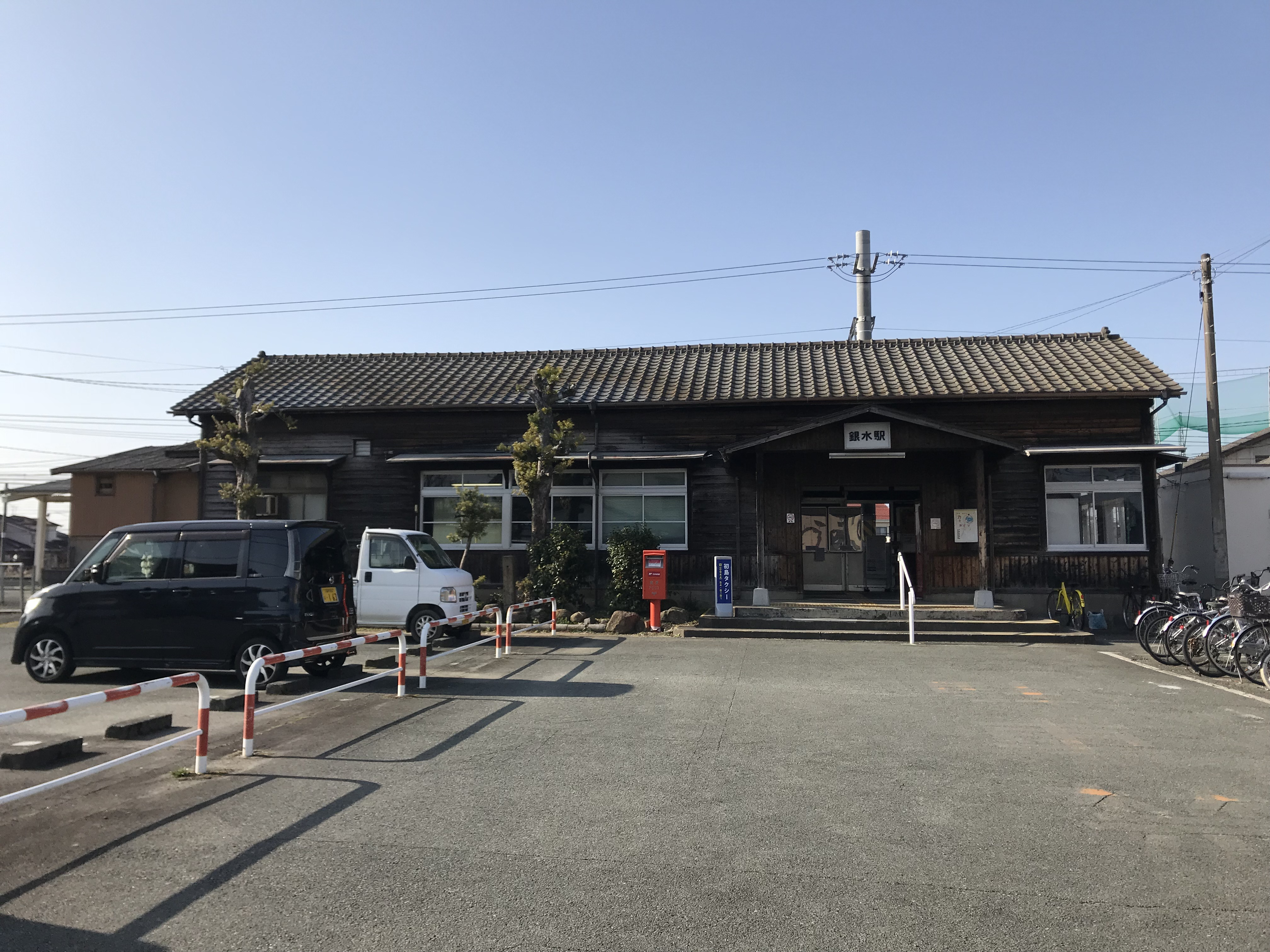
- Ginsui Station in 2018

General information
- Location: 229 Kusagi, Omuta-shi, Fukuoka-ken 837-0917; Japan
- Coordinates: 33°03′17″N 130°27′40″E
- Operator: JR Kyushu
- Line: JB Kagoshima Main Line
- Distance: 144.3 km from Mojikō
- Platforms: 1 side + 1 island platforms
- Tracks: 3

Construction
- Structure type: At grade
- Parking: Available
- Accessible: No - platforms linked by footbridge

Other information
- Status: Kan'i itaku ticket window
- Website: Official website

History
- Opened: 15 April 1926

Passengers
- FY2020: 540 daily

Services
Preceding station	JR Kyushu	Following station
Ōmuta towards Kagoshima	Kagoshima Main Line	Yoshino towards Mojikō
Location
- Location within Fukuoka Prefecture Location within Japan

Ginsui Station (銀水駅, Ginsui-eki) is a passenger railway station located in the city of Ōmuta, Fukuoka Prefecture, Japan. It is operated by JR Kyushu.

== Lines ==
The station is served by the Kagoshima Main Line and is located 144.3 km from the starting point of the line at Mojiko. Only local services on the line stop at the station.

== Layout ==
The station consists of a side platform and an island platform serving three tracks. The station building is a wooden structure in traditional Japanese style with a tiled roof. It houses a waiting area, a ticket window and an automatic ticket vending machine. Access to the island platform is by means of a footbridge.

Since 2010, the staffing of the ticket window has been entrusted to the Ōmuta Tourist Association. The ticket window is equipped with a POS machine but does not have a Midori no Madoguchi facility.

=== Platforms ===
1, 2	■ JB Kagoshima Main Line	for Ōmuta, Kumamoto and Yatsushiro
3	■ JB Kagoshima Main Line	for Kurume, Tosu and Hakata

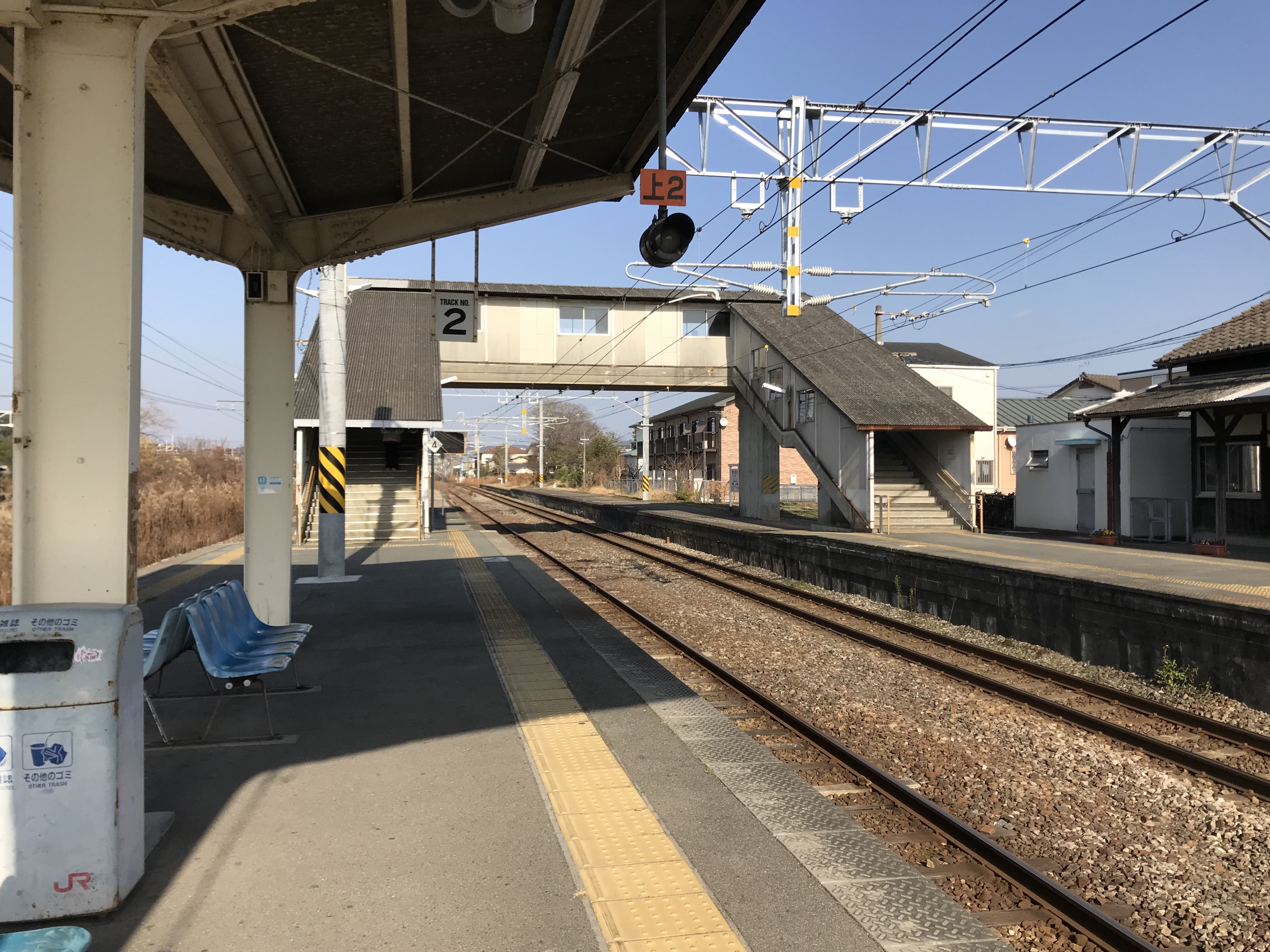
A view of the platforms and tracks.

== History ==
Japanese Government Railways (JGR) opened the station on 15 April 1926 as an additional station on the existing track of the Kagoshima Main Line. With the privatization of Japanese National Railways (JNR), the successor of JGR, on 1 April 1987, JR Kyushu took over control of the station.

== Passenger statistics ==
In fiscal 2020, the station was used by an average of 540 passengers daily (boarding passengers only), and it ranked 207th among the busiest stations of JR Kyushu.

== Surrounding area ==
- Fukuoka Prefectural Miike High School
- Omuta Junior and Senior High School
- Fukuoka Prefecture Saiseikai Omuta Hospital

== See also ==
- List of railway stations in Japan
