= Chikugo Province =

Former province of Japan

Map of Japanese provinces (1868) with Chikugo Province highlighted

Chikugo Province (筑後国, Chikugo no Kuni) (Note: Japanese pronunciation: [c̟͡ɕi̥.kɯ̈̀.ɡò̞ (nò̞ kɯ̈̀.ɲ̟ì), -kɯ̈̀.ŋò̞ (nò̞ kɯ̈̀.ɲ̟ì), -kɯ̈́.ɡò̞ (nò̞ kɯ̈̀.ɲ̟ì), -kɯ̈́.ŋò̞ (nò̞ kɯ̈̀.ɲ̟ì), -kɯ̈́.ɡó̞ (nò̞ kɯ̈̀.ɲ̟ì), -kɯ̈́.ŋó̞ (nò̞ kɯ̈̀.ɲ̟ì)]) was a province of Japan in the area of northern Kyūshū, corresponding to part of southwestern Fukuoka Prefecture. Chikugo bordered on Higo and Chikugo to the southeast, and Chikuzen to the north and east, Bungo to the east and Hizen to the west. Its abbreviated form name was Chikushū (筑州) (a name which it shared with Chikuzen Province), although it was also called Chikuin (筑陰). In terms of the Gokishichidō system, Chikugo was one of the provinces of the Saikaidō circuit. Under the Engishiki classification system, Chikugo was ranked as one of the "superior countries" (上国) in terms of importance, and one of the "far countries" (遠国) in terms of distance from the capital.

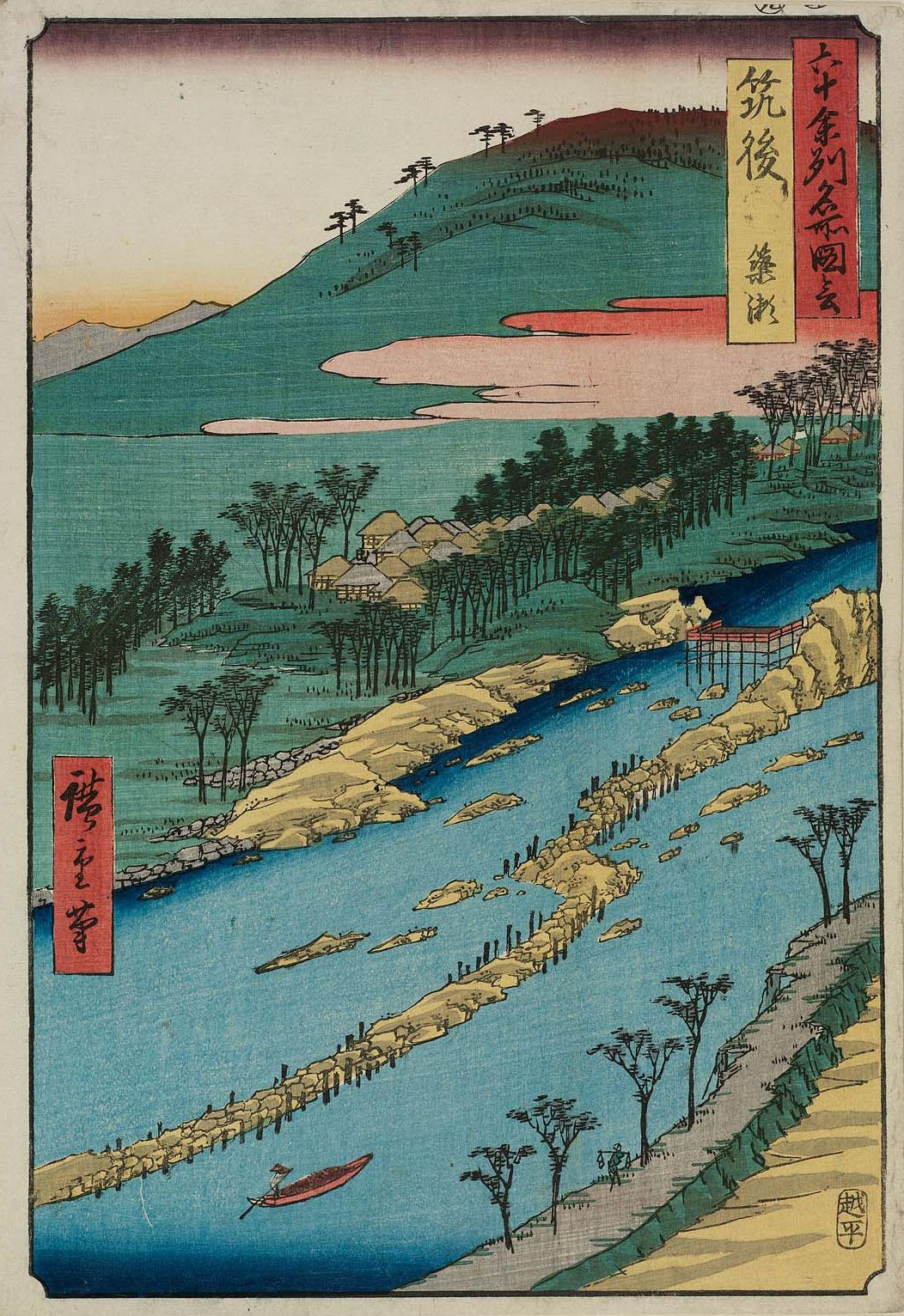
Hiroshige ukiyo-e "Chikugo" in "The Famous Scenes of the Sixty States" (六十余州名所図会), depicting the Chikugo Province: The Currents Around the Weir (Chikugo, Yanase) in 1855

== History ==
=== Early history ===
Ancient Tsukushi Province was a major power center in the Yayoi period, with contacts to the Asian mainland and may have been the site for the Kingdom of Yamatai mentioned in official Chinese dynastic Twenty-Four Histories for the 1st- and 2nd-century Eastern Han dynasty, the 3rd-century Records of the Three Kingdoms, and the 6th-century Book of Sui. During the Kofun period, many burial mounds were constructed and the area was ruled by a powerful clan who held the title of "Tsukushi no kuni no miyatsuko". The area was the launching point for Empress Jingu's purported conquest of Korea, and was the settlement area for many toraijin immigrants from China, Silla and Baekje. In 527, the Iwai Rebellion between rival factions supporting Silla against Yamato rule occurred. In 531, the priest Zensho arrived from Northern Wei and established Shugendo. In 663, the Yamato government, which was defeated by the combined Silla and Tang China forces at the Battle of Hakusonko, decided to establish Dazaifu as a regional military and civil administrative center, and after the Taika Reforms and the establishment of the Ritsuryō system in 701, Tsukushi Province was divided into Chikuzen and Chikugo Provinces.

The kokufu of Chikugo was located in what is now part of the city of Kurume, and its ruins are now a National Historic Site. The ruins of the Chikugo Kokubun-ji was also located in the same area, and are likewise a National Historic Site. The ichinomiya of Chikugo Province is Kōra taisha, also in Kurume and is also the Sōja shrine of the province.

=== Muromachi and Sengoku periods ===
- 1359 (Enbun 4): Battle of Chikugo River (Chikugogawa), Ashikaga gain a military victory.
- 1361 (Enbun 6) : Imperial forces led by Kikuchi Takemitsu capture Dazaifu.

During the Sengoku period, the shugo of the province was the Otomo clan; however, in reality the province was controlled by 15 petty warlords, from the Kamachi clan, Tajiri clan, Kuroki clan and others.

=== Edo period and early modern period ===
Chikugo under the Tokugawa shogunate was largely dominated by Kurume Domain, ruled by the Arima clan in the north, with a smaller area under the rule of Yanagawa Domain, ruled by the Tachibana clan in the south.

Bakumatsu period domains
Name	Clan	Type	kokudaka
Kurume	Arima	Fudai	210,000 koku
Yanagawa	Tachibana	Tozama	109,000 koku
Miike	Tachibana	Tozama	10,000 koku

Following the Boshin War and the Meiji restoration, former shogunal territory was assigned to Hita Prefecture on October 13, 1868, which was merged with Nagasaki Prefecture two weeks later. On November 11, 1868, Shimotedo Domain in Mutsu Province relocated its seat to Chikugo, and restored Miike Domain. With the abolition of the han system on December 25, 1871, Kurume, Yanagawa and Miike became prefectures, which were then united as "Mizuma Prefecture". On August 21, 1876, Mizuma Prefecture and merged into Fukuoka Prefecture.

Per the early Meiji period Kyudaka kyuryo Torishirabe-chō (旧高旧領取調帳), an official government assessment of the nation's resources, Chikugo Province had 789 villages with a total kokudaka of 536,851 koku. Chikugo Province consisted of:

Districts of Chikugo Province
District	kokudaka	villages	Controlled by	Notes
Ikuha District (生葉郡)	26,882 koku	59 villages	Kurume	merged with Takeno District to become Ukiha District (浮羽郡) on February 26, 1896
Kamitsuma District (上妻郡)	79,464 koku	115 villages	Kurume, Yanagawa	merged with Shimotsuma District to become Yame District (八女郡) on February 26, 1896
Mihara District (御原郡)	33,304 koku	36 villages	Kurume	merged with former Mii (御井郡) and Yamamoto Districts to become a new and expanded Mii District (三井郡) on February 26, 1896
Mii District (御井郡)	56,528 koku	72 villages	Kurume	absorbed Mihara and Yamamoto Districts to become a new and expanded Mii District (三井郡) on February 26, 1896
Miike District (三池郡)	53,125 koku	72 villages	tenryō, Yanagawa, Shimotedo	Dissolved
Mizuma District (三潴郡)	140,241 koku	164 villages	Kurume, Yanagawa	
Shimotsuma District (下妻郡)	29,920 koku	37 villages	Kurume, Yanagawa	merged with Kamitsuma District to become Yame District on February 26, 1896
Takeno District (竹野郡)	22,875 koku	89 villages	Kurume	merged with Ikuha District to become Ukiha District on February 26, 1896
Yamamoto District (山本郡)	16,559 koku	30 villages	Kurume	merged with former Mii (御井郡) and Mihara Districts to become a new and expanded Mii District (三井郡) on February 26, 1896
Yamato District (山門郡)	77,948 koku	115 villages	Yanagawa	merged with Ikuha District to become Ukiha District on February 26, 1896

== Gallery ==
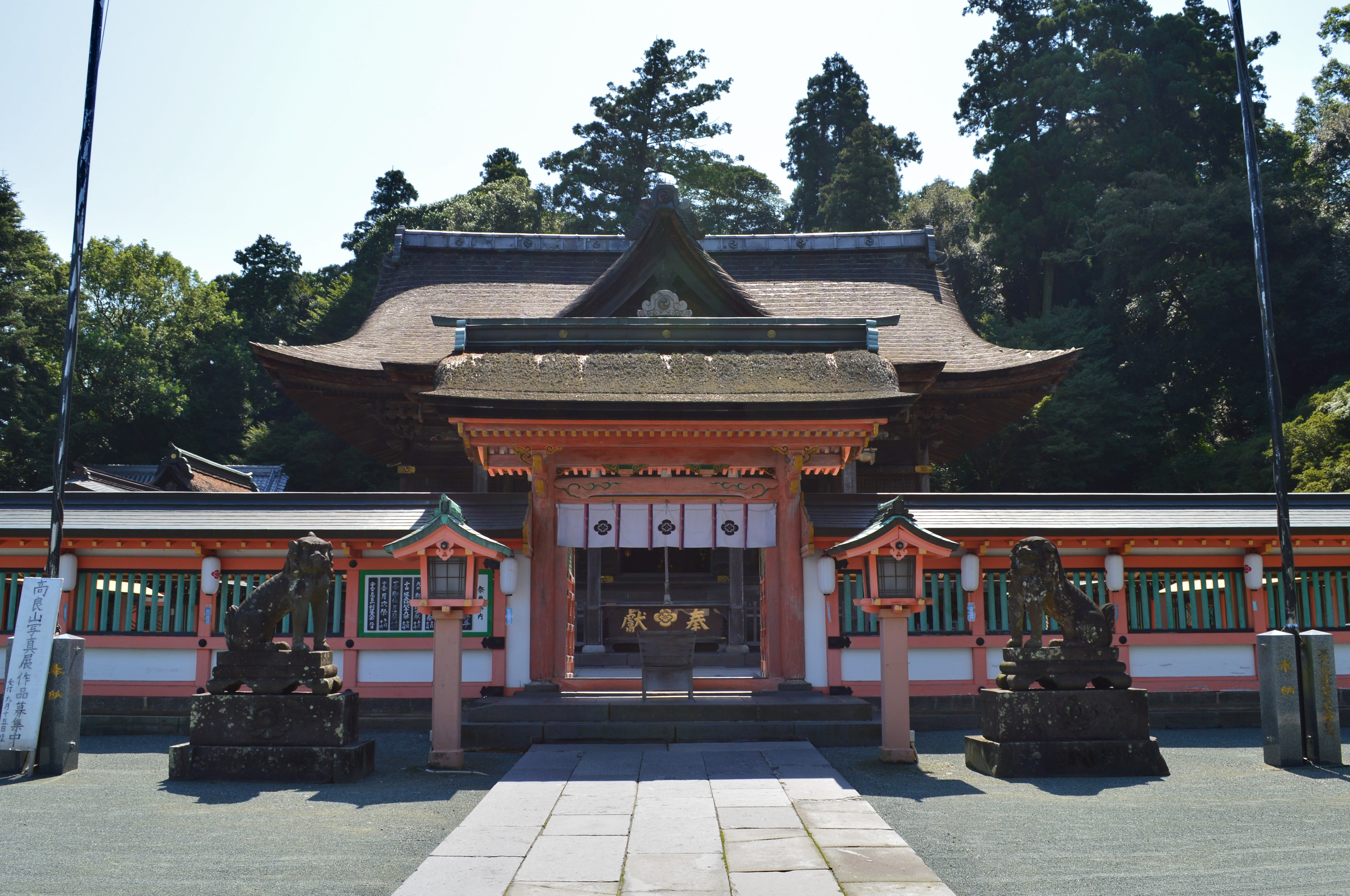
Kora taisha, the ichinomiya of the province

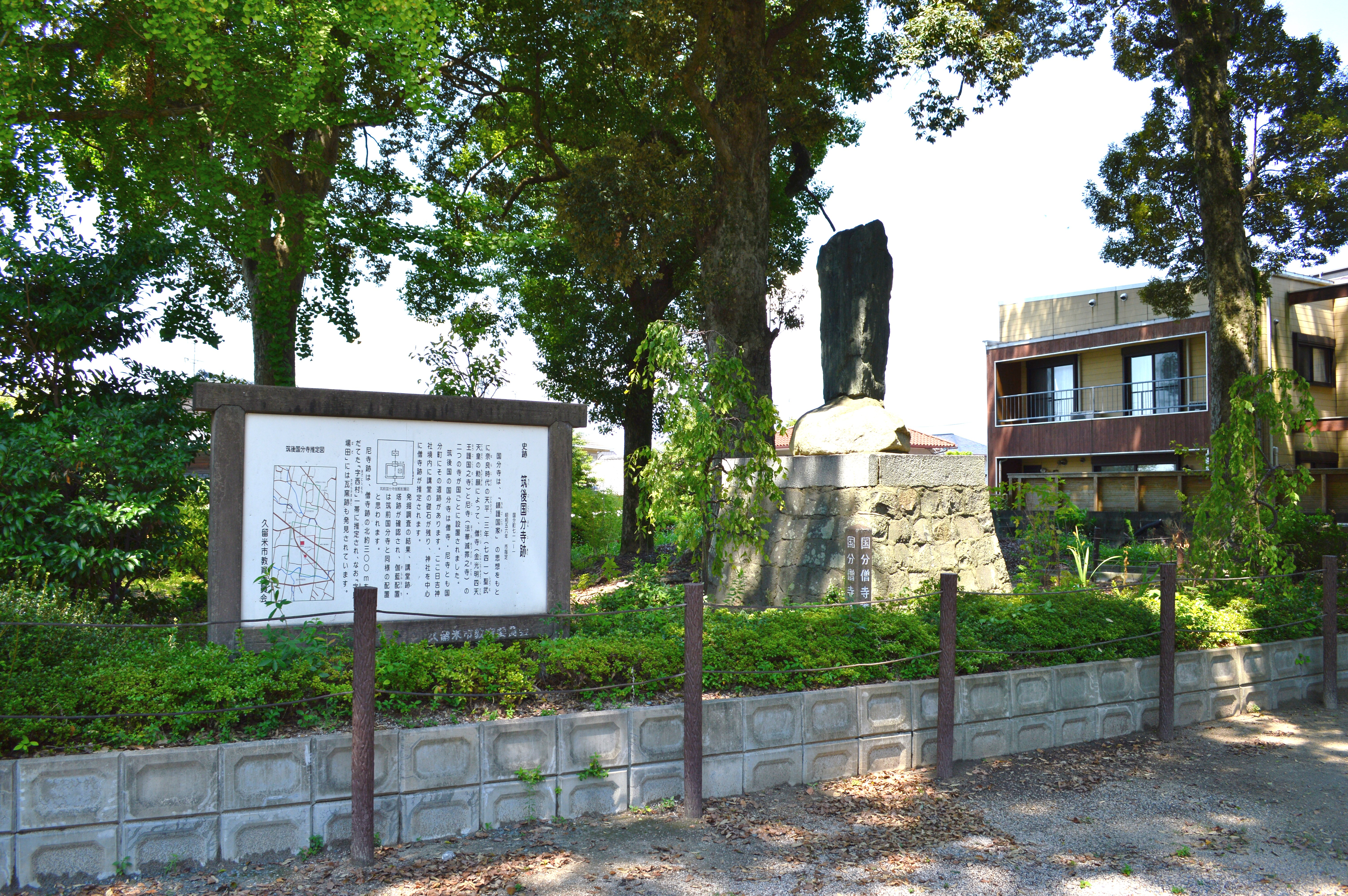
Site of the Chikugo Kokubun-ji

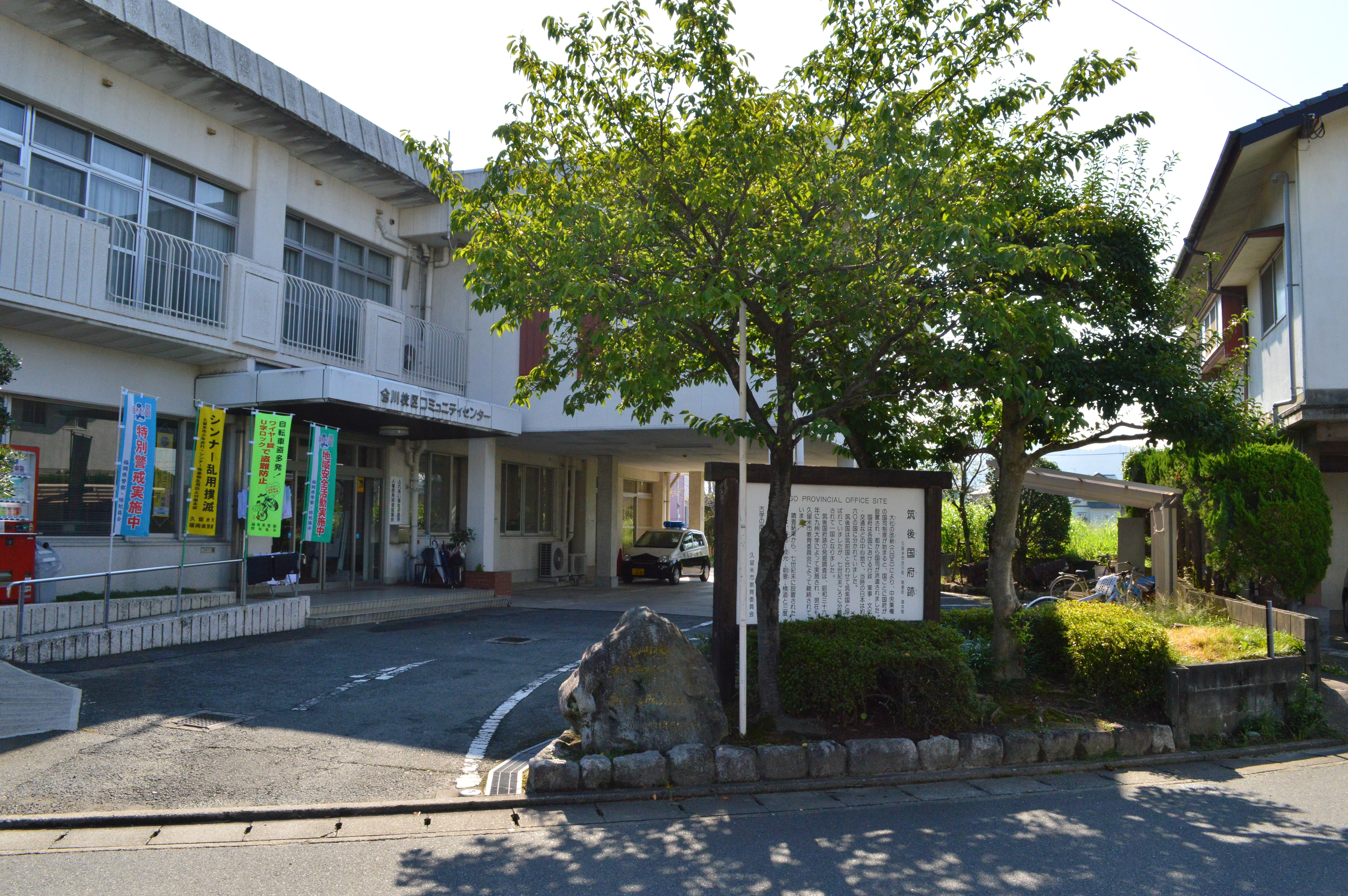
Site of the Chikugo Provincial Capital

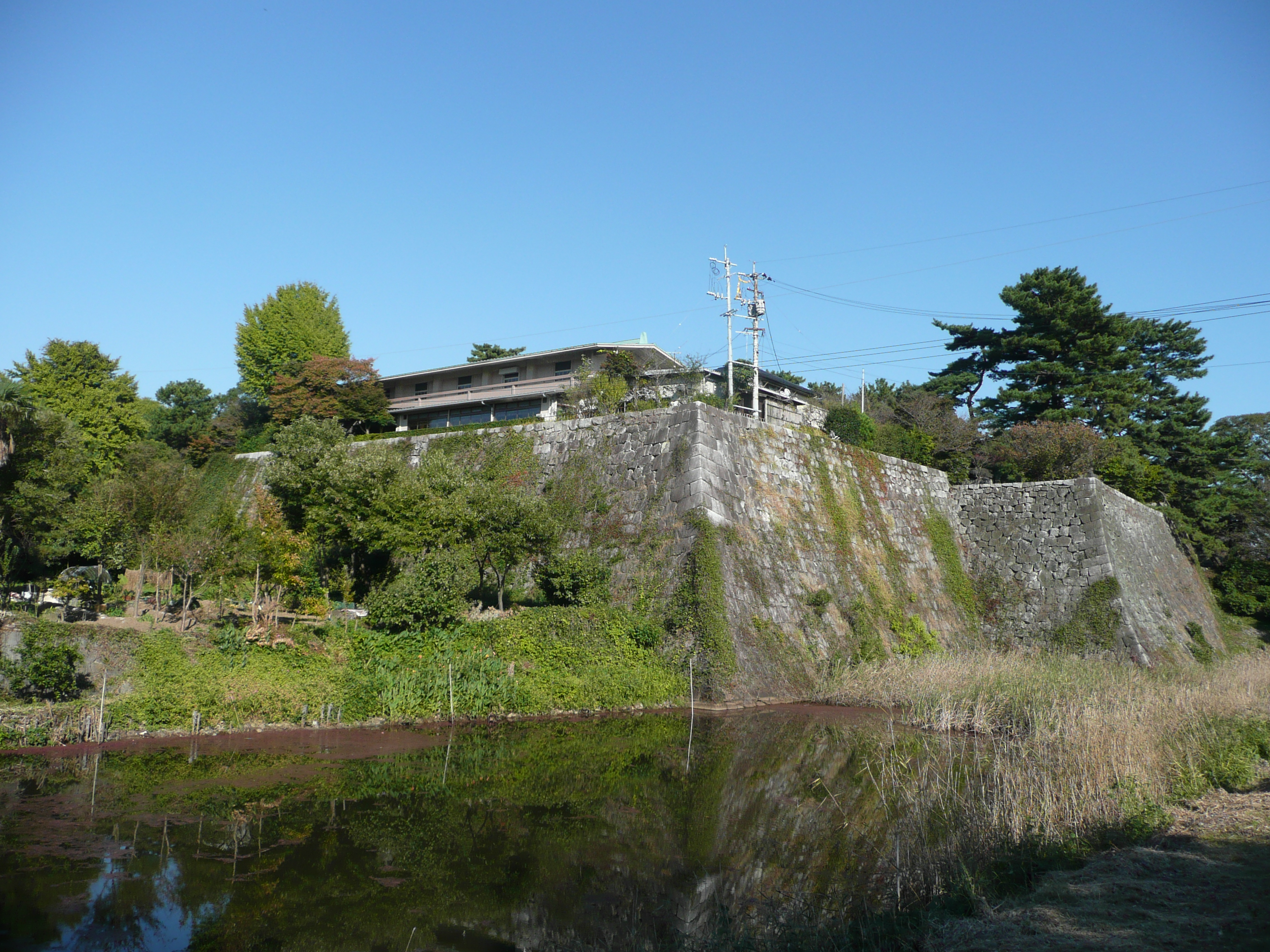
Kurume Castle

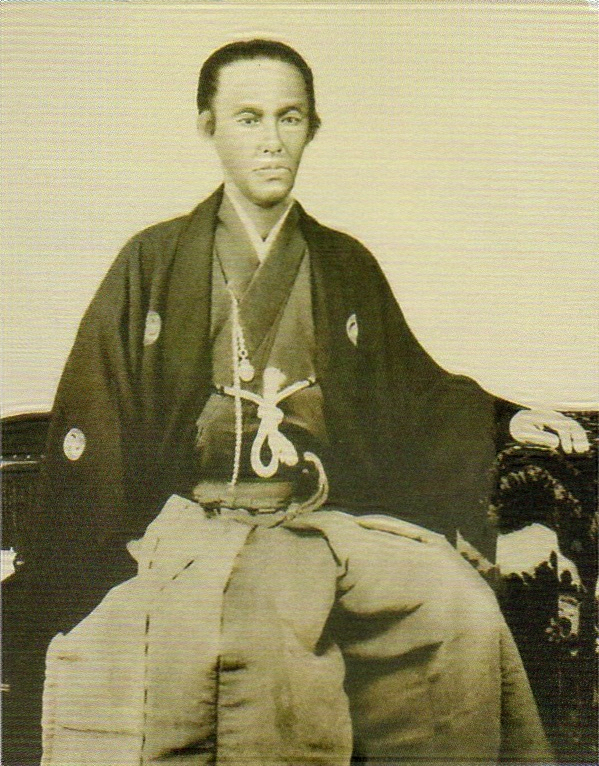
Arima Yorishige, final daimyō of Kurume Domain

== Bibliography ==
- Nussbaum, Louis-Frédéric and Käthe Roth. (2005). Japan encyclopedia. Cambridge: Harvard University Press. ISBN 978-0-674-01753-5; OCLC 58053128
- Papinot, Edmond. (1910). Historical and Geographic Dictionary of Japan. Tokyo: Librarie Sansaisha. OCLC 77691250
- (in Japanese) Kōzuke on "Edo 300 HTML"
