= Yoshino Station (Fukuoka) =

Railway station in Ōmuta, Fukuoka Prefecture, Japan

JB 25 Yoshino Station 吉野駅
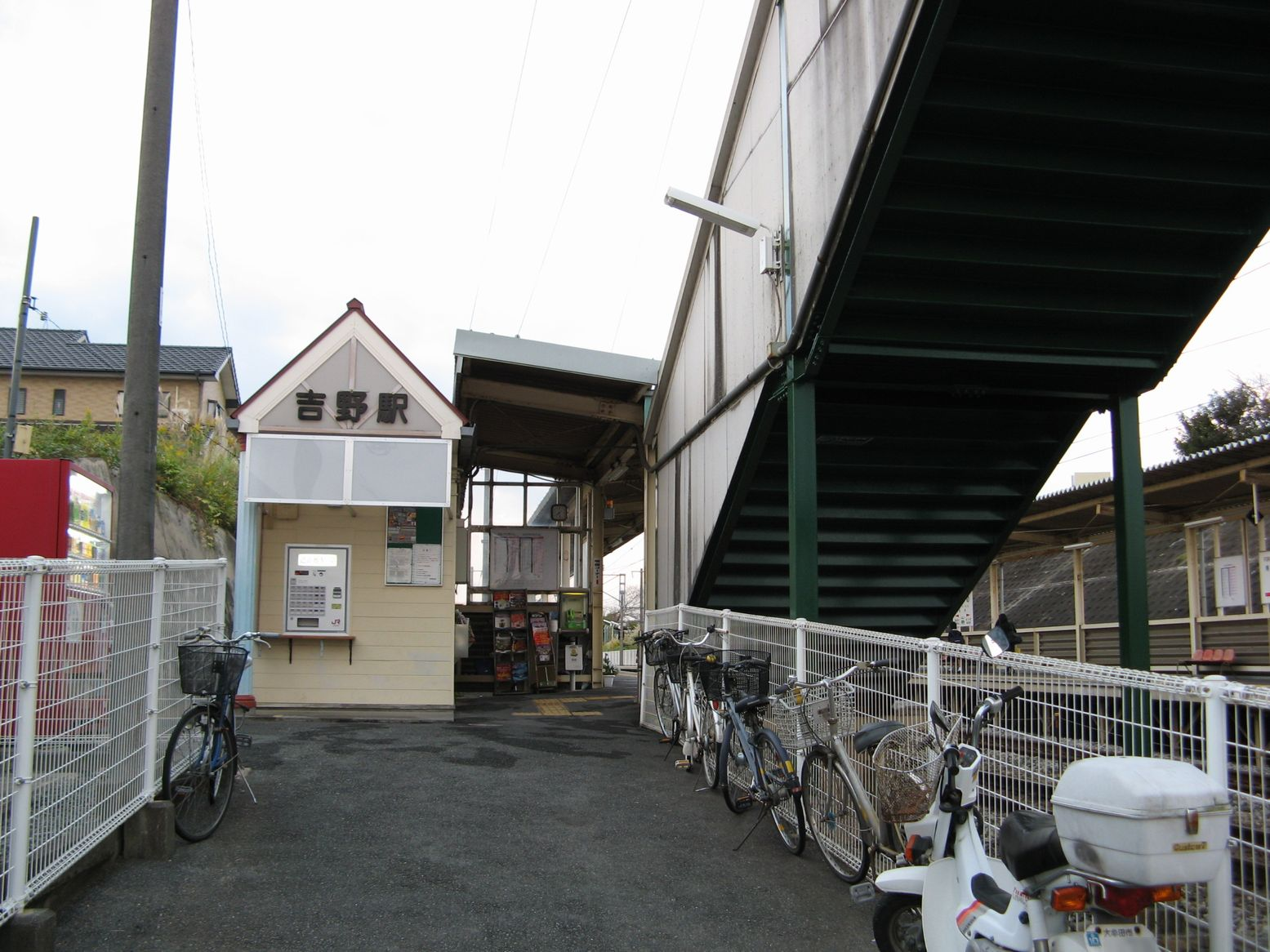
- Yoshino Station in 2007

General information
- Location: Kuranaga, Omuta-shi, Fukuoka-ken 837-0906; Japan
- Coordinates: 33°04′33″N 130°27′59″E
- Operator: JR Kyushu
- Line: JB Kagoshima Main Line
- Distance: 141.9 km from Mojikō
- Platforms: 2 side platforms
- Tracks: 2

Construction
- Structure type: At grade
- Parking: Available
- Accessible: No - platforms linked by footbridge

Other information
- Status: Kan'i itaku ticket window
- Website: Official website

History
- Opened: 16 March 1991

Passengers
- FY2020: 491 daily

Services
Preceding station	JR Kyushu	Following station
Ginsui towards Kagoshima	Kagoshima Main Line	Wataze towards Mojikō
Location
- Location within Fukuoka Prefecture Location within Japan

Yoshino Station (吉野駅, Yoshino-eki) is a passenger railway station located in the city of Ōmuta, Fukuoka Prefecture, Japan. It is operated by JR Kyushu.

== Lines ==
The station is served by the Kagoshima Main Line and is located 141.9 km from the starting point of the line at Mojiko. Only local services on the line stop at the station.

== Layout ==
The station consists of two side platforms serving two tracks. The station building is a small shed which houses a ticket window, an automatic ticket vending machine, a Sugoca charge machine and card reader. There is no waiting room but seats are provided at the shelters on the platforms. Access to the opposite side platform is by means of a footbridge.

Since 2010, the staffing of the ticket window has been entrusted to the Ōmuta Tourist Association. The ticket window is equipped with a POS machine but does not have a Midori no Madoguchi facility.

=== Platforms ===
1	■ JB Kagoshima Main Line	for Ōmuta, Kumamoto and Yatsushiro
2	■ JB Kagoshima Main Line	for Kurume, Tosu and Hakata

== History ==
JR Kyushu opened the station on 16 March 1991 as an additional station on the existing track of the Kagoshima Main Line.

== Passenger statistics ==
In fiscal 2020, the station was used by an average of 393 passengers daily (boarding passengers only), and it ranked 244th among the busiest stations of JR Kyushu.

== Surrounding area ==
- Fukuoka Prefectural Ariake Shinsei High School
- Fukuoka Prefectural Omuta Kita High School
- Meiko Gakuen Junior and Senior High School

== See also ==
- List of railway stations in Japan
