= Miike Domain =

Japanese domain of the Edo period

Miike Domain 三池藩
- Domain of Japan
- 1621–1871
- Mon of the Tachibana clan

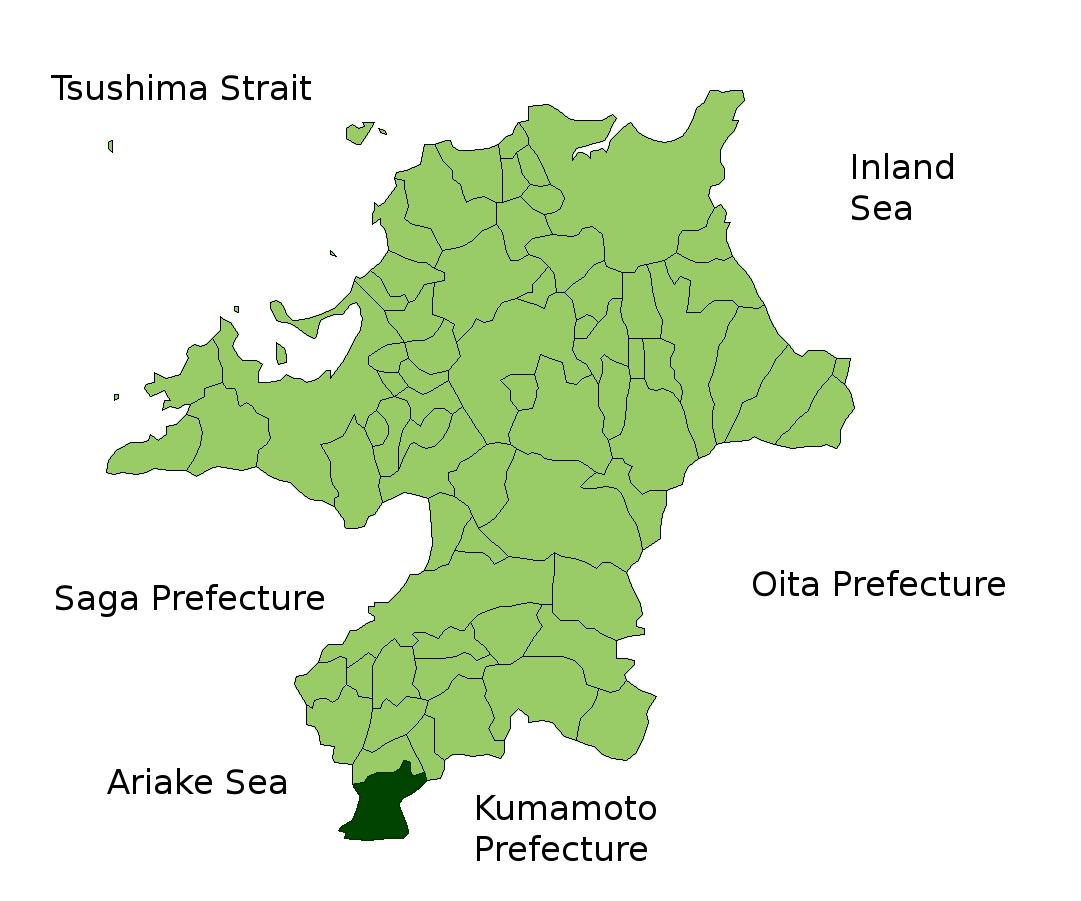
- Location of Miike (now Ōmuta) in Fukuoka Prefecture
- Capital: Miike jin'ya
  - Type: Daimyō
- Historical era: Edo period
  - Established: 1621
  - Disestablished: 1871
- Today part of: Fukuoka Prefecture
- Location of Miike Jin'ya Miike Domain (Japan)

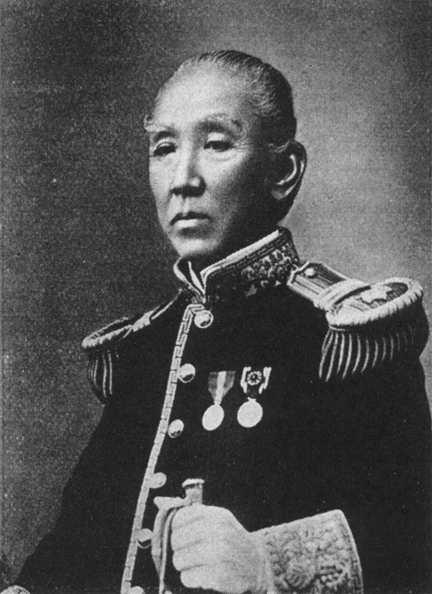
Tachibana Taneyuki, final daimyō of Miike Domain

Miike Domain (三池藩, Miike-han) was a Japanese domain of the Edo period. It was centered around Miike Jin'ya in what is now the city of Ōmuta, Fukuoka and was ruled by the tozama daimyō Tachibana clan for much of its history.

== History ==
Takahashi Naotsugu, the younger brother of Tachibana Muneshige, was awarded a 5,000 koku fief in Tsukuba District, Hitachi Province in 1614 and became a hatamoto. His eldest son, Tachibana Tanetsugu, recovered 5,000 koku of the clan's former territory in Miike District, Chikugo Province, which put him over the threshold to become a daimyō in 1621. This marked the start of Miike Domain.

Coal mining began in 1738, during the era of the 4th daimyō, Tachibana Yasunaga. This industry evolved into the Mitsu-Miike Coal Mine, which remained in operation until 1997. The 6th daimyō, Tachibana Tanechika, served in various positions in the administration of the Tokugawa shogunate, including Ōbangashira, Sōshaban and Jisha-bugyō, eventually becoming a Wakadoshiyori. However, he belonged to the anti-Matsudaira Sadanobu faction and was defeated in a political conflict, and in November 1805, he was dismissed for the charge of leaking secrets by the shogunate, and in December, he was forced to retire and was put under house arrest. HIs successor, Tachibana Taneyoshi, was deprived of Miike Domain in 1806, and was transferred to Shimotedo Domain (下手渡藩) in Mutsu Province in 1806 (currently part of the city of Date, Fukushima). Although his nominal kokudaka remained at 10,000 koku, this was considered as a demotion.

In 1850, Tachibana Taneyoshi's grandson, Taneyuki, managed to trade 5000 koku of his holding for 5000 koku in former Miike Domain. In 1868, during the final years of the Bakumatsu period, he was appointed Gaikoku-bugyō and then a Rōjū; however, by this time the Boshin War had started and after hearing of the defeat of the Shogunate forces at the Battle of Toba-Fushimi, he immediately resigned his positions. He pledged fealty to the Meiji government in Edo, but simultaneously sent the domain's karō, Okuyama Tsuguatsu, to pledge support for the pro-Tokugawa Ōuetsu Reppan Dōmei. When he was discovered that he was playing both sides, the outraged Sendai Domain sent 200 soldiers to burn down the Shimotedo Domain jin'ya and to occupy the territory. Tachibana Taneyuki was forced to move his seat to Miike, although his holdings continued to be divided between Chikugo and Mutsu. In the following year, in 1868, with the establishment of the Meiji government, he was appointed imperial governor of Miike. With the abolition of the feudal domains and establishment of prefectures in 1871, the territory of Miike was incorporated into Fukuoka Prefecture through "Mizuma Prefecture".

Tachibana Taneyuki became a viscount under the kazoku peerage system in 1884.

== Holdings at the end of the Edo period ==
As with most domains in the han system, Miike Domain consisted of several discontinuous territories calculated to provide the assigned kokudaka, based on periodic cadastral surveys and projected agricultural yields.

- Chikugo Province
  - 5 villages in Miike District
  - 71 villages in Miyako District
- Mutsu Province (Iwashiro Province)
  - 7 villages in Date District

== List of daimyo ==
Miike Domain

#	Name	Tenure	Courtesy title	Court Rank	kokudaka
Tachibana clan, 1620–1871 (Tozama daimyo)
1	Tachibana Tanetsugu (立花種継)	1620–1630	Shuzen-no-kami (主膳正)	Junior 5th Rank, Lower Grade (従五位下)	10,000 koku
2	Tachibana Tanenaga (立花種長)	1630–1682	Izumi-no-kami (和泉守)	Junior 5th Rank, Lower Grade (従五位下)	10,000 koku
3	Tachibana Taneakira (立花種明)	1682–1699	Shuzen-no-kami (主膳正)	Junior 5th Rank, Lower Grade (従五位下)	10,000 koku
4	Tachibana Yasunaga (立花貫長)	1699–1747	Izumo-no-kami (出雲守)	Junior 5th Rank, Lower Grade (従五位下)	10,000 koku
5	Tachibana Nagahiro (立花長煕)	1747–1762	Izumi-no-kami (和泉守)	Junior 5th Rank, Lower Grade (従五位下)	10,000 koku
6	Tachibana Tanechika (立花種周)	1762–1805	Izumo-no-kami (出雲守)	Junior 5th Rank, Lower Grade (従五位下)	10,000 koku
7	Tachibana Taneyoshi (立花種善)	1805–1806	Buzen-no-kami (豊前守)	Junior 5th Rank, Lower Grade (従五位下)	10,000 koku

Shimotedo Domain

#	Name	Tenure	Courtesy title	Court Rank	kokudaka
Tachibana clan, 1832–1868 (Tozama daimyo)
1	Tachibana Taneyoshi (立花種善)	1806–1832	Buzen-no-kami (豊前守)	Junior 5th Rank, Lower Grade (従五位下)	10,000 koku
2	Tachibana Taneharu (立花種温)	1832–1849	Shuzen-no-kami (主膳正)	Junior 5th Rank, Lower Grade (従五位下)	10,000 koku
3	Tachibana Taneyuki (立花種恭)	1849–1868	Izumo-no-kami (出雲守)	Junior 5th Rank, Lower Grade (従五位下)	10,000 koku

Miike Domain (restored)

#	Name	Tenure	Courtesy title	Court Rank	kokudaka
Tachibana clan, 1868–1871
1	Tachibana Taneyuki (立花種恭)	1868–1871	Izumo-no-kami (出雲守)	Junior 2nd Rank (従二位)	10,000 koku

== See also ==
- List of Han
- Abolition of the han system
