= Tachibana clan (samurai) =

Samurai clan founded in the 14th century

- The emblem (mon) of the Tachibana clan
- Home province: Chikuzen
- Parent house: Ōtomo clan
- Founder: Tachibana Sadatoshi (Ōtomo Sadatoshi)
- Founding year: 14th century

The Tachibana clan (立花氏) was a Japanese clan of daimyō (feudal lords) during Japan's Sengoku and Edo periods. Originally based in Tachibana castle in Kyūshū, the family's holdings were moved to the Yanagawa Domain in the far north-east of Honshū in the Edo period.

The clan, which bore no direct relation to the Tachibana clan of the Heian period, originated with Ōtomo Sadatoshi (d. 1336), who took on the name and assigned it to the family of Ōtomo vassals who held Tachibana castle. For a time, the Tachibana served as loyal retainers under the Ōtomo clan, regularly battling the Shimazu, rivals to the Ōtomo. In the mid-16th century, Ōtomo Sōrin installed Bekki Akitsura (also romanized Totsugi Akitsura) of the Bekki clan (戸次氏) as head of Tachibana castle, and he took the name Tachibana Dōsetsu.

Dōsetsu had no sons, and nominated his daughter, Tachibana Ginchiyo, to succeed him. Shortly afterwards, she would marry Takahashi Munetora, a vassal of Toyotomi Hideyoshi, who helped defeat the Shimazu in Hideyoshi's Kyūshū Campaign. Upon inheriting the clan leadership, Takahashi took a new name, and became known as Tachibana Muneshige.

Muneshige then fought for Hideyoshi in the Japanese invasions of Korea (1592–98), and was granted the han (fief) of Yanagawa (Chikugo Province, 132,000 koku), the land surrounding Tachibana castle. Muneshige and Ginchiyo fought against the Tokugawa, however, during the decisive Battle of Sekigahara of 1600, and was dispossessed of his holdings when the Tokugawa shogunate was established.

Ultimately, he proved his loyalty to the shogunate in 1611, and was granted a fief in Mutsu Province, far from Kyūshū. This fief, the Tanakura Domain, was only worth 20,000 koku, but when the Tanaka family holding Tachibana castle and Yanagawa died out, due to a lack of heirs, the Tachibana were restored to their old territory. Their income remained around 20,000 koku, however. Holding onto this fief continuously through the rest of the Edo period, the Tachibana were granted the title of Hakushaku (Count) during the Meiji period, when the feudal system and samurai class were abolished.

Meanwhile, Muneshige's younger brother, Takahashi Munemasu (1573–1617), fell into much the same situation. His domain was reduced from 18,000 koku to 5000 as a result of his opposition to the Tokugawa at Sekigahara. He changed his name to Tachibana Naotsugu, and passed on the Miike Domain to his heirs. Tachibana Takachika, one of that line, was awarded the government post of wakadoshiyori, gaining power and prestige for the clan even though he was soon demoted to hatamoto. This branch of the family was granted the title of Viscount following the Meiji Restoration.

== Significant members of the Tachibana family ==
- Ōtomo Sadatoshi
- Tachibana Shinsei
- Tachibana Munekatsu
- Tachibana Shinzen
- Tachibana Dōsetsu (1513–1585)
- Tachibana Ginchiyo (1569–1602)
- Tachibana Muneshige (1567–1642)
- Tachibana Naotsugu (1573–1617)
- Tachibana Takachika
