= 100 Terraced Rice Fields of Japan =

Government initiative

This list of the 100 Terraced Rice Fields of Japan (日本の棚田百選, Nihon no tanada hyakusen) is an initiative by the Ministry of Agriculture, Forestry and Fisheries to promote the maintenance and preservation of the terraces alongside public interest in agriculture and rural areas. In 1999, some 134 terraces were selected by a committee of academics from nominations by each prefecture, in 117 municipalities from Tōhoku to Kyūshū.

== Terraces ==
Terrace	Prefecture	Municipality	Image	Coordinates	Area (ha)	Average Gradient	No. of Paddies	Development	Ref
Yamabuki 山吹	Iwate	Ichinoseki		39°01′37″N 141°23′23″E	5.0	1 in 6	50	Heian to Muromachi period; since 1946	
Sawajiri 沢尻	Miyagi	Marumori		37°56′47″N 140°42′03″E	4.1	1 in 8	56	Sengoku to Edo period; since 1946	
Nishiyama 西山	Miyagi	Kurihara		38°51′41″N 140°56′08″E	2.0	1 in 11	30	Meiji period onwards	
Kunugidaira 椹平	Yamagata	Asahi		38°18′52″N 140°08′31″E	10.5	1 in 20	208	since 1946	
Ōwarabi 大蕨	Yamagata	Yamanobe		38°17′11″N 140°11′59″E	3.4	1 in 7	27	Meiji to 1945	
Shikamura 四ヶ村	Yamagata	Ōkura		38°36′49″N 140°12′47″E	12.5	1 in 20	135	Meiji to early Shōwa	
Ishibatake 石畑	Tochigi	Motegi		36°35′30″N 140°12′17″E	2.4	1 in 8	180	unknown	
Kunimi 国見	Tochigi	Nasukarasuyama		36°36′04″N 140°11′27″E	2.1	1 in 11	50	Meiji to 1945	
Ōyama-senmaida 大山千枚田	Chiba	Kamogawa		35°07′50″N 139°58′27″E	3.1	1 in 5	375	Medieval	
Kamufinakura 上船倉の棚田	Niigata	Jōetsu		37°04′31″N 138°29′46″E	29	1 in 10	410	since 1946	
Kitsunezuka 狐塚の棚田	Niigata	Tōkamachi		37°02′41″N 138°35′04″E	19	1 in 5	84	Sengoku to Edo period; 1982 to 1987	
Hasuno 蓮野の棚田	Niigata	Jōetsu		37°07′25″N 138°30′18″E	30.6	1 in 6	28	since 1946	
Hananosaka 花坂の棚田	Niigata	Kashiwazaki		37°11′20″N 138°34′03″E	8.8	1 in 15	46	Meiji to 1945	
Nashinokida 梨ノ木田の棚田	Niigata	Kashiwazaki		37°12′46″N 138°37′44″E	2.8	1 in 8	47	Sengoku to Edo period; 1998	
Ōbiraki 大開の棚田	Niigata	Kashiwazaki		37°11′20″N 138°34′03″E	12.0	1 in 6	52	Meiji to 1945	
Kitaimogawa 北五百川の棚田	Niigata	Sanjō		37°32′38″N 139°07′47″E	9.5	1 in 20	280	unknown	
Nagasaka 長坂	Toyama	Himi		36°56′50″N 136°59′24″E	10.5	1 in 10	150	Sengoku to Edo period	
Minori 三乗	Toyama	Toyama		36°34′19″N 137°07′20″E	14.8	1 in 20	95	from the Meiji period	
Okuyamada 奥山田	Ishikawa	Tsubata		36°39′28″N 136°43′46″E	1.7	1 in 20	15	Meiji period to 1945	
Ōsasanami-suiden 大笹波水田	Ishikawa	Shika		37°12′04″N 136°41′08″E	1.15	1 in 20	180	Meiji period to 1945	
Shirayone-senmaida 白米の千枚田	Ishikawa	Wajima		37°25′32″N 136°59′58″E	1.2	1 in 3	2092	Sengoku to Edo period	
Nashigadaira-senmaida 梨ヶ平地区千枚田	Fukui	Echizen		35°59′18″N 135°58′09″E	3.5	1 in 3	300	Sengoku to Edo period	
Hibiki 日引	Fukui	Takahama		35°32′30″N 135°28′19″E	3.36	1 in 5	204	Sengoku to Edo period	
Utsuboiri 宇坪入	Nagano	Komoro		36°21′36″N 138°26′19″E	8.0	1 in 10	180	Sengoku to Edo period	
Inakura 稲倉	Nagano	Ueda		36°24′21″N 138°19′03″E	8.4	1 in 9	87	Sengoku to Edo period	
Himegozawa 姫子沢	Nagano	Tomi		36°23′19″N 138°20′52″E	14.0	1 in 9	153	Sengoku to Edo period	
Takinosawa 滝の沢	Nagano	Tomi		36°22′53″N 138°22′24″E	8.0	1 in 8	75	Sengoku to Edo period	
Yokonetanbo よこね田んぼ	Nagano	Iida		35°25′41″N 137°52′21″E	3.0	1 in 4.3	110	Sengoku to Edo period	
Jūtarō 重太郎	Nagano	Ōmachi		36°29′32″N 137°54′16″E	3.8	1 in 4	52	Sengoku to Edo period	
Aoni 青鬼	Nagano	Hakuba		36°43′11″N 137°53′49″E	4.2	1 in 15	80	Edo period	
Keishioki 慶師沖	Nagano	Nagano		36°31′07″N 138°00′07″E	2.0	1 in 10	25	Meiji to 1945	
Negoshioki 根越沖	Nagano	Nagano		36°30′16″N 137°58′35″E	3.0	1 in 15	50	Meiji to 1945	
Haradaoki 原田沖	Nagano	Nagano		36°28′50″N 137°58′51″E	1.5	1 in 10	25	Meiji to 1945	
Obasute 姨捨	Nagano	Chikuma		36°30′13″N 138°05′54″E	25	1 in 7	2000	Sengoku to Edo period	
Shiomoto 塩本	Nagano	Nagano		36°33′28″N 138°00′43″E	6.0	1 in 8	259	modern	
Tochikura 栃倉	Nagano	Nagano		36°36′32″N 138°02′06″E	6.2	1 in 5	42	since 1946	
Ōnishi 大西	Nagano	Nagano		36°36′32″N 138°02′06″E	4.0	1 in 8	45	Meiji to 1945	
Tazawaoki 田沢沖	Nagano	Nagano		36°36′32″N 138°02′06″E	1.1	1 in 8	18	since 1946	
Fukushima-shinden 福島新田	Nagano	Iiyama		36°53′02″N 138°25′58″E	10.0	1 in 12	150	Edo period	
Shōgahora 正ヶ洞	Gifu	Gujō		35°56′29″N 136°49′48″E	2.7	1 in 6	24	Sengoku to Edo period	
Kamidaida 上代田	Gifu	Yaotsu		35°30′27″N 137°08′44″E	5.0	1 in 6	123	unknown	
Sakaori 坂折	Gifu	Ena		35°31′04″N 137°17′13″E	14.0	1 in 7	468	Sengoku to Edo period	
Tadokoro-ke 田頃家	Gifu	Takayama		36°13′26″N 137°31′55″E	1.2	1 in 7	47	Meiji to 1945	
Nakaida ナカイ田	Gifu	Takayama		36°01′33″N 137°18′18″E	2.1	1 in 7	43	unknown	
Kurumeki 久留女木の棚田	Shizuoka	Hamamatsu		34°54′04″N 137°42′11″E	7.7	1 in 5.7	800	Heian to Muromachi period	
Ōguriyasu 大栗安の棚田	Shizuoka	Hamamatsu		34°56′47″N 137°44′19″E	8.6	1 in 3	481	Sengoku to Edo period	
Arahara 荒原の棚田	Shizuoka	Izu		34°53′30″N 138°56′38″E	2.0	1 in 10	25	Sengoku to Edo period	
Shitanodan 下ノ段の棚田	Shizuoka	Izu		34°53′09″N 138°53′56″E	1.5	1 in 6	40	Sengoku to Edo period	
Kitayama 北山の棚田	Shizuoka	Numazu		34°58′06″N 138°48′45″E	1.52	1 in 7	20	Sengoku to Edo period	
Yotsuya-senmaida 四谷千枚田	Aichi	Shinshiro		35°02′54″N 137°33′58″E	7.4	1 in 4	852	Heian to Muromachi period	
Nagae 長江の棚田	Aichi	Shitara		35°06′37″N 137°35′23″E	3.4	1 in 8	90	Meiji to 1945	
Maruyama-senmaida 丸山千枚田	Mie	Kumano		33°52′27″N 135°57′15″E	7.2	1 in 4	1340	Sengoku to Edo period	
Fukano-no-Dandanta 深野のだんだん田	Mie	Matsusaka		34°29′18″N 136°24′09″E	4.7	1 in 15	550	Meiji to 1945	
Sakamoto 坂本	Mie	Kameyama		34°55′34″N 136°24′41″E	12	1 in 10	130	Sengoku to Edo period	
Hata 畑の棚田	Shiga	Takashima		35°17′42″N 135°55′45″E	15.4	1 in 6	359	Heian to Muromachi period	
Kehara 毛原	Kyōto	Fukuchiyama		35°26′50″N 135°09′43″E	5.0	1 in 10	600	Sengoku to Edo period	
Sodeshi 袖志	Kyōto	Kyōtango		35°45′45″N 135°12′30″E	11.8	1 in 10	400	Sengoku to Edo period	
Shimo-Akasaka 下赤阪の棚田	Ōsaka	Chihayaakasaka		34°27′32″N 135°37′06″E	7.4	1 in 6	250	Muromachi period	
Nagatani 長谷の棚田	Ōsaka	Nose		34°58′00″N 135°22′15″E	5.9	1 in 5	200	Meiji period to 1945	
Isarigami 岩座神	Hyōgo	Taka		35°07′29″N 134°53′13″E	11.8	1 in 6	344	Sengoku to Edo period	
Otsuōkidani 乙大木谷	Hyōgo	Sayō		35°02′00″N 134°19′39″E	23	1 in 20	988	Heian to Muromachi period	
Ueyama うへ山	Hyōgo	Kami		35°26′29″N 134°31′37″E	3.1	1 in 5	39	unknown	
Nishigaoka 西ヶ岡	Hyōgo	Kami		35°30′12″N 134°34′53″E	6.9	1 in 2.8	126	Heian to Muromachi period	
Kannabi-no-Sato (Inabuchi) 神奈備の郷(稲淵)	Nara	Asuka		34°27′25″N 135°49′10″E	21.5	1 in 4	315	Heian to Muromachi period	
Aragijima 蘭島	Wakayama	Aridagawa		34°05′32″N 135°25′15″E	2.34	1 in 12.4	54	Sengoku to Edo period	
Yokoo 横尾	Tottori	Iwami		35°30′33″N 134°24′07″E	25	1 in 16	500	Sengoku to Edo period	
Tsukuyone 舂米	Tottori	Wakasa		35°21′23″N 134°29′25″E	4.36	1 in 5	100	Sengoku to Edo period	
Nakagaachi 中垣内	Shimane	Masuda		34°38′54″N 131°44′16″E	6.2	1 in 4	376	Heian to Muromachi period	
Sannōji 山王寺	Shimane	Unnan		35°21′29″N 133°00′19″E	19	1 in 8	200	Sengoku to Edo period	
Ōhara-shinden 大原新田	Shimane	Okuizumo		35°07′32″N 133°04′21″E	4.9	1 in 8	38	Heian to Muromachi period	
Kandani 神谷	Shimane	Ōnan		34°52′55″N 132°40′25″E	12	1 in 10	128	Sengoku to Edo period	
Tsukawa 都川	Shimane	Hamada		34°47′36″N 132°17′21″E	6.7	1 in 10	200	Heian to Muromachi period	
Murodani 室谷	Shimane	Hamada		34°48′47″N 132°01′02″E	28	1 in 10	4000	Heian to Muromachi period	
Ōidani 大井谷	Shimane	Yoshika		34°27′46″N 131°50′52″E	8.2	1 in 6	639	Sengoku to Edo period	
Kitashō 北庄	Okayama	Kumenan		34°27′46″N 131°50′52″E	88	1 in 7.5	2700	Meiji to 1945	
Kamimomi 上籾	Okayama	Kumenan		34°27′46″N 131°50′52″E	22	1 in 7	1000	Meiji to 1945	
Koyama 小山	Okayama	Misaki		34°58′46″N 133°52′34″E	5.5	1 in 10	30	Meiji to 1945	
Ōhaga-nishi 大垪和西棚田	Okayama	Misaki		34°58′46″N 133°52′34″E	42.2	1 in 5	850	Meiji to 1945	
Ini 井仁	Hiroshima	Akiōta		34°58′46″N 133°52′34″E	10.1	1 in 6	324	Medieval, modern	
Higashi-Ushiro-bata 東後畑	Yamaguchi	Nagato		34°24′27″N 131°03′48″E	7	1 in 15	210	Sengoku to Edo period	
Kashihara 樫原の棚田	Tokushima	Kamikatsu		33°53′10″N 134°22′44″E	5.5	1 in 3.7	546	Heian to Muromachi period	
Shimokage 下影	Tokushima	Miyoshi		33°59′25″N 133°52′04″E	1.1	1 in 4	30	Meiji to 1945	
Nakayama-senmaida 中山千枚田	Kagawa	Shōdoshima		34°30′15″N 134°14′22″E	12.4	1 in 5	888	Medieval, modern	
Izumitani 泉谷	Ehime	Uchiko		33°30′57″N 132°42′55″E	4.0	1 in 3	95	Meiji to 1945	
Dōnosako 堂の坂	Ehime	Seiyo		33°22′31″N 132°41′27″E	1.5	1 in 5	100	Heian to Muromachi period	
Okuuchi 奥内	Ehime	Matsuno		33°14′58″N 132°44′39″E	20	1 in 7	600	ancient	
Senmaida 千枚田	Kōchi	Yusuhara		33°23′23″N 132°57′19″E	2.5	1 in 10	250	Heian to Muromachi period	
Hirouchi-Uebaru 広内・上原地区棚田	Fukuoka	Yame		33°16′00″N 130°44′52″E	5.9	1 in 3.6	200	Sengoku to Edo period	
Tsuzura 葛籠棚田	Fukuoka	Ukiha		33°16′07″N 130°49′29″E	6	1 in 6.7	300	Sengoku to Edo period	
Shirakawa 白川	Fukuoka	Asakura		33°29′38″N 130°40′14″E	2.3	1 in 8	40	unknown	
Take 竹	Fukuoka	Tōhō		33°26′11″N 130°52′31″E	13	1 in 10	400	Sengoku to Edo period	
Warabino 蕨野の棚田	Saga	Karatsu		33°17′36″N 130°02′08″E	40	1 in 4	1050	Sengoku to Edo period	
Ōura 大浦の棚田	Saga	Karatsu		33°24′59″N 129°51′55″E	35.4	1 in 5	1096	Heian to Muromachi period	
Hamanoura 浜野浦の棚田	Saga	Genkai		33°29′21″N 129°50′50″E	11.5	1 in 7	283	Sengoku to Edo period	
Take 岳の棚田	Saga	Arita		33°13′39″N 129°49′12″E	28.6	1 in 5	570	Sengoku to Edo period	
Eriyama 江里山の棚田	Saga	Ogi		33°19′35″N 130°11′37″E	16.4	1 in 5	592	Heian to Muromachi period	
Nishinotani 西の谷の棚田	Saga	Saga		33°24′46″N 130°11′17″E	5	1 in 10.3	74	unknown	
Oniki 鬼木棚田	Nagasaki	Hasami		33°07′08″N 129°55′03″E	50	1 in 6	700	Heian to Muromachi period	
Doya 土谷棚田	Nagasaki	Matsuura		33°23′05″N 129°48′59″E	10	1 in 4	400	Meiji to 1945	
Hinata 日向の棚田	Nagasaki	Kawatana		33°05′56″N 129°54′49″E	6	1 in 15	80	Meiji to 1945	
Ōnakao 大中尾棚田	Nagasaki	Nagasaki		32°53′00″N 129°41′47″E	6.5	1 in 20	300	Sengoku to Edo period	
Tanimizu 谷水	Nagasaki	Minamishimabara		32°38′01″N 130°13′20″E	4.5	1 in 5	230	Meiji to 1945	
Shimizu 清水棚田	Nagasaki	Unzen		32°49′07″N 130°09′12″E	10	1 in 5	260	Meiji to 1945	
Ōgi 扇棚田	Kumamoto	Ubuyama		33°02′25″N 131°12′23″E	2.1	1 in 10	17	Sengoku to Edo period	
Nichikō 日光の棚田	Kumamoto	Yatsushiro		32°26′35″N 130°42′37″E	2	1 in 5	232	Sengoku to Edo period	
Tenjinkoba 天神木場の棚田	Kumamoto	Yatsushiro		32°30′56″N 130°42′03″E	2	1 in 5	60	Sengoku to Edo period	
Bishō 美生の棚田	Kumamoto	Yatsushiro		32°30′56″N 130°44′05″E	1.3	1 in 10	52	Sengoku to Edo period	
Ōsakuyama-senmaida 大作山の千枚田	Kumamoto	Kamiamakusa		32°24′17″N 130°22′18″E	13	1 in 7	110	Hiean to Muromachi period	
Seishukassō 静趣活創棚田・番所	Kumamoto	Yamaga		33°05′23″N 130°48′06″E	1.1	1 in 6.6	80	Meiji to 1945	
Oninokuchi 鬼の口棚田	Kumamoto	Kuma		32°14′14″N 130°38′45″E	2	1 in 5	80	unknown	
Matsutani 松谷棚田	Kumamoto	Kuma		32°13′45″N 130°39′55″E	4	1 in 4	60	unknown	
Samukawa 寒川地区棚田	Kumamoto	Minamata		32°10′29″N 130°32′15″E	10	1 in 6	469	Meiji to 1945	
Mine 峰棚田	Kumamoto	Yamato		32°42′57″N 130°54′41″E	12.2	1 in 20	215	Sengoku to Edo period	
Sugesakoda 菅迫田	Kumamoto	Yamato		32°39′01″N 131°01′52″E	40.8	1 in 15	517	Sengoku to Edo period	
Yufugawa-Okuzume 由布川奥詰	Ōita	Yufu			4.5	1 in 4	87	Sengoku to Edo period	
Uchinari 内成棚田	Ōita	Beppu		33°14′06″N 131°28′44″E	41.7	1 in 10.4	1000	Sengoku to Edo period	
Jikumaru 軸丸	Ōita	Bungo-ōno		32°59′05″N 131°27′14″E	51.6	1 in 10.5	1100	Sengoku to Edo period	
Yamaurasōzu 山浦早水	Ōita	Kusu			6.0	1 in 5	120	Meiji to 1945	
Ryōai 両合棚田	Ōita	Usa		33°21′49″N 131°18′45″E	7.0	1 in 5	147	Sengoku to Edo period	
Hadaka 羽高棚田	Ōita	Nakatsu			4.9	1 in 10	70	Sengoku to Edo period	
Masaki 真幸棚田	Miyazaki	Ebino		32°04′35″N 130°43′40″E	0.8	1 in 8.5	33	since 1946	
Otonokuchi (Kamigami-no-Sato) 尾戸の口(神々の里）	Miyazaki	Takachiho		32°42′28″N 131°20′33″E	16.4	1 in 10	780	Meiji to 1945	
Tochimata 栃又	Miyazaki	Takachiho		32°42′48″N 131°20′10″E	24.5	1 in 10	748	Meiji to 1945	
Tokubettō 徳別当	Miyazaki	Takachiho		32°41′34″N 131°16′49″E	25.4	1 in 12	720	since 1946	
Ishigaki-no-Mura 石垣の村	Miyazaki	Hinokage		32°42′00″N 131°24′09″E	6	1 in 4	178	Meiji to 1945	
Tori-no-Su 鳥の巣	Miyazaki	Gokase		32°41′07″N 131°11′52″E	2.14	1 in 12	49	Meiji to 1945	
Shimonoharu 下の原	Miyazaki	Gokase		32°37′28″N 131°14′36″E	5.7	1 in 15	105	Meiji to 1945	
Hizoe 日蔭	Miyazaki	Gokase		32°38′48″N 131°10′40″E	7.5	1 in 18		Meiji to 1945	
Sakamoto 坂元棚田	Miyazaki	Nichinan		31°39′23″N 131°15′34″E	3.5	1 in 5.7	120	Meiji to 1945	
Mukae 向江棚田	Miyazaki	Nishimera		32°15′55″N 131°07′57″E	3.2	1 in 6	61	Nara period	
Harunohira 春の平棚田	Miyazaki	Nishimera		32°14′19″N 131°09′02″E	3.6	1 in 10	67	Meiji to 1945	
Uchinoo 内之尾	Kagoshima	Satsumasendai		31°45′26″N 130°27′39″E	10.9	1 in 6	75	Sengoku to Edo period	
Kōda 幸田	Kagoshima	Yūsui		31°55′47″N 130°39′14″E	10	1 in 16	102	Sengoku to Edo period	
Tsukuda 佃	Kagoshima	Minamikyūshū		31°16′17″N 130°29′29″E	24	1 in 1	127	from 1993	

== See also ==
- 100 Fishing Village Heritage Sites (Japan)
- 100 Soundscapes of Japan
- Rice
