= Morotsuka, Miyazaki =

Morotsuka 諸塚村
- Village
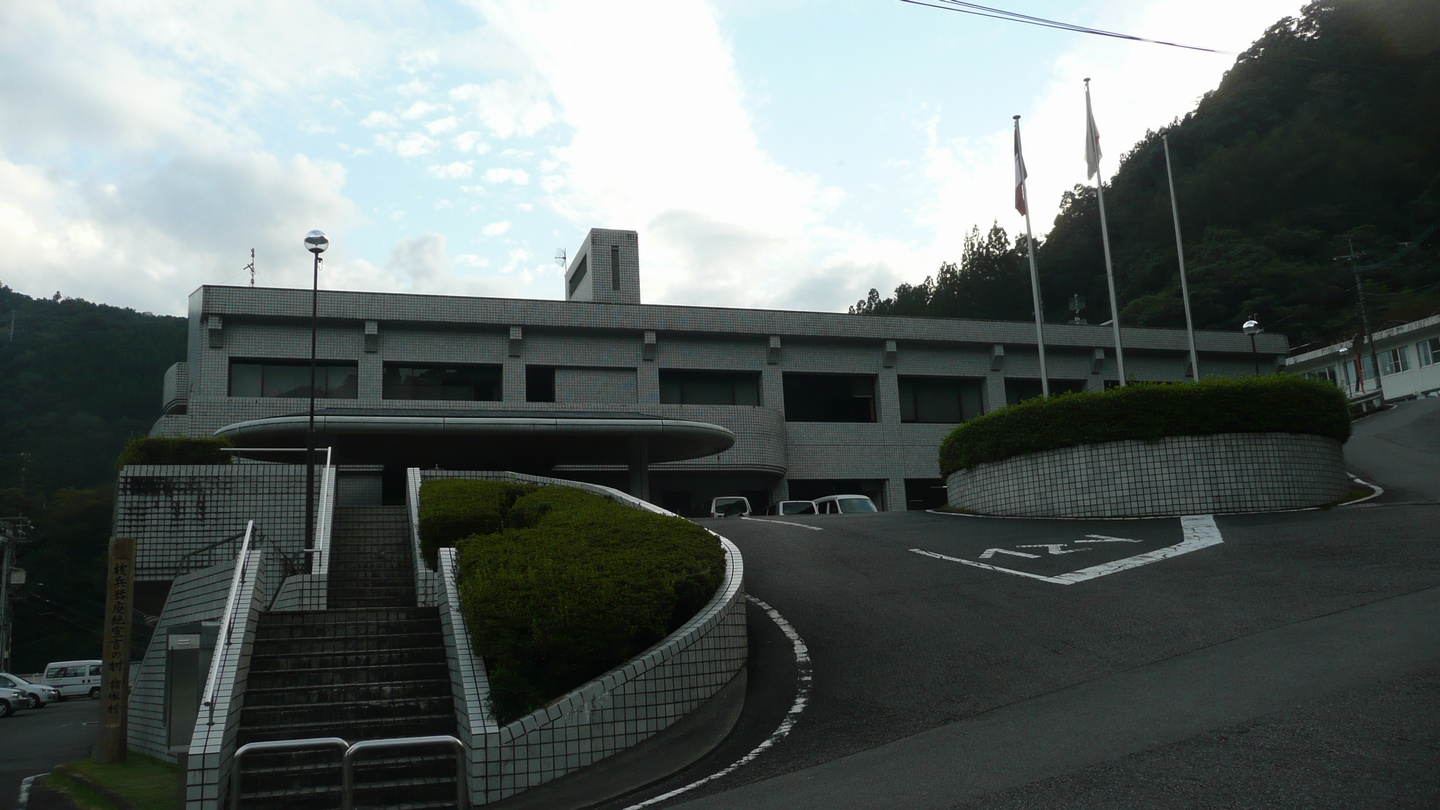
- Morotsuka Village Hall

- Flag Chapter
- Location of Morotsuka in Miyazaki Prefecture

- Location in Japan
- Coordinates: 32°30′44″N 131°19′49″E
- Country: Japan
- Region: Kyushu
- Prefecture: Miyazaki
- District: Higashiusuki

Area
  - Total: 187.56 km^{2} (72.42 sq mi)

Population (October 1, 2023)
  - Total: 1,360
  - Density: 7.25/km^{2} (18.8/sq mi)
- Time zone: UTC+09:00 (JST)
- City hall address: 2683 Iashiro, Morotsuka-son, Higashiusuki-gun, Miyazaki-ken 883-1301
- Website: Official website
- Symbols
- Bird: Japanese white-eye
- Flower: Mountain cherry
- Tree: Sawtooth oak

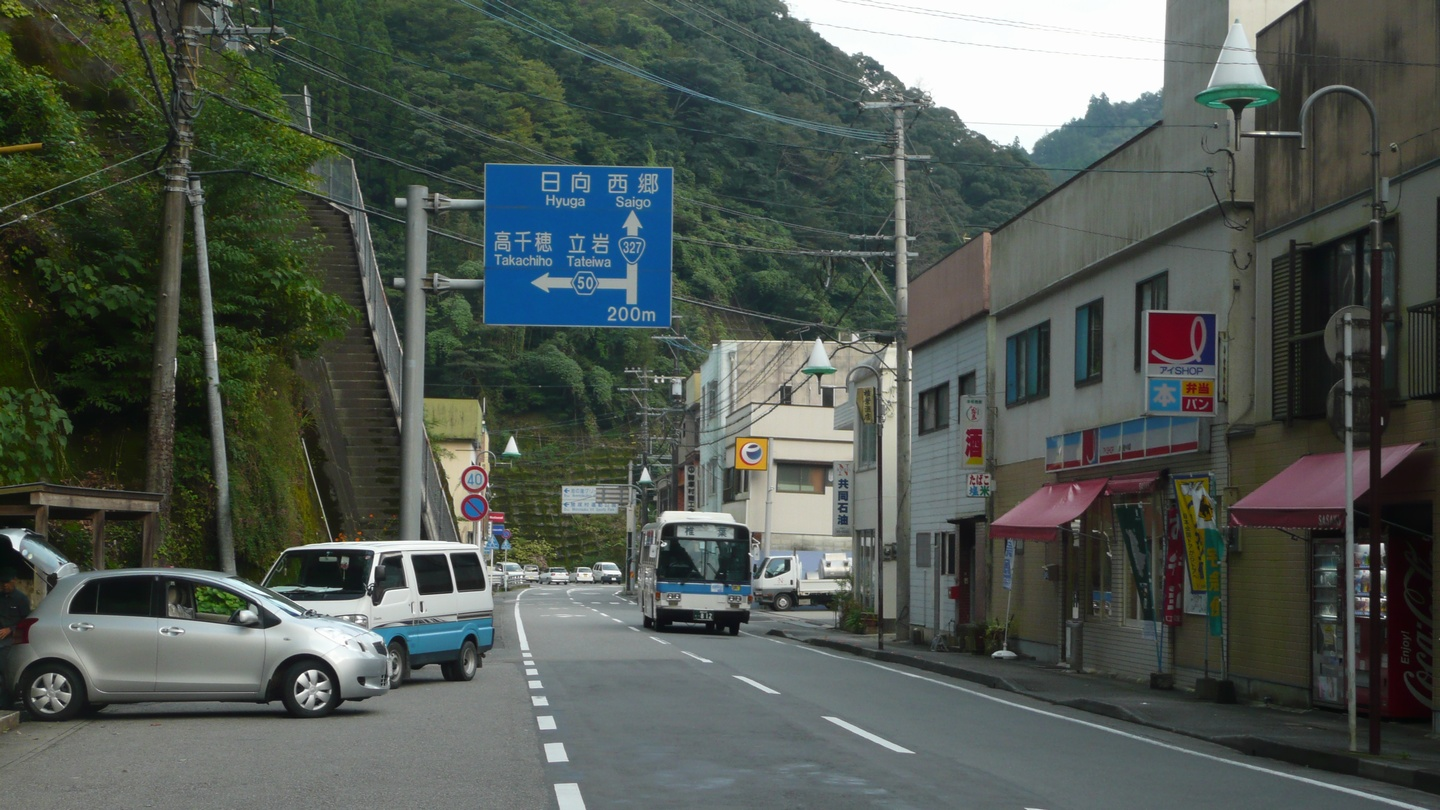
Route 327 in Morotsuka

Morotsuka (諸塚村, Morotsuka-son) is a village in Higashiusuki District, Miyazaki Prefecture, Japan. As of 1 October 2023, the village has an estimated population of 1360 in 601 households, and a population density of 9.8 persons per km². The total area of the village is 187.56 square kilometres (72.42 sq mi).

== Geography ==
Morotsuka is located in northern Miyazaki Prefecture in the steep Kyushu Mountains. Approximately 90% of the village area is forest. Morotsuka has a humid subtropical climate (Köppen Cfa) characterized by warm summers and cool winters with light to no snowfall.

=== Neighbouring municipalities ===
Miyazaki Prefecture

- Gokase
- Hinokage
- Misato
- Shiiba
- Takachiho

== Demographics ==
Per Japanese census data, the population of Morotsuka has declined in recent decades.

Historical population
Year	Pop.	±%
1920	5,327	—
1930	5,780	+8.5%
1940	6,018	+4.1%
1950	6,336	+5.3%
1960	8,048	+27.0%
1970	4,582	−43.1%
1980	3,470	−24.3%
1990	2,917	−15.9%
2000	2,402	−17.7%
2010	1,882	−21.6%
2020	1,486	−21.0%
Morotsuka population statistics

== History ==
The area of Morotsuka was part of ancient Hyūga Province. During the Edo period, it was part of the holdings of Nobeoka Domain. The village of Morotsuka was established on April 1, 1889 within Nishiusuki District, Miyazaki with the creation of the modern municipalities system. The village was transferred to Higashiusuki District, Miyazaki in 1949.

== Government ==
Morotsuka has a mayor-council form of government with a directly elected mayor and a unicameral village council of eight members. Morotsuka, collectively with the village of Shiiba and towns of Misato and Kadogawa contributes one member to the Miyazaki Prefectural Assembly. In terms of national politics, the village is part of the Miyazaki 2nd district of the lower house of the Diet of Japan.

== Economy ==
Forestry and agriculture are the main industries, with the village noted for producing shiitake mushrooms, tea and miso.

== Education ==
Morotsuka has three public elementary schools and one public junior high school. The village does not have a high school.

== Transportation ==
The roads of Morotsuka were severely damaged by Typhoon Nanmadol in 2022.

=== Railways ===
Morotsuka has no passenger rail service. The nearest train station is Hyūgashi on the JR Kyushu Nippō Main Line

=== Highways ===
- National Route 327
- National Route 503
