= Kadogawa, Miyazaki =

Kadogawa 門川町
- Town
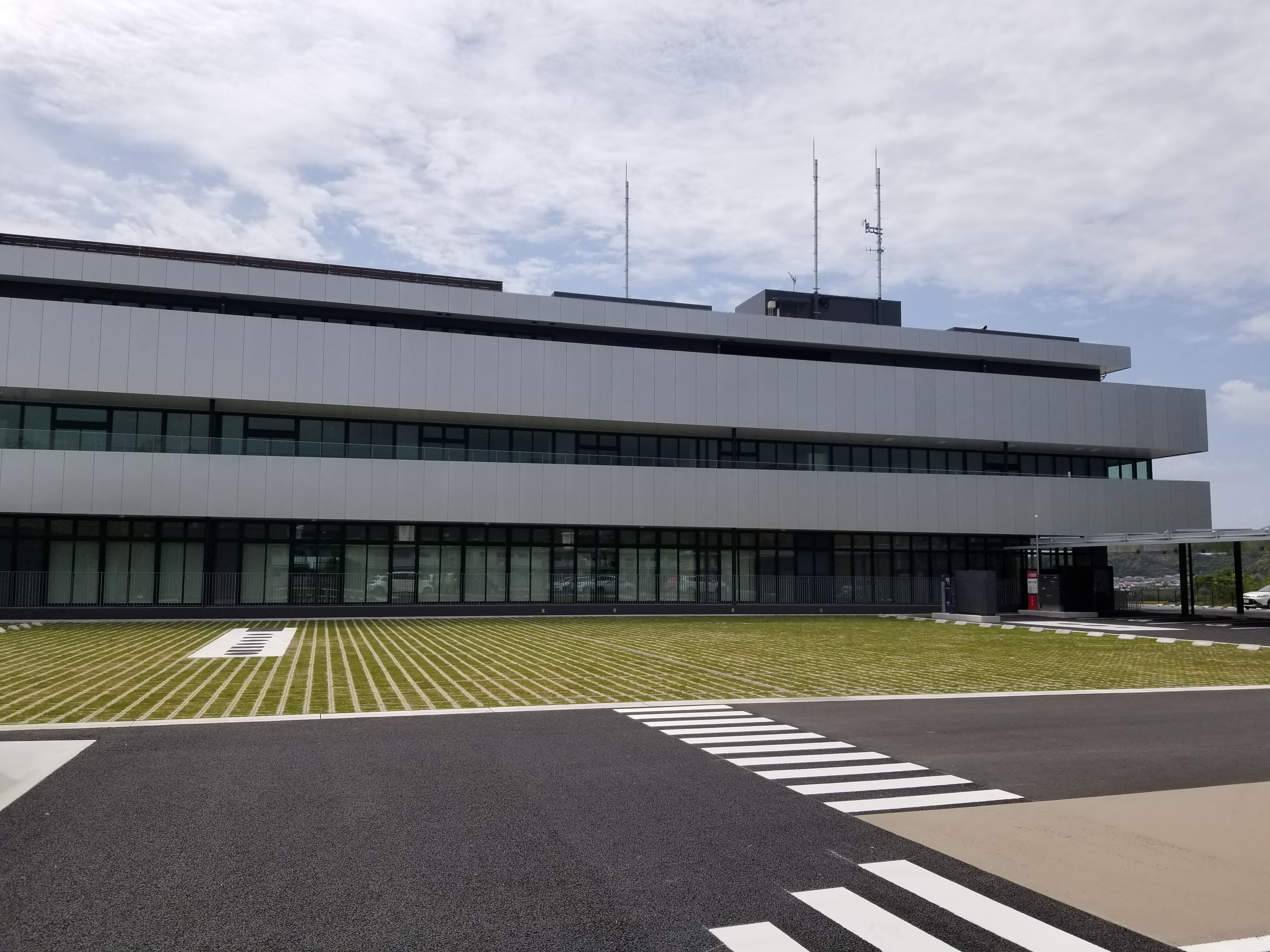
- Kadogawa Town Hall

- Flag Emblem
- Interactive map of Kadogawa
- Location in Japan
- Coordinates: 32°28′16″N 131°38′46″E
- Country: Japan
- Region: Kyushu
- Prefecture: Miyazaki
- District: Higashiusuki

Area
  - Total: 120.52 km^{2} (46.53 sq mi)

Population (October 1, 2023)
  - Total: 16,760
  - Density: 139.1/km^{2} (360.2/sq mi)
- Time zone: UTC+09:00 (JST)
- City hall address: 1-1 Heijo Higashi, Kadokawa-cho, Higashiusuki-gun, Miyazaki-ken 889-0696
- Website: Official website
- Symbols
- Flower: Salvia splendens
- Tree: Myrica rubra

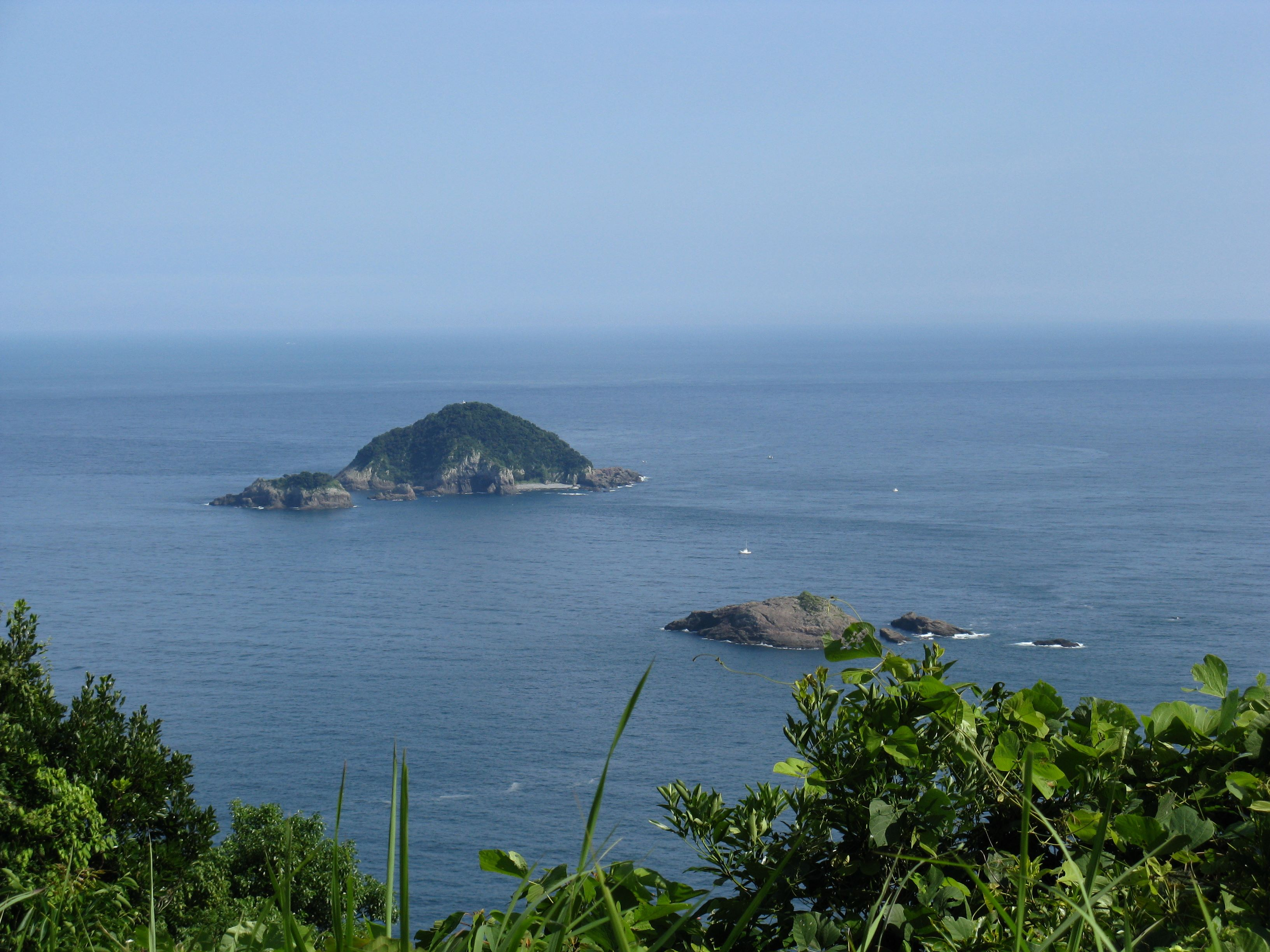
Jirojima

Kadogawa (門川町, Kadogawa-chō) is a town located in Higashiusuki District, Miyazaki Prefecture, Japan. As of 1 October 2023, the town has an estimated population of 16,760 in 6887 households and a population density of 140 persons per km^{2}. The total area of the town is 120.52 square kilometres (46.53 sq mi).

== Geography ==
Kadogawa is located in the northern part of Miyazaki Prefecture, about 15 kilometers south of the center of Nobeoka City, and about 70 kilometers northeast of Miyazaki City, the prefectural capital. The eastern side of the town area faces the Hyūga Sea. The eastern coast is within the borders of the Nippō Kaigan Quasi-National Park.

=== Neighbouring municipalities ===
Miyazaki Prefecture

- Hyuga
- Misato
- Nobeoka

=== Climate ===
Kadogawa has a humid subtropical climate (Köppen Cfa) characterized by warm summers and cool winters with light to no snowfall. The average annual temperature in Kadogawa is 16.4 °C. The average annual rainfall is 2,461 mm, with September being the wettest month. The temperatures peak in August, averaging around 26.1 °C, and are lowest in January, at around 6.5 °C.

== Demographics ==
Per Japanese census data, the population of Kadogawa has remained relatively steady for the past 40 years.

Historical population
| Year | Pop. | ±% |
|---|---|---|
| 1940 | 12,178 | — |
| 1950 | 15,743 | +29.3% |
| 1960 | 15,764 | +0.1% |
| 1970 | 15,540 | −1.4% |
| 1980 | 15,334 | −1.3% |
| 1990 | 18,533 | +20.9% |
| 2000 | 18,894 | +1.9% |
| 2010 | 19,287 | +2.1% |
| 2020 | 18,857 | −2.2% |

== History ==
The area of Kadogawa was part of ancient Hyūga Province. During the Edo period, it was part of the holdings of Nobeoka Domain. The village Kadogawa within Higashiusuki District, Miyazaki was established on April 1, 1889, with the creation of the modern municipalities system. Kadogawa was elevated to town status on February 11, 1935.

== Government ==
Kadogawa has a mayor-council form of government with a directly elected mayor and a unicameral town council of 14 members. Kadogawa, collectively with the villages of Morotsuka and Shiiba contributes one member to the Miyazaki Prefectural Assembly. In terms of national politics, the town is part of the Miyazaki 2nd district of the lower house of the Diet of Japan.

== Economy ==
Facing the Hyūga Sea, commercial fishing and seafood processing industries have traditionally been the mainstay of the local economy. However, it is increasingly developing as a commuter town due to its proximity to Nobeoka and Hyuga cities.

== Education ==
Kadogawa has three public elementary school and one public junior high schools operated by the town government and one public high school operated by the Miyazaki Prefectural Board of Education.

== Transportation ==
=== Railways ===
JR Kyushu - Nippō Main Line

- Kadogawa

=== Highways ===
- Higashikyushu Expressway
- National Route 10
- National Route 388

== Noted people from Kadogawa ==
- Taku Etō, politician
