= Misato, Miyazaki =

Misato 美郷町
- Town
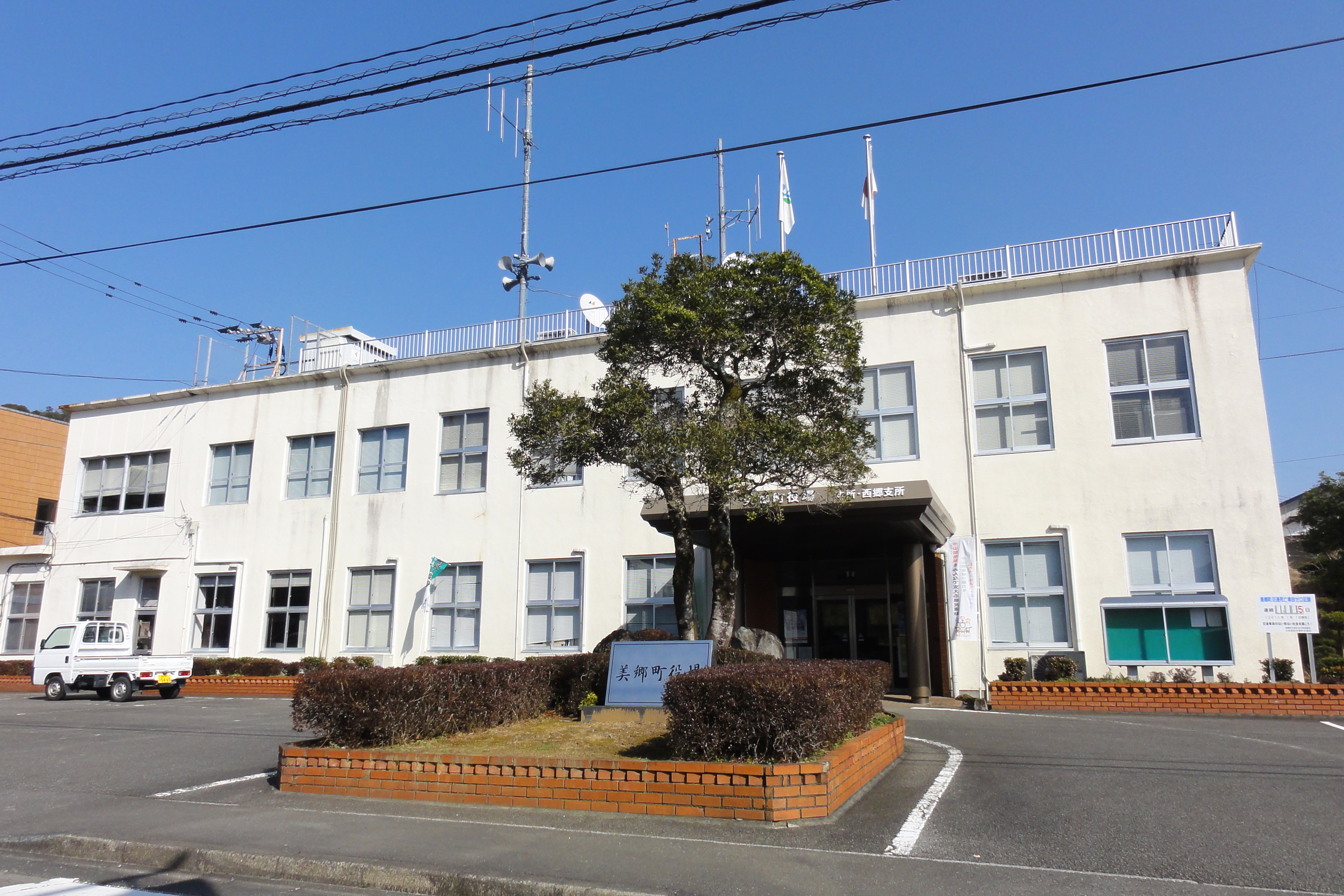
- Misato Town hall

- Flag Chapter
- Interactive map of Misato
- Location in Japan
- Coordinates: 32°26′25″N 131°25′23″E
- Country: Japan
- Region: Kyushu
- Prefecture: Miyazaki
- District: Higashiusuki

Area
  - Total: 448.84 km^{2} (173.30 sq mi)

Population (August 31, 2023)
  - Total: 4,397
  - Density: 9.796/km^{2} (25.37/sq mi)
- Time zone: UTC+09:00 (JST)
- City hall address: Saigo-ku, Tashiro 1, Misato-cho, Higashiusuki-gun, Miyazaki-ken883-1101
- Climate: Cfa
- Website: Official website
- Symbols
- Bird: Japanese white-eye
- Flower: Prunus mume
- Tree: Ternstroemia gymnanthera

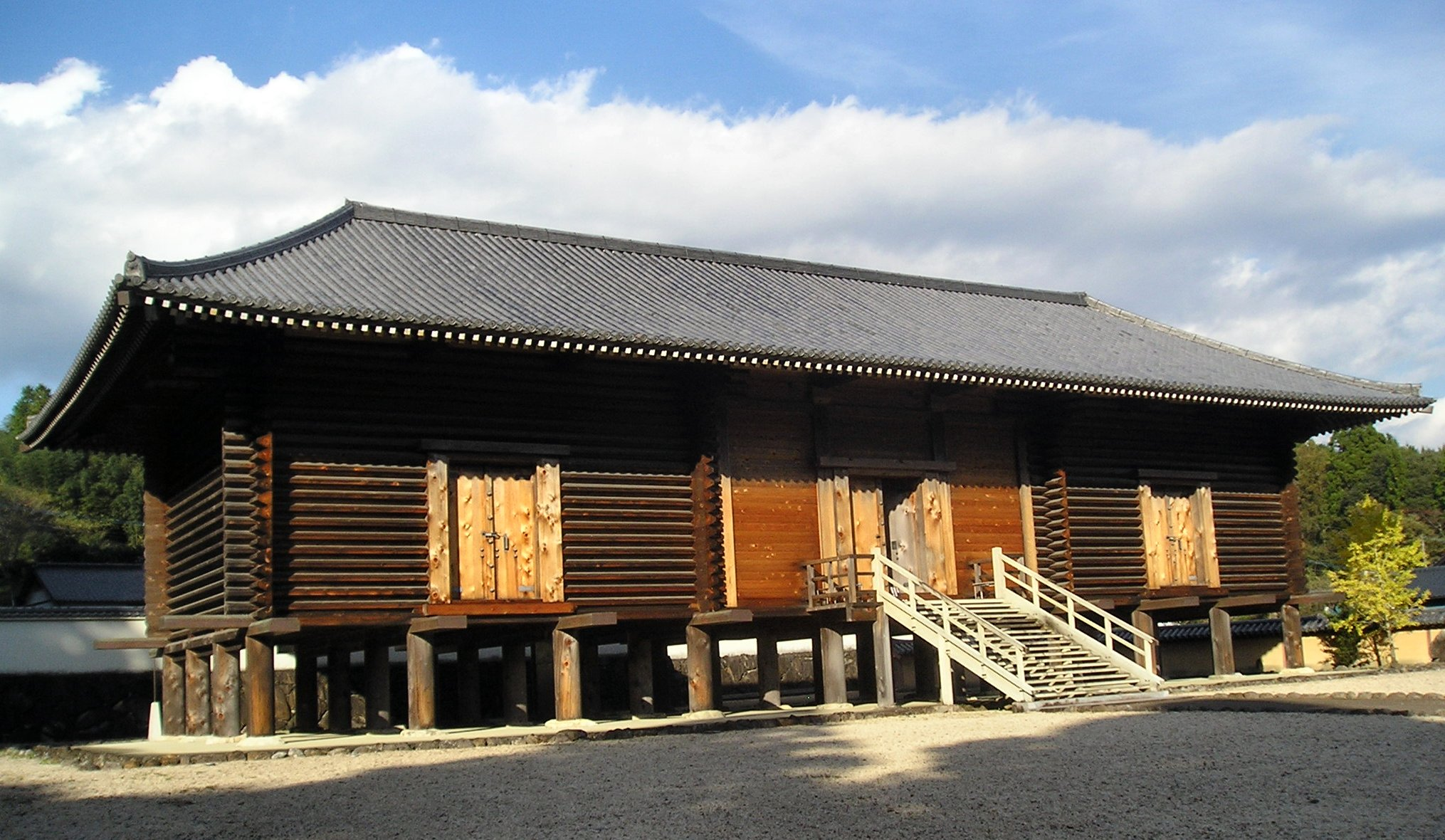
Shosoin style in Misato, which built by part of tourism and relationship in Japan and South Korea

Misato (美郷町, Misato-chō) is a town located in Higashiusuki District, Miyazaki Prefecture, Japan. As of 31 August 2023, the town has an estimated population of 4297 in 2020 households, and a population density of 9.8 persons per km^{2}. The total area of the town is 448.84 square kilometres (173.30 sq mi)..

== Geography ==
Misato is located in northern Miyazaki Prefecture in the steep Kyushu Mountains. Approximately 90% of the town area is forest.

=== Neighbouring municipalities ===
Miyazaki Prefecture

- Hinokage
- Hyūga
- Kadogawa
- Kijō
- Morotsuka
- Nobeoka
- Saito
- Shiiba

=== Climate ===
Misato has a humid subtropical climate (Köppen climate classification Cfa) with hot, humid summers and cool winters. The average annual temperature in Misato is 14.9 °C (58.8 °F). The average annual rainfall is 3,229.0 mm (127.13 in) with August as the wettest month. The temperatures are highest on average in August, at around 25.5 °C (77.9 °F), and lowest in January, at around 3.9 °C (39.0 °F). The highest temperature ever recorded in Misato was 39.9 °C (103.8 °F) on 2 August 2026; the coldest temperature ever recorded was −11.1 °C (12.0 °F) on 27 February 1981.

Climate data for Nangō, Misato (1991−2020 normals, extremes 1979−present)
Month	Jan	Feb	Mar	Apr	May	Jun	Jul	Aug	Sep	Oct	Nov	Dec	Year
Record high °C (°F)	23.1 (73.6)	23.9 (75.0)	29.6 (85.3)	31.9 (89.4)	34.7 (94.5)	35.0 (95.0)	39.2 (102.6)	39.9 (103.8)	35.4 (95.7)	33.1 (91.6)	28.2 (82.8)	23.7 (74.7)	39.9 (103.8)
Mean daily maximum °C (°F)	11.8 (53.2)	13.3 (55.9)	16.5 (61.7)	21.4 (70.5)	25.1 (77.2)	26.7 (80.1)	31.2 (88.2)	31.6 (88.9)	28.4 (83.1)	24.1 (75.4)	18.9 (66.0)	13.7 (56.7)	21.9 (71.4)
Daily mean °C (°F)	3.9 (39.0)	5.6 (42.1)	9.2 (48.6)	13.9 (57.0)	18.1 (64.6)	21.3 (70.3)	25.2 (77.4)	25.5 (77.9)	22.4 (72.3)	17.0 (62.6)	11.2 (52.2)	5.7 (42.3)	14.9 (58.9)
Mean daily minimum °C (°F)	−2.0 (28.4)	−0.6 (30.9)	2.8 (37.0)	7.2 (45.0)	12.1 (53.8)	17.3 (63.1)	21.0 (69.8)	21.4 (70.5)	18.3 (64.9)	11.9 (53.4)	5.7 (42.3)	0.0 (32.0)	9.6 (49.3)
Record low °C (°F)	−10.7 (12.7)	−11.1 (12.0)	−8.1 (17.4)	−3.6 (25.5)	1.4 (34.5)	7.5 (45.5)	11.9 (53.4)	13.0 (55.4)	6.3 (43.3)	−1.0 (30.2)	−4.4 (24.1)	−9.5 (14.9)	−11.1 (12.0)
Average precipitation mm (inches)	70.9 (2.79)	104.1 (4.10)	166.3 (6.55)	185.9 (7.32)	237.9 (9.37)	519.7 (20.46)	479.5 (18.88)	548.2 (21.58)	534.2 (21.03)	217.1 (8.55)	91.1 (3.59)	74.1 (2.92)	3,229 (127.13)
Average precipitation days (≥ 1.0 mm)	6.2	7.8	11.0	10.6	11.0	16.9	14.2	13.7	13.5	8.6	7.4	6.2	127.1
Mean monthly sunshine hours	180.2	164.6	182.6	187.3	181.4	110.9	160.6	166.1	135.8	163.0	158.5	172.3	1,963.4
Source: Japan Meteorological Agency

=== Demographics ===
Per Japanese census data, the population of Misato in 2020 is 4,826 people. Misato has been conducting censuses since 1920.

Historical population

Year	Pop.	±%
1920	15,573	—
1925	16,197	+4.0%
1930	18,611	+14.9%
1935	17,516	−5.9%
1940	17,440	−0.4%
1945	18,803	+7.8%
1950	19,880	+5.7%
1955	21,382	+7.6%
1960	19,410	−9.2%
1965	16,101	−17.0%
1970	13,219	−17.9%

Year	Pop.	±%
1975	11,436	−13.5%
1980	10,709	−6.4%
1985	9,855	−8.0%
1990	8,984	−8.8%
1995	8,251	−8.2%
2000	7,509	−9.0%
2005	6,874	−8.5%
2010	6,248	−9.1%
2015	5,480	−12.3%
2020	4,826	−11.9%

Misato population statistics

== History ==
The area of Misato was part of ancient Hyūga Province. During the Edo period, it was part of the holdings of Nobeoka Domain. The villages of Kitagō, Nangō and Saigō, within Higashiusuki District, Miyazaki was established on April 1, 1889, with the creation of the modern municipalities system. The three villages merged on January 1, 2006, to form the town of Misato.

== Government ==
Misato has a mayor-council form of government with a directly elected mayor and a unicameral town council of 11 members. Misato, collectively with the villages of Morotsuka and Shiiba and town of Kadogawa contributes one member to the Miyazaki Prefectural Assembly. In terms of national politics, the town is part of the Miyazaki 2nd district of the lower house of the Diet of Japan.

== Economy ==
Misato has an economy based overwhelmingly on agriculture and forestry.

== Education ==
Misato has one public elementary school and one public junior high school and two combined elementary/junior high schools operated by the town government. The town does not have a high school.

== Transportation ==
=== Railways ===
Misato has no passenger rail service. The nearest train station is Hyūgashi on the JR Kyushu Nippō Main Line

=== Highways ===
- National Route 327
- National Route 388
- National Route 466

== Sister cities ==
- Buyeo County, South Korea, since November 2009

== Local attractions ==
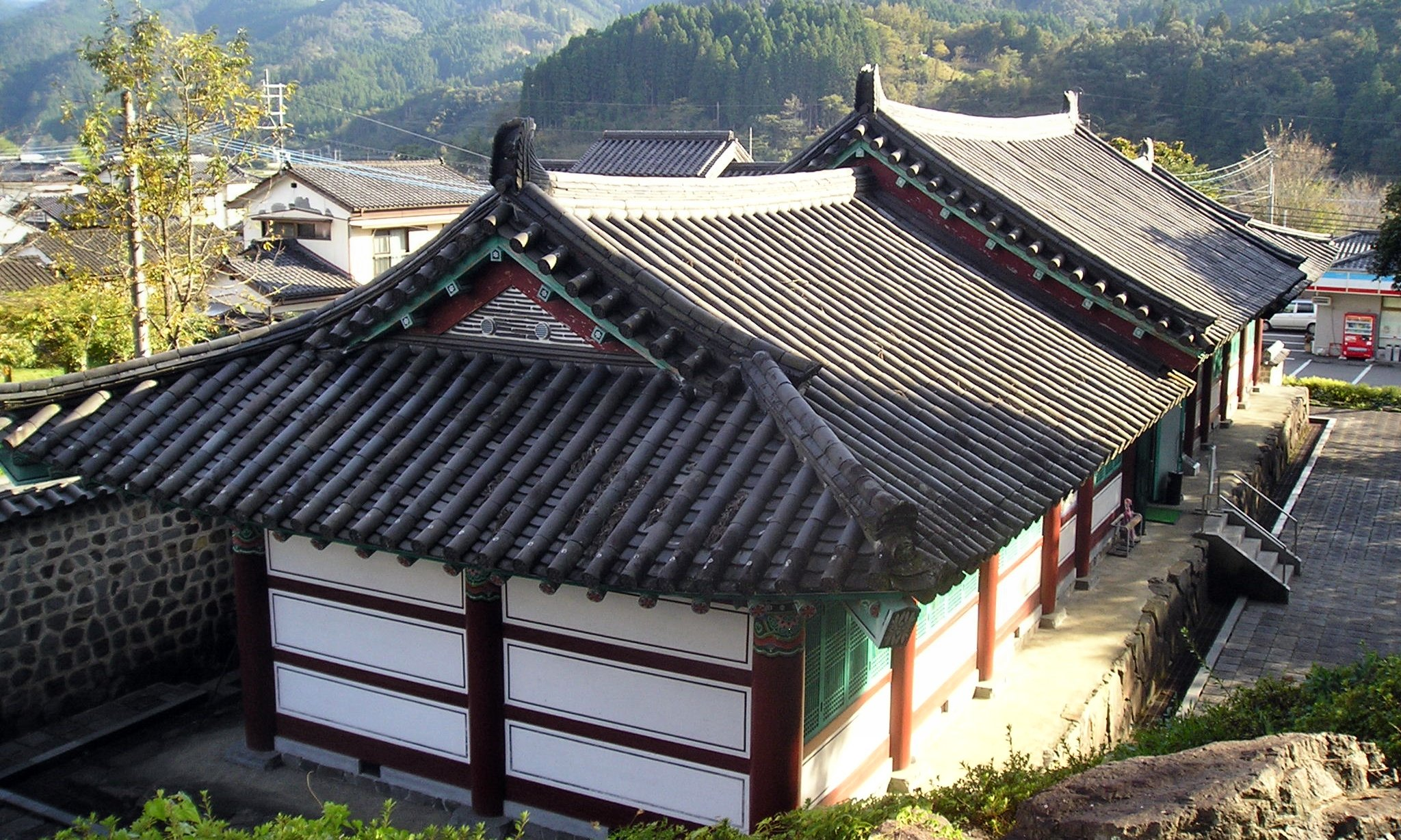
Museum of Baekje in Misato

- The Museum of Baekje in Misato and West Shosoin in Misato, both built in 1996, as part of the tourism partnership in Japan and South Korea.
