= Hinokage, Miyazaki =

Hinokage 日之影町
- Town
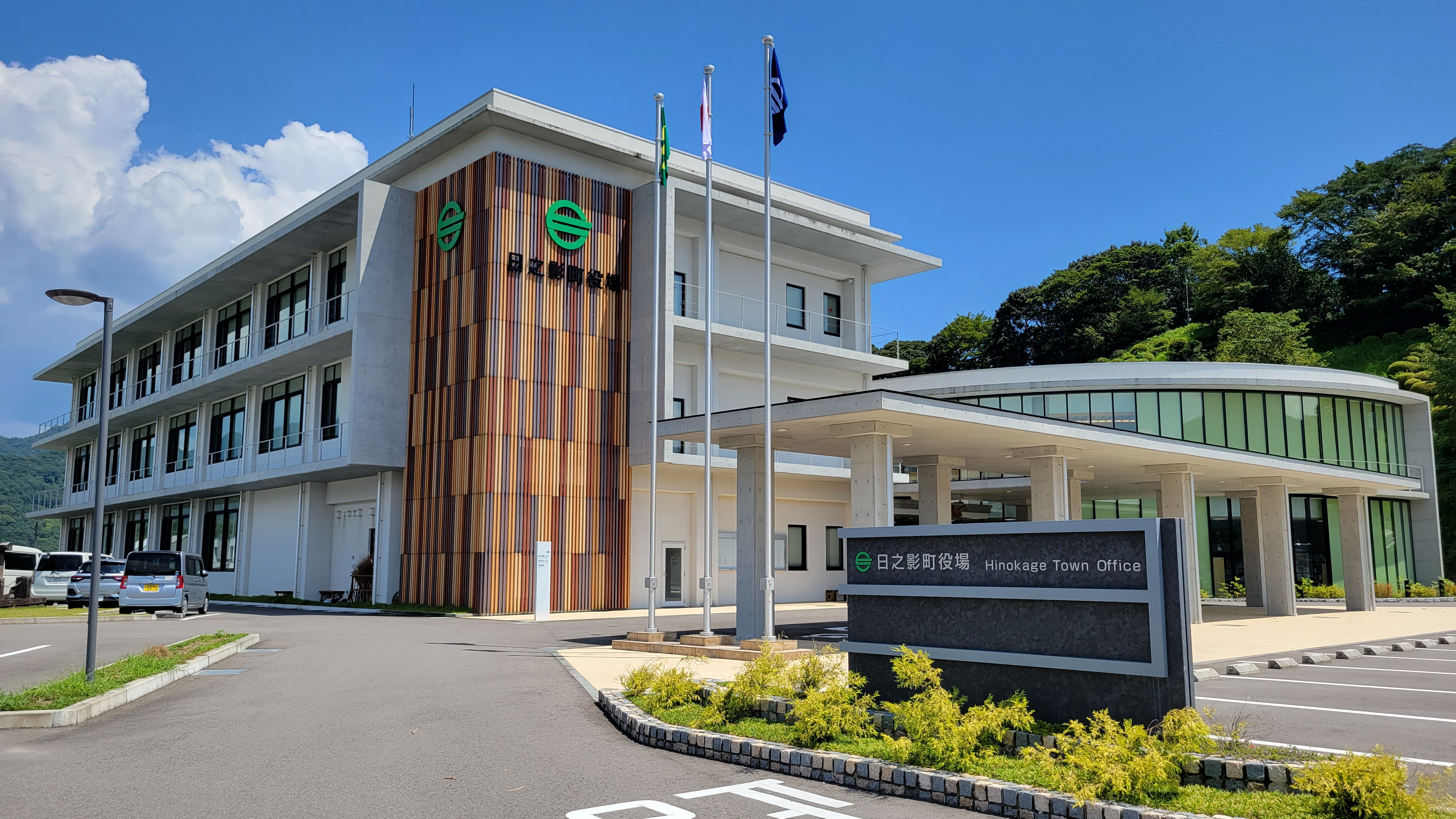
- Hinokage Town Office

- Flag Emblem
- Interactive map of Hinokage
- Location in Japan
- Coordinates: 32°39′34″N 131°22′51″E
- Country: Japan
- Region: Kyushu
- Prefecture: Miyazaki
- District: Nishiusuki

Area
  - Total: 277.67 km^{2} (107.21 sq mi)

Population (October 1, 2023)
  - Total: 3,260
  - Density: 11.7/km^{2} (30.4/sq mi)
- Time zone: UTC+09:00 (JST)
- City hall address: 9079 Nanaori, Hinokage-cho, Nishiusuki-gun, Miyazaki-ken 882-0401
- Website: Official website
- Symbols
- Bird: Japanese bush warbler
- Flower: Azalea
- Tree: Japanese zelkova

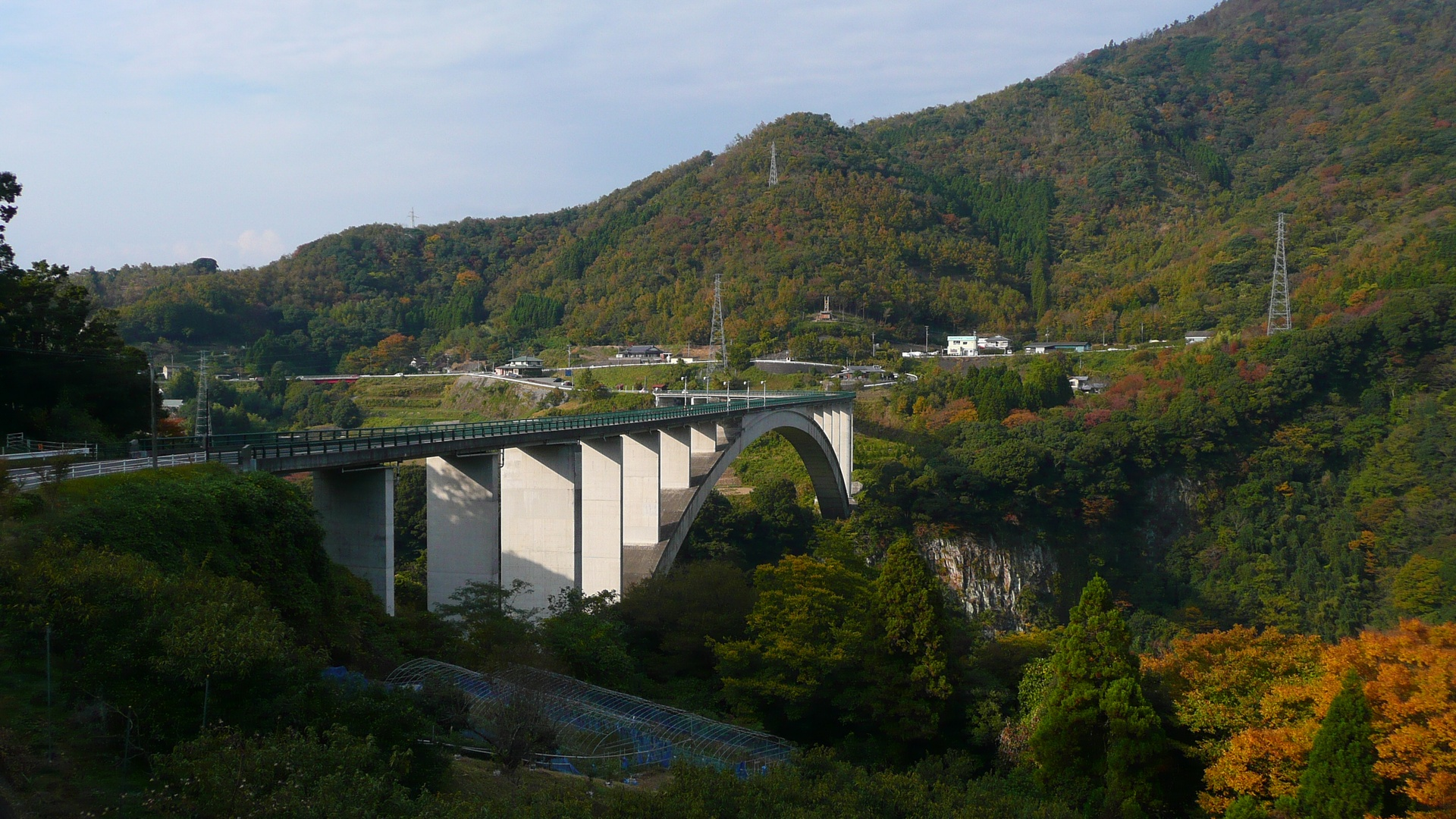
Tensho Bridge

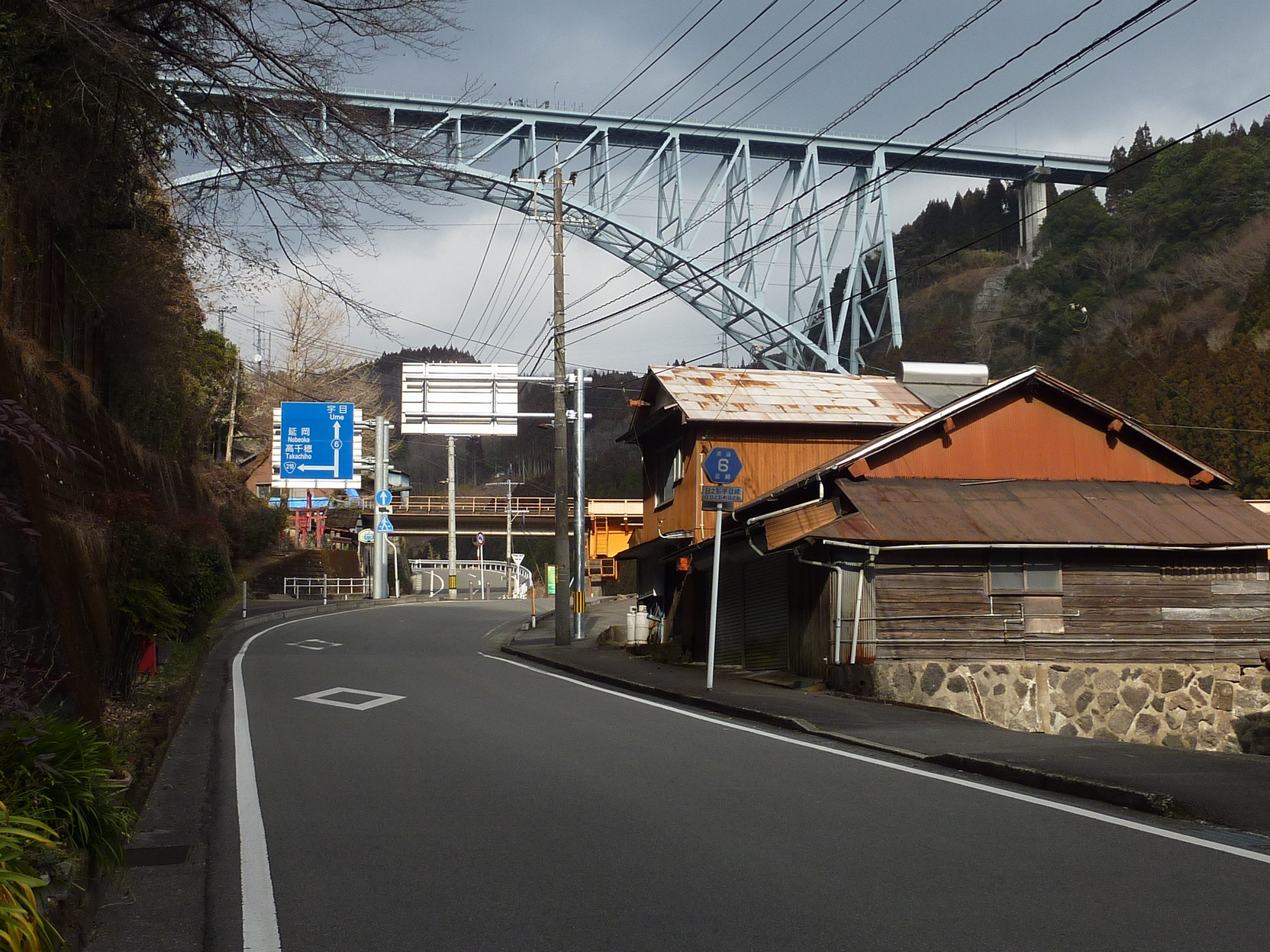
Miyazaki Prefectural Road 6 in Hinokage

Hinokage (日之影町, Hinokage-chō) is a town located in Nishiusuki District, Miyazaki Prefecture, Japan. As of 1 October 2023, the town has an estimated population of 3260 in 1400 households, and a population density of 12 persons per km^{2}. The total area of the town is 277.67 square kilometres (107.21 sq mi). Located next to the historically significant town of Takachiho, Hinokage is known primarily for its three large bridges, traditional Kagura dances, and the work of Kazuo Hiroshima, a traditional weaver of bamboo baskets.

== Geography ==
Hinokage is located in northern Miyazaki Prefecture in the Kyushu Mountains. It measuring approximately 9 kilometers from east-to-west and 30 kilometers from north-to-south, with approximately 90% of the area being forest. The Gokase River flows through the center of the town from east-to-west. Many valleys flow into the Gokase River, forming deep V-shaped valleys with sheer cliffs 50 to 100 meters high, on top of which, cultivated land has been opened in a step-like manner, and many large and small hamlets have formed.

=== Neighbouring municipalities ===
Miyazaki Prefecture

- Misato
- Morotsuka
- Nobeoka
- Takachiho

Oita Prefecture

- Bungo-Ōno
- Saiki

=== Climate ===
Hinokage has a humid subtropical climate (Köppen Cfa) characterized by warm summers and cool winters with light to no snowfall. The average annual temperature in Hinokage is 12.7 °C. The average annual rainfall is 2169 mm with September as the wettest month. The temperatures are highest on average in August, at around 23.2 °C, and lowest in January, at around 1.7 °C.

=== Demographics ===
Per Japanese census data, the population of Hinokage is less than a third of what it was 50 years ago. Like many districts in rural Japan, the area has been struggling with an aging population and an exodus of young people to Tokyo and other major cities. The town's population peaked in the 1950s at 16,199 people, (Cort & Nakamura, 1994) but has steadily declined since the closure of the Mitate mine in March, 1970. (記念編纂部会, 1997) Between 2000 and 2005 four area elementary and middle schools were closed, and more closures are planned in the future.

Historical population
Year	Pop.	±%
1970	15,711	—
1980	10,261	−34.7%
1990	8,013	−21.9%
2000	6,550	−18.3%
2010	5,445	−16.9%
2020	4,463	−18.0%

== History ==
The area of Hinokage was part of ancient Hyūga Province. The area has been settled since the Japanese Paleolithic period, and the place name of "Hinokage" is found in the Nihon Shoki and other ancient texts as having been given to this area by the elder brother of Emperor Jimmu. During the Edo period, it was part of the holdings of Nobeoka Domain. The villages of Nanori (七折村), and Iwaikawa (岩井川村), within Nishiusuki District, Miyazaki were established on April 1, 1889 with the creation of the modern municipalities system. The two villages merged on January 1, 1951 to form the town of Hinokage.

== Government ==
Hinokage has a mayor-council form of government with a directly elected mayor and a unicameral town council of eight members. Hinokage, collectively with the towns of Gokase and Takachiho contributes one member to the Miyazaki Prefectural Assembly. In terms of national politics, the town is part of the Miyazaki 2nd district of the lower house of the Diet of Japan.

== Economy ==
The main industry of Hinokage is agriculture and forestry. Tin was once mined at the Mitate Mine in the northern part of town, but it was closed in 1963. Local specialities include bamboo crafts, processed fruit products and dried shiitake mushrooms.

== Education ==
Hinokage has three public elementary schools and one public junior high school operated by the town government. The town does not have a high school.

== Transportation ==
=== Railways ===
Hinokage has no passenger rail service. The nearest train station is Nobeoka on the JR Kyushu Nippō Main Line. The town was formerly served by the 50.0 Takachiho Railway, which ran from Nobeoka to Takachiho Station, with six intermediate stations within Hinokage. Services were discontinued on September 6, 2005, after flooding triggered by Typhoon Nabi washed away two bridges on the line, halting all operations. Efforts to obtain funding for rebuilding were unsuccessful, and the company was liquidated in 2009.

=== Highways ===
- Kyushu Chūō Expressway
- National Route 218
