= Gokase, Miyazaki =

Gokase 五ヶ瀬町
- Town
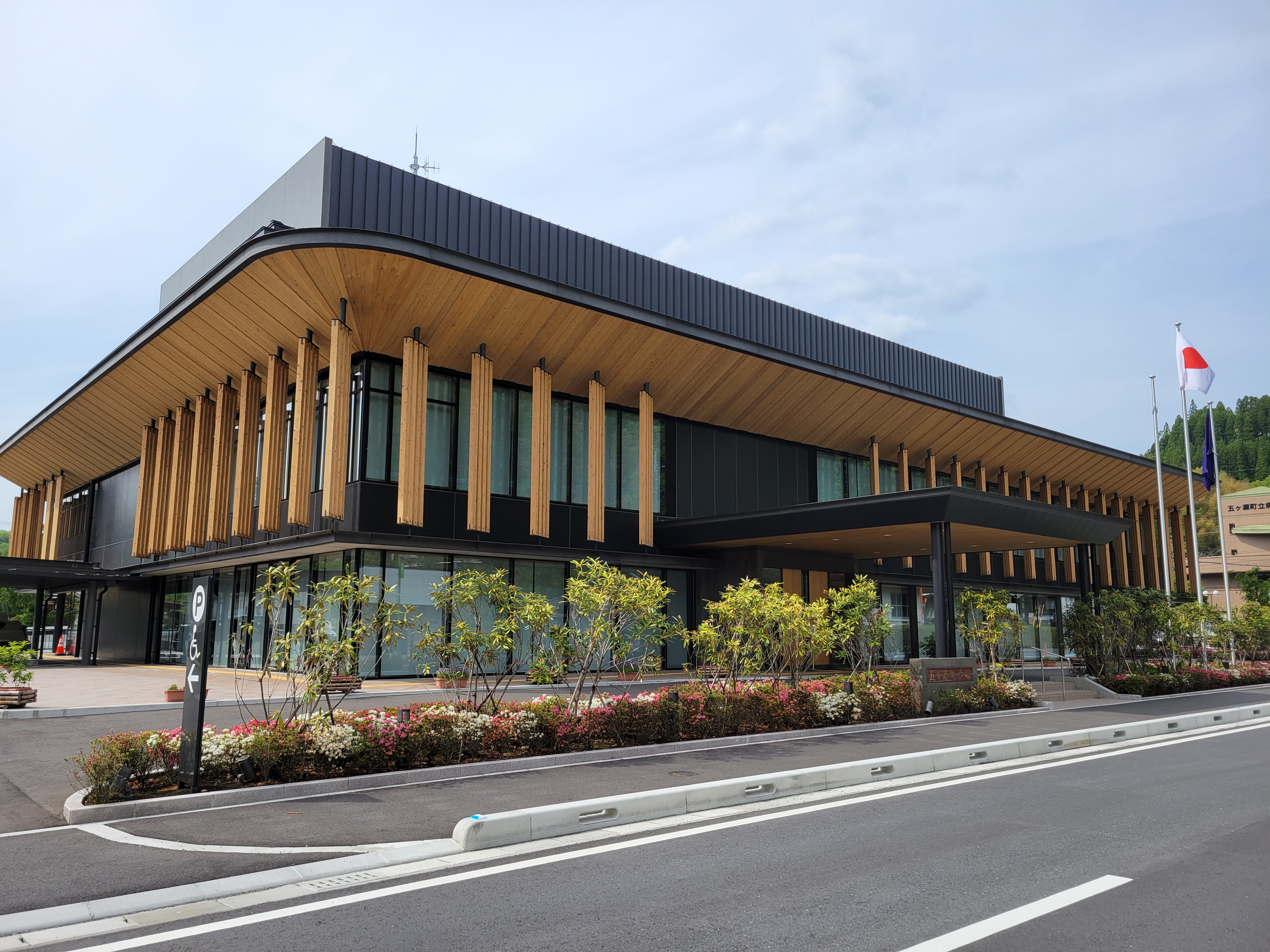
- Gokase Town Hall

- Flag Emblem
- Interactive map of Gokase
- Location in Japan
- Coordinates: 32°40′58″N 131°11′43″E
- Country: Japan
- Region: Kyushu
- Prefecture: Miyazaki
- District: Nishiusuki

Area
  - Total: 171.73 km^{2} (66.31 sq mi)

Population (September 30, 2023)
  - Total: 3,400
  - Density: 20/km^{2} (51/sq mi)
- Time zone: UTC+09:00 (JST)
- City hall address: 1670 Mikasho, Gokase-cho, Nishiusuki-gun, Miyazaki-ken 882-1295
- Climate: Cfa
- Website: Official website
- Symbols
- Bird: Japanese white-eye
- Flower: Rhododendron
- Tree: Pine

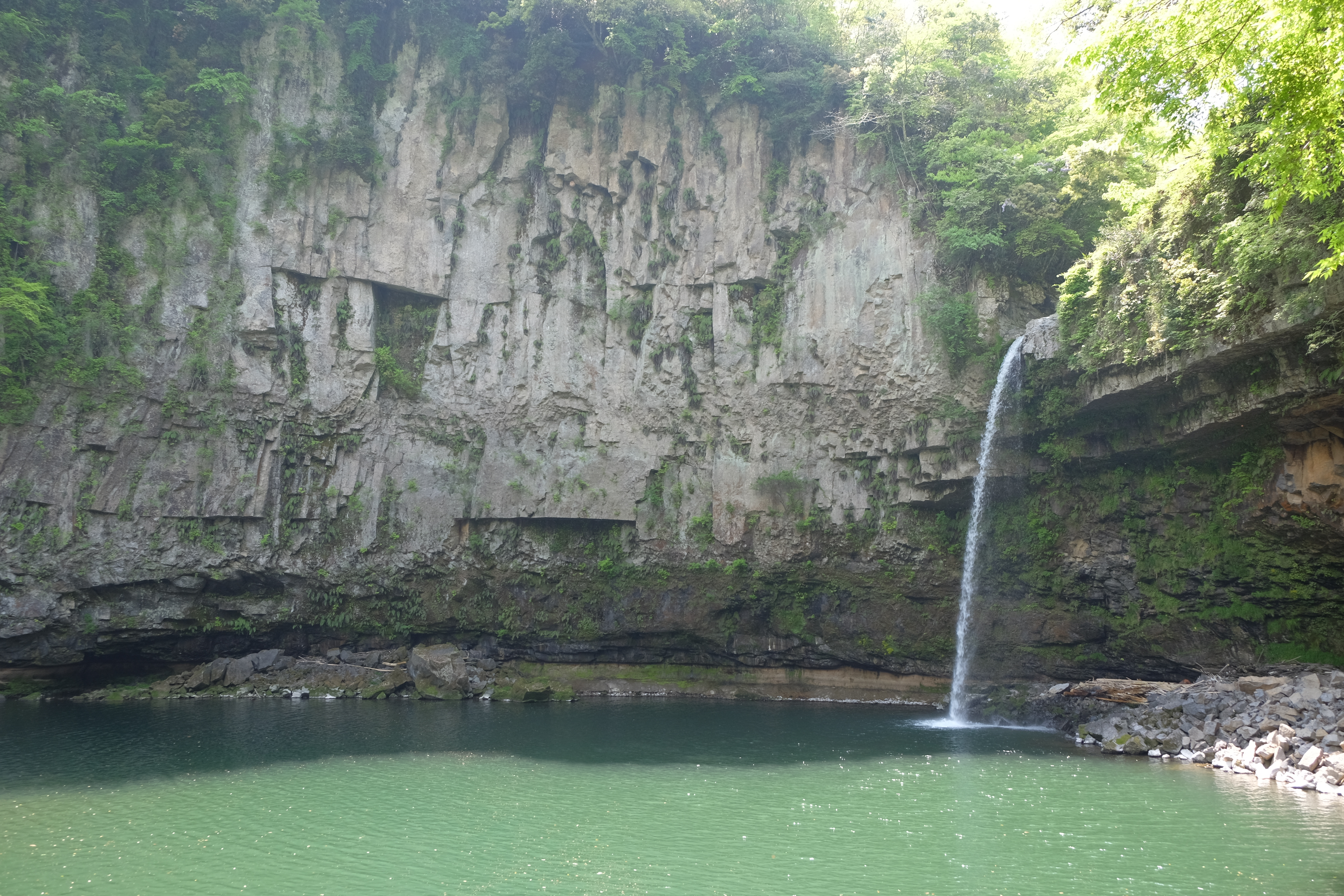
Unokono Falls

Gokase (五ヶ瀬町, Gokase-chō) is a town in Nishiusuki District, Miyazaki Prefecture, Japan. As of 30 September 2023, the town has an estimated population of 3400 in 1504 households and a population density of 20 persons per km^{2}. The total area of the town is 171.73 square kilometres (66.31 sq mi).

== Geography ==
Gokase is located in the northwest Miyazaki Prefecture, in the center of the Kyushu Mountains, and borders Kumamoto Prefecture from the northern part of the town to the northwest, west, and southwest. The area is generally high in altitude, with even the hilly area in the north, the center of the town, being over 500 meters above sea level, and the southern part of the town being mountainous, over 1,000 meters above sea level. It takes about 2 hours and 30 minutes to reach the prefectural capital, Miyazaki City, by car, while Kumamoto City can be reached in about 1 1/2 hours, so the relationship with Kumamoto Prefecture is close.

=== Neighbouring municipalities ===
Kumamoto Prefecture

- Yamato

Miyazaki Prefecture

- Morotsuka
- Shiiba
- Takachiho

=== Climate ===
Gokase has a humid subtropical climate (Köppen climate classification Cfa) with hot, humid summers and cool winters. The average annual temperature in Gokase is 12.9 °C (55.2 °F). The average annual rainfall is 2,449.0 mm (96.42 in) with June as the wettest month. The temperatures are highest on average in August, at around 23.6 °C (74.5 °F), and lowest in January, at around 1.8 °C (35.2 °F). The highest temperature ever recorded in Takachiho was 36.2 °C (97.2 °F) on 2 August 2026; the coldest temperature ever recorded was −12.9 °C (8.8 °F) on 21 February 1983. Summers are cool, with the average daily temperature in August being about the same as Aomori City (23.5 °C), and the average minimum temperature being about the same as Hachinohe City (19.5 °C), with 28.6 midsummer days and only two extremely hot days in the past. Winters are relatively cold, and the average temperature in January is about the same as Sendai City (2.0 °C). Due to the effects of strong cold air and low pressure on the south coast, snow tends to accumulate, and heavy snowfall of 20 cm or more can occur, but it is not a heavy snowfall area. The southernmost ski resort in Japan is located on the eastern ridge of Mt. Kousaka in the southwestern part of the town.

Climate data for Gokase (1991−2020 normals, extremes 1979−present)
Month	Jan	Feb	Mar	Apr	May	Jun	Jul	Aug	Sep	Oct	Nov	Dec	Year
Record high °C (°F)	19.2 (66.6)	21.6 (70.9)	26.2 (79.2)	27.8 (82.0)	31.3 (88.3)	34.5 (94.1)	35.4 (95.7)	36.2 (97.2)	32.8 (91.0)	29.9 (85.8)	27.0 (80.6)	21.5 (70.7)	36.2 (97.2)
Mean daily maximum °C (°F)	7.0 (44.6)	8.9 (48.0)	12.9 (55.2)	18.2 (64.8)	22.6 (72.7)	24.8 (76.6)	28.5 (83.3)	29.2 (84.6)	25.9 (78.6)	21.0 (69.8)	15.4 (59.7)	9.4 (48.9)	18.7 (65.6)
Daily mean °C (°F)	1.8 (35.2)	3.3 (37.9)	6.8 (44.2)	11.8 (53.2)	16.4 (61.5)	19.8 (67.6)	23.2 (73.8)	23.6 (74.5)	20.4 (68.7)	14.9 (58.8)	9.3 (48.7)	3.8 (38.8)	12.9 (55.2)
Mean daily minimum °C (°F)	−2.4 (27.7)	−1.6 (29.1)	1.4 (34.5)	5.9 (42.6)	10.9 (51.6)	15.7 (60.3)	19.2 (66.6)	19.6 (67.3)	16.2 (61.2)	10.1 (50.2)	4.4 (39.9)	−0.8 (30.6)	8.2 (46.8)
Record low °C (°F)	−12.1 (10.2)	−12.9 (8.8)	−9.8 (14.4)	−3.7 (25.3)	1.6 (34.9)	6.1 (43.0)	10.7 (51.3)	11.6 (52.9)	4.4 (39.9)	−1.2 (29.8)	−5.3 (22.5)	−10.2 (13.6)	−12.9 (8.8)
Average precipitation mm (inches)	87.0 (3.43)	100.9 (3.97)	136.4 (5.37)	132.6 (5.22)	160.6 (6.32)	436.3 (17.18)	411.4 (16.20)	333.0 (13.11)	332.9 (13.11)	132.4 (5.21)	91.9 (3.62)	93.8 (3.69)	2,449 (96.42)
Average precipitation days (≥ 1.0 mm)	10.0	10.2	12.5	11.5	10.6	15.9	14.8	14.0	11.9	8.4	8.8	9.5	138.1
Mean monthly sunshine hours	106.9	116.1	150.1	176.4	182.3	118.1	142.7	151.2	121.8	149.2	123.3	114.2	1,664.3
Source: Japan Meteorological Agency

=== Demographics ===
Per Japanese census data, the population of Gokase in 2020 is 3,472 people. Gokase has been conducting censuses since 1920.

Historical population
Year	Pop.	±%
1920	6,206	—
1925	6,535	+5.3%
1930	6,576	+0.6%
1935	7,701	+17.1%
1940	7,636	−0.8%
1945	8,723	+14.2%
1950	9,171	+5.1%
1955	9,598	+4.7%
1960	9,321	−2.9%
1965	8,264	−11.3%
1970	7,104	−14.0%
1975	6,347	−10.7%
1980	6,034	−4.9%
1985	5,808	−3.7%
1990	5,392	−7.2%
1995	5,265	−2.4%
2000	5,079	−3.5%
2005	4,812	−5.3%
2010	4,427	−8.0%
2015	3,887	−12.2%
2020	3,472	−10.7%
Gokase population statistics

== History ==
The area of Gokase was part of ancient Hyūga Province. During the Edo period, it was part of the holdings of Nobeoka Domain. The villages of Sankasho and Kuraoka within Nishiusuki District, Miyazaki were established on April 1, 1889, with the creation of the modern municipalities system. The two villages merged to form the town of Gokase on August 1, 1956.

== Government ==
Kadogawa has a mayor-council form of government with a directly elected mayor and a unicameral town council of nine members. Gokase, collectively with the towns of Takachiho and Hinokage contributes one member to the Miyazaki Prefectural Assembly. In terms of national politics, the town is part of the Miyazaki 2nd district of the lower house of the Diet of Japan.

== Economy ==
Gokase has a very rural economy, based on forestry and agriculture. Production of sansai and fish-farming of seema are important local economic activities.

== Education ==
Gokase has four public elementary school and one public junior high schools operated by the town government and one combined secondary school operated by the Miyazaki Prefectural Board of Education.

== Transportation ==
=== Railways ===
Gokase has no passenger train service. The nearest station is Takamori on the Minamiaso Railway Takamori Line or Tateno on the JR Kyushu Hōhi Main Line.

=== Highways ===
- Kyushu Chūō Expressway
- National Route 218
- National Route 265
- National Route 503
