= Shiiba, Miyazaki =

Shiiba 椎葉村
- Village
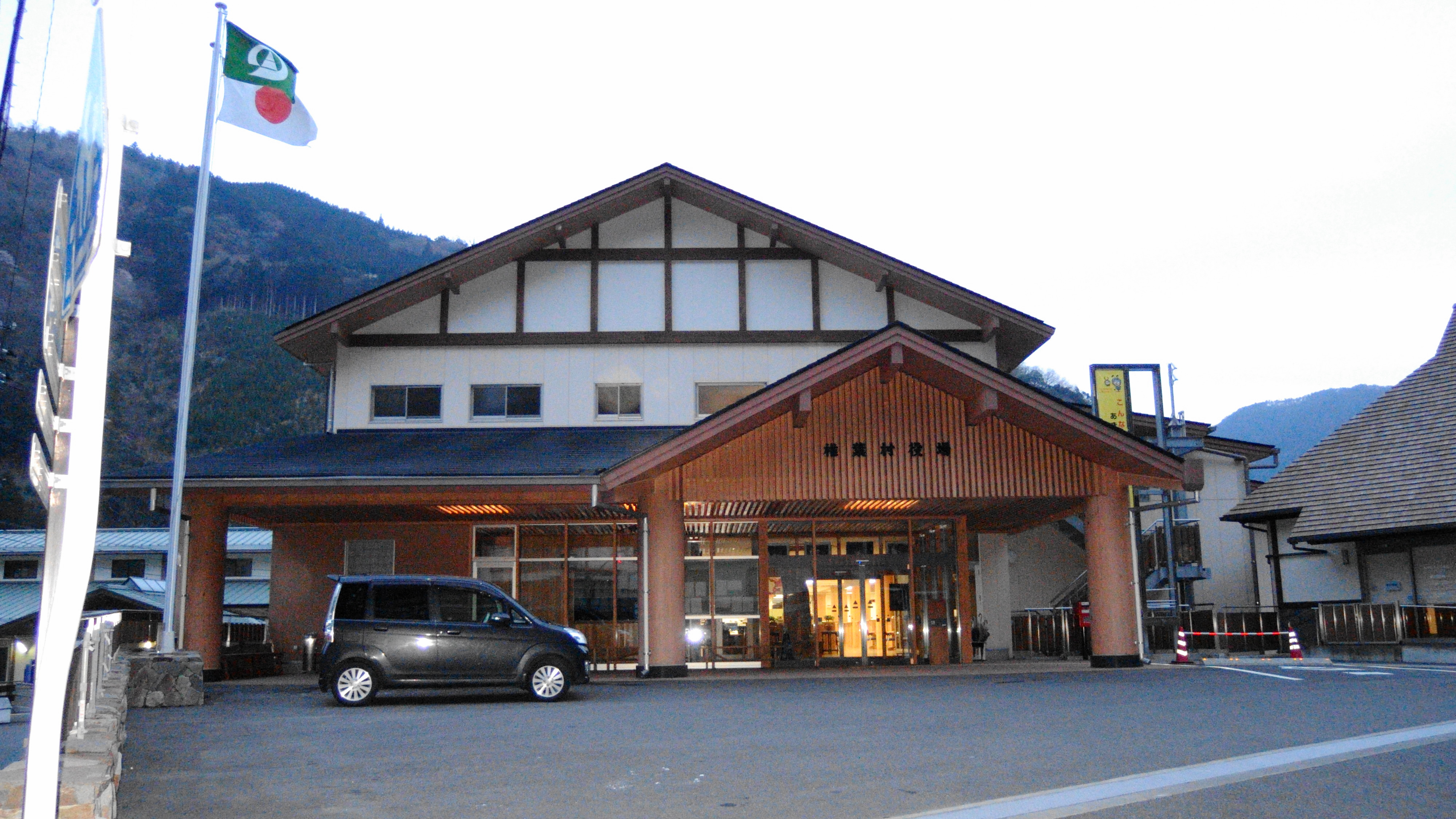
- Shiiba Village hall

- Flag Seal
- Location of Shiiba in Miyazaki Prefecture

- Location in Japan
- Coordinates: 32°28′02″N 131°9′30″E
- Country: Japan
- Region: Kyushu
- Prefecture: Miyazaki
- District: Higashiusuki

Area
  - Total: 537.29 km^{2} (207.45 sq mi)

Population (September 1, 2023)
  - Total: 2,299
  - Density: 4.279/km^{2} (11.08/sq mi)
- Time zone: UTC+09:00 (JST)
- City hall address: 1762-1 Shimofukura, Shiiba-son, Higashiusuki-gun, Miyazaki-ken 883-1601
- Website: Official website
- Symbols
- Bird: Copper pheasant
- Flower: Rhododendron
- Tree: Zanthoxylum piperitum

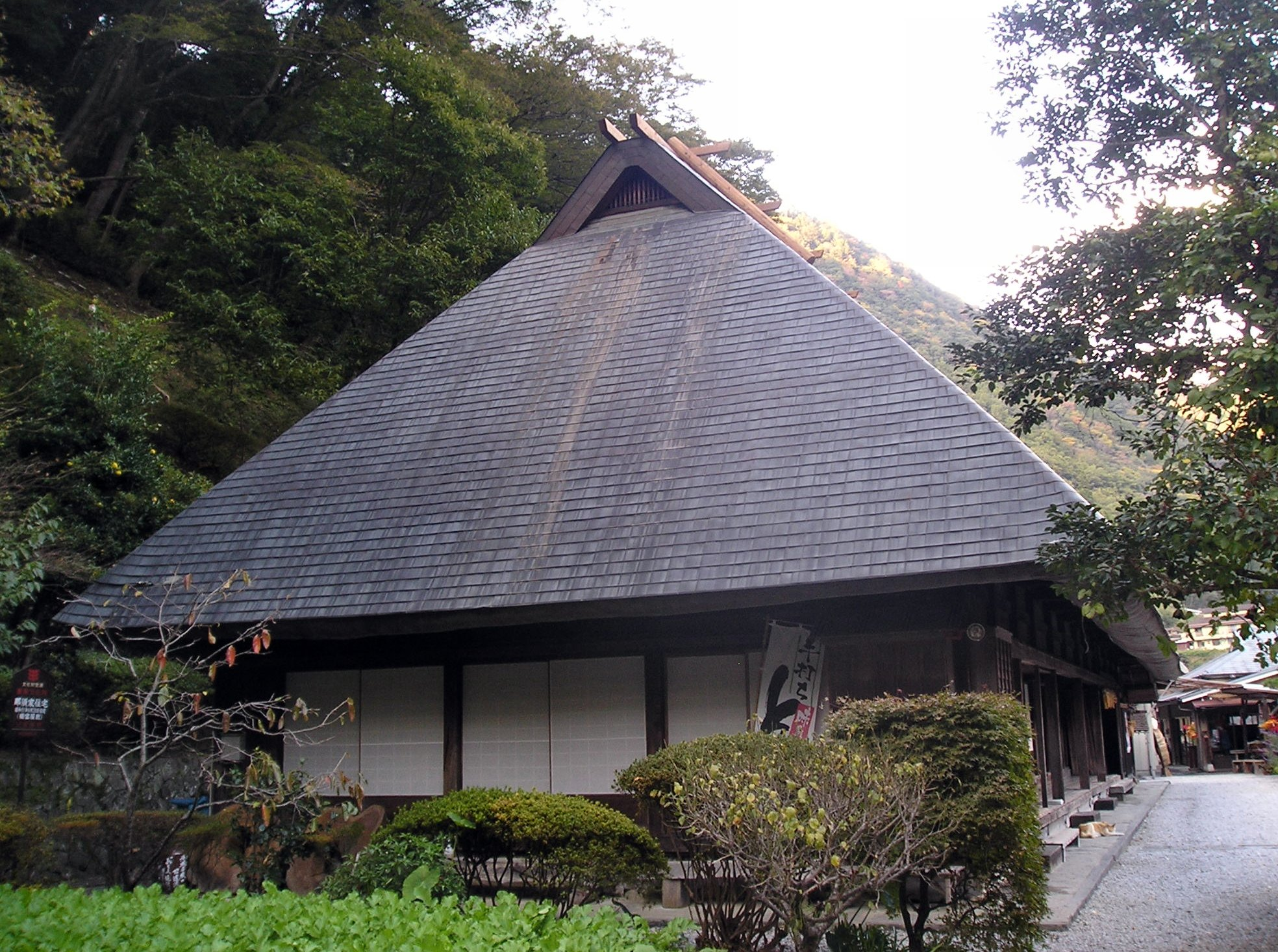
traditional house in Shiiba

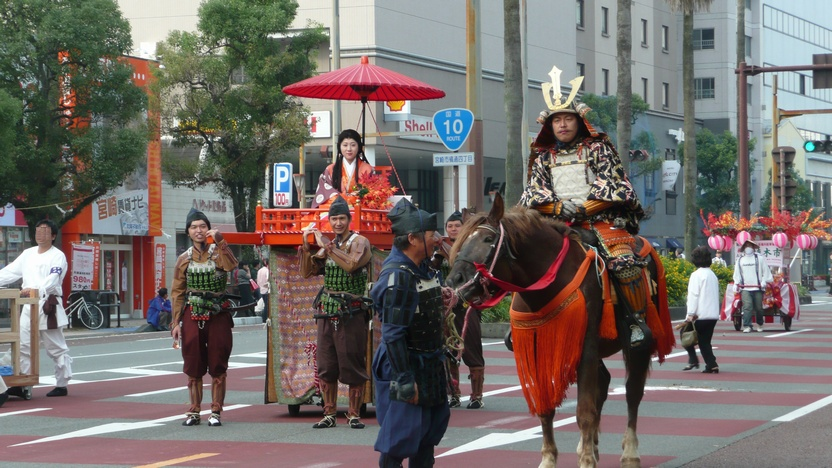
festival in Shiiba

Shiiba (椎葉村, Shiiba-son) is a village located in Higashiusuki District, Miyazaki Prefecture, Japan. As of 1 September 2023, the village had an estimated population of 2299 in 1023 households, and a population density of 4.3 persons per km^{2}. The total area of the village is 537.29 square kilometres (207.45 sq mi).

== Geography ==
Shiiba is a small, mountainous village situated in northwest Miyazaki prefecture, on the border with Kumamoto Prefecture. The entire area is surrounded by mountains ranging from 1,000 to 1,700 meters above sea level in the central Kyushu Mountains, including Mt. Kunimi in the northwest, and numerous rivers originate and flow through the valleys. Most of the village area is in the headwaters of the Mimi River, but the southern part of the village straddles the headwaters of the Hitotsuse and Komaru rivers. Due to the extremely rugged terrain, the habitable land area is only 4% of the village area, and villages exist scattered along rivers and on gentle slopes, mainly in the middle of mountains. The main area of Shiiba village (known as Kami-Shiiba) itself is quite small, however, several small hamlets surround the village to make up the area/region known as Shiiba. There are also a few dams located in the area, the main one being the Kamishiiba Dam which can be found in close proximity to Shiiba Secondary School. Due to its many rivers, waterfalls, and forests, it is an area of outstanding natural beauty. Most of the village is within the borders of the Kyūshū Chūō Sanchi Quasi-National Park.

Due to the remote, natural, cool environment of Shiiba, it is home to many kinds of wildlife. Although many of the native animals are rarely seen during the day, they can often be seen very early in the morning or at night, especially when driving. Shiiba is home to a large number of tanuki or raccoon dogs that live in the nearby forests and often come out at night to look for food.There are also a great number of wild boar in the area and they also come out at night and sometimes during the day to look for food.A large population of Sika deer also live in the Shiiba area. These animals are seldom seen, however, when they are spotted they will run off and disappear into the forest. This usually occurs during the early morning, dusk or at night time. In the late evening their cries can be heard all over Shiiba. Despite this, they have been known to jump in front of cars when startled and have caused a few accidents in the past. This is however, an uncommon occurrence. Both wild boar meat and deer meat are local delicacies that are often sold during the Heike festival (see below) and are sometimes served during special events and parties in the village.

The region is also host to a large number of insect groups. Although their numbers dwindle in the colder times of the year and are rarely seen, many are present during the summer months. A large number of Mantis can be seen during this period all over the village usually lying in wait to capture smaller insects for food. The summer also brings in a large number of butterflies, including large, almost hand-sized ones, that can be seen all over the place usually flying near plants and flowers. These can be seen in abundance around the local schools as many Japanese schools grow and keep flowers on their premises. During the summer months a variety of beetles can be found including rhinoceros beetles and the Japanese rhinoceros beetle. These large insects usually live underground and in cool, damp areas, hence they are not always easily seen. Many children in Japan, catch or buy these to breed or study them. Much like butterflies, they can be encountered around schools. Cockroaches can occasionally be seen during the humid periods of the summer months, however, they are not as common as they are in other parts of Japan. Cicadas can seldom be seen but can always be heard in the summer. As Shiiba has a number of rivers, waterfalls and reservoirs, a number of frogs and toads can be seen around the town during the summer months. As with cicadas they can often be heard more than seen. However, during the rainy season they have been known to swarm across several roads en masse on their way to their breading grounds so care should be taken.

=== Neighbouring municipalities ===
Kumamoto Prefecture

- Kizukami
- Yamato
- Yatsushiro

Miyazaki Prefecture

- Gokase
- Misato
- Morotsuka
- Nishimera
- Saito

== Climate ==
The winters can be very cold, especially in the Okawachi area, with heavy snowfall and subzero temperatures. Although it changes slightly every year, it annually snows from the period starting from mid to late December until February. During this time most locals have to change their car tires to ones equipped with stronger treading (snow tires). This reduces the chance of slipping on the roads and makes it easier to drive up the more hilly, steep and occasionally exposed roads in the region. In summer Shiiba has high humidity and regular rains as result of the typhoon season. But, due to its central location within Kyushu, Shiiba tends to be protected by the surrounding mountain ranges and is relatively unaffected for the most part. However like many mountainous regions of Japan landslides have been known to occur, and during the period care should be taken as rivers and dams will be swollen. For most of the year Shiiba is relatively a cool compared to other parts of Miyazaki and Kyushu. This is directly due to its location in Kyushu, the slightly higher altitude, and the surrounding mountains and forests which keep it sheltered.

== Demographics ==
Per Japanese census data, the population of Shiiba has declined over the past 60 years.

Historical population
Year	Pop.	±%
1920	9,495	—
1930	8,795	−7.4%
1940	11,463	+30.3%
1950	9,310	−18.8%
1960	10,879	+16.9%
1970	7,616	−30.0%
1980	5,478	−28.1%
1990	4,611	−15.8%
2000	3,769	−18.3%
2010	3,092	−18.0%
2020	2,503	−19.0%
Shiiba population statistics

== History ==
The area of Misato was part of ancient Hyūga Province. According to local legend, the area was settled by survivors of the Heike clan following their defeat at the Battle of Dan-no-ura in the Genpei War. The Kamakura shogunate dispatched Nasu Munehisa in 1191 to root out the remnants of the clan. Seeing no remaining threat from the Heike, he returned home, leaving behind an illegitimate son who took the "Nasu" family name, and whose descendants became local warlords who ruled the area into the Sengoku period. The territory was hotly contested in the wars of the Sengoku period between the Shimazu clan and other local warlords, eventually becoming part of Hitoyoshi Domain of Higo Province under the Tokugawa shogunate. The village of Shiiba within Nishiusuki District, Miyazaki was established on April 1, 1889 with the creation of the modern municipalities system. It was transferred to Higashiusuki District, Miyazaki in 1949.

== Government ==
Shiiba has a mayor-council form of government with a directly elected mayor and a unicameral village council of 10 members. Shiiba, collectively with the village of Morotsuka and towns of Misato and Kadogawa contributes one member to the Miyazaki Prefectural Assembly. In terms of national politics, the town is part of the Miyazaki 2nd district of the lower house of the Diet of Japan.

== Economy ==
Shiiba has an economy based overwhelmingly on agriculture and forestry.

== Education ==
Education in Shiiba is regulated by the Shiiba Village Board of Education (教育委員会 - kyouikuiinkai'). As a result of the declining population, a few of the local schools have been closed over the years. At present there are 6 primary schools and 1 main secondary school: The village does not have a high school.

=== Primary schools ===
- Fudono Primary School (不土野小学校)
- Kozaki Primary School (小崎小学校)
- Matsuo Primary School (松尾小学校)
- Okawauchi Primary School (大河内小学校)
- Omukai Primary School (尾向小学校)
- Shiiba Primary School (椎葉小学校)

=== Secondary schools ===
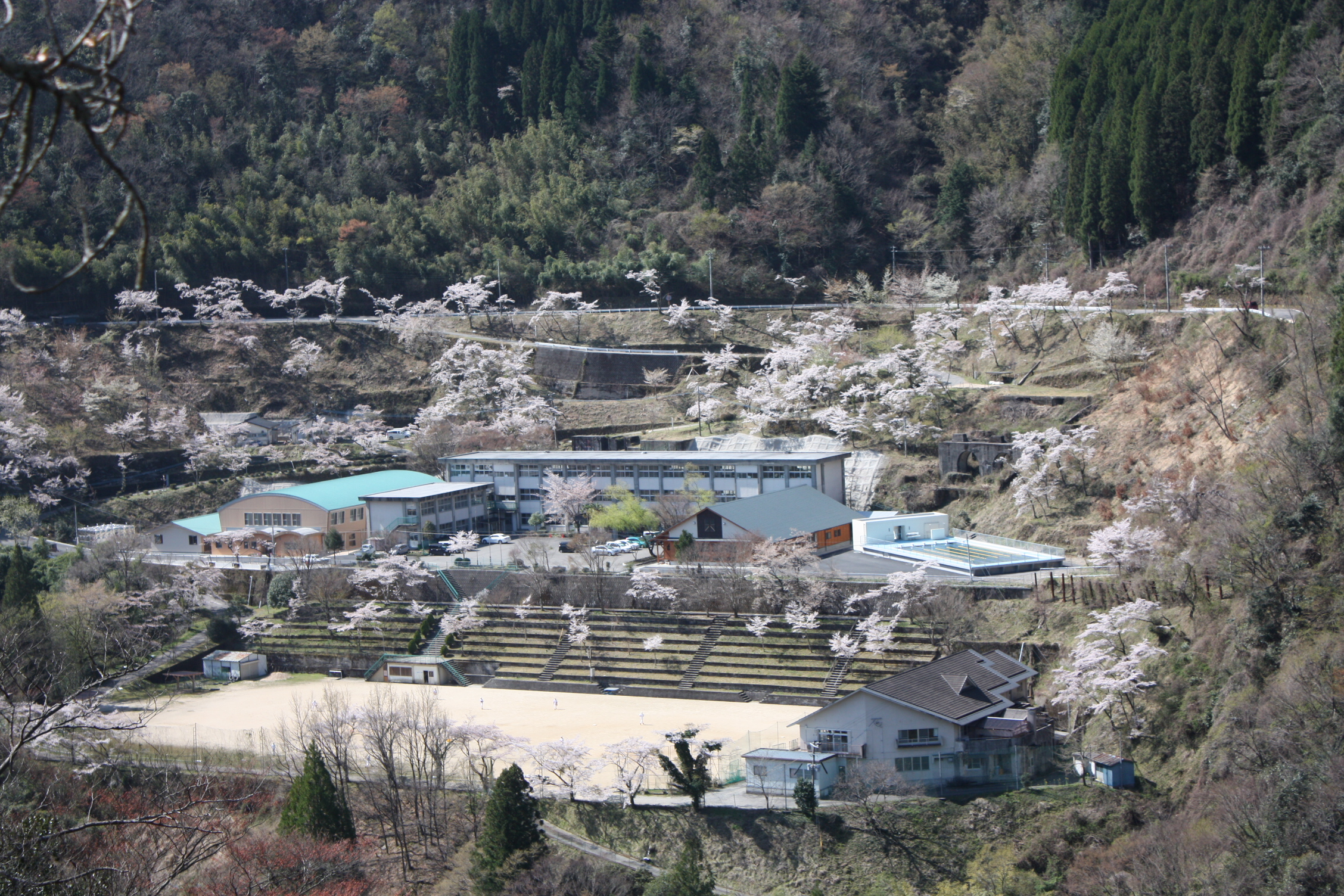
Shiiba Secondary School

The only secondary school in Shiiba is Shiiba Secondary School (椎葉中学校). Another secondary school, Matsuo Secondary School (松尾中学校) closed in spring 2013. Students from Matsuo Elementary School initially went straight to Matsuo Junior High School upon graduation. However, due its closure in the spring of 2013, all students in the region graduate to Shiiba Junior High school (This is now the main and only secondary school in Shiiba).

As there are no high schools in Shiiba, students are required to study at high schools in other parts of Miyazaki prefecture upon graduation.

Despite its remote location Shiiba is not internationally isolated and has had a longterm reciprocal exchange program with a sister school in Singapore. All the final year secondary school students travel to Singapore each year during the summer holidays (August) as part of an international cultural exchange and homestay programme. This is then reciprocated in the winter (November–December) when students from Singapore travel to Shiiba. Due to the small size and close-knit nature of the community this is a town event, with the exchange often timed to coincide with local traditional festivals or events, such as Kagura or harvest festivals. The programme is unique, with few comparable programs in Japan, in part to the extent of local support and its structure allowing all students from Shiiba a chance experience foreign culture and the chance to forge strong friendship with people of their own age in a different country. It is an event that most students look forward to one day participating in.

== Transportation ==
As there are no train stations and only a very limited bus service from Hyuga, it is predominantly accessible by car; the village is several hours drive from both Miyazaki City (3~4hrs) and Kumamoto City (2~3hrs). If travelling from Fukuoka or Kagoshima it is accessed from the West via Gokase (30~50 minute drive) on the Miyazaki-Kumamoto border, or via the main road from the coastal town of Hyuga (90~110 minute drive) if travelling from the East. Though it is possible to travel through Okawachi via Hitoyoshi, the road is unclearly signed from hotspring town of Yunomae and care needs to be taken for rockfall and road closure during certain times of the year.

=== Railways ===
Shiiba has no passenger rail service. The nearest train station is Hyūgashi on the JR Kyushu Nippō Main Line

=== Highways ===
- National Route 265
- National Route 327
- National Route 388
- National Route 466

== Local attractions ==
=== Heike Festival ===
The village, despite being small, has a long and deep history. Every year, during early to mid November, the locals are joined by hundreds of people from other parts of the country to celebrate the Shiiba Heike Matsuri. This festival celebrates a legendary tragic love affair that took place between two members of rival samurai families in the area over 800 years ago. This celebration is of a secret love between the Heike clan's Princess, Tsurutomi, and Nasu Daihachiro, a member of the Genji clan who had been given orders to destroy the Heike clan. It takes place over 3 days (Friday evening and the following Saturday and Sunday) and includes a number of special events and performances accompanied with food and souvenir stalls with the main attraction being the Heike Parade. Over 300 people participate in the parade with many local men and boys dressing up in samurai armour walking in line with Nasu Daihachiro, and the local women and girls dressing up as Heike maidens surrounding and following the Princess Tsurutomi. The roles for Princess Tsurutomi and Nasu Daihchiro are selected in the months before the parade by the village office. Many of the local school students and teachers, village officials and residents participate in the parade making it the starring attraction. The Heike Parade has been preceded in recent years by the talented, Kyushu famous, orchestra from Miyazaki Gakuen.

The town's cartoon style mascot, Otsuru-chan (おつるちゃん), is based on Princess Tsurutomi.

=== Outdoor activities ===
Aside from the many hillwalking and hiking trails that cover the mountains around Shiiba, climbing, especially ice climbing in winter, has become popular; with climbers around Kyushu travelling to Shiiba due to the consistent subzero temperates and many frozen waterfalls to be found around the region. Along with hiking, camping is also popular, with camping and log cabins in the area available during the warmer months, as well as several guesthouses offering nature retreats.

== Books ==
- Shiiba Kuniko: Living in the mountains with Kuniko Obaba (2013) ISBN 4872906373
