= Higashiusuki District, Miyazaki =

District in Miyazaki prefecture, Japan

Coordinates: 32.462°N 131.323°E

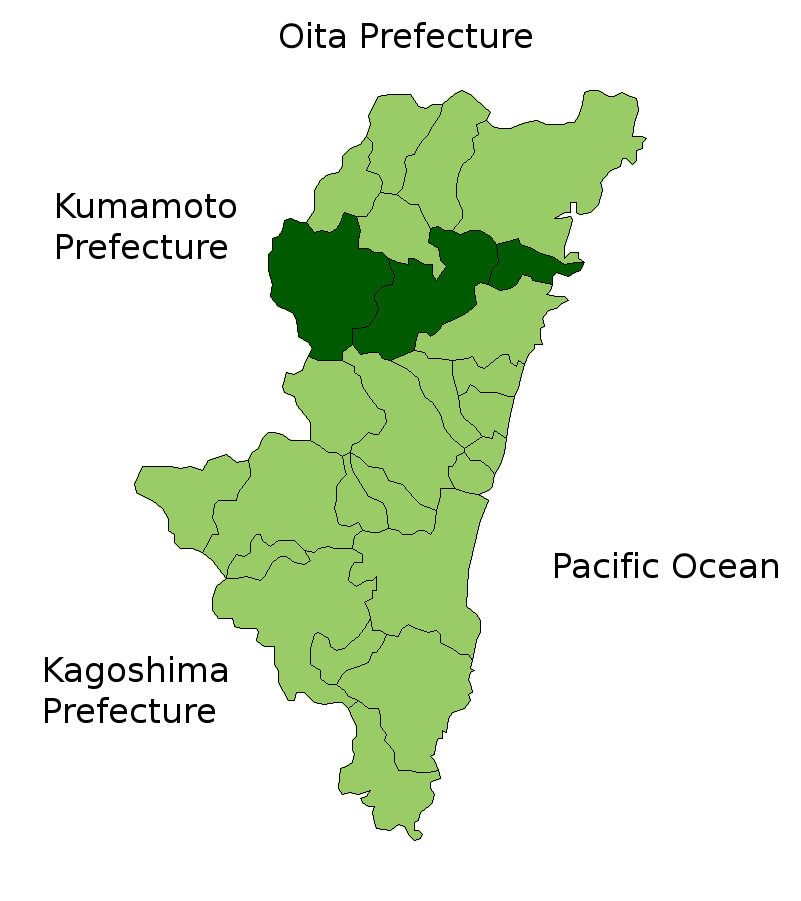
Higashiusuki District in Miyazaki Prefecture

Higashiusuki (東臼杵郡, Higashiusuki-gun) is a district located in Miyazaki Prefecture, Japan.

As of October 1, 2019, the district has an estimated population of 26,460 and the density of 20.4 persons per km^{2}. The total area is 1,294.21 km^{2}.

== History ==
=== History since the establishment of the county ===
- January 26, 1884 - Usuki County becomes Higashiusuki District. The county office is set up in Okatomi. (3 towns and 53 villages)
- May 1, 1889 - New towns and villages system is established, the following towns and villages were established. (2 towns and 16 villages)
  - Nobeoka Town ← Nobeoka Castle, Okatomi Village, Funakura Town (now Nobeoka City)
  - Okatomi Village ← Okatomi Village, Hozaijima Village (now Nobeoka City)
  - Tsunetomi ← Misu, Tsunetomi, Dekitamura (now Nobeoka)
  - Igata Village ← Akamizu Village, Taina Village, Kushizu Tororo Village, Ifukugata Village (now Nobeoka City)
  - Kadokawa Village ← Kadokawa Oue Village, Kawauchi Village, Kakusa Village, Angawa Village (now Kadokawa Town)
  - Hososhima Town (now Hyuga City)
  - Tomitaka Village ← Zaikoji Village, Shiomi Village, Tomitaka Village, Hichiya Village (now Hyuga City)
  - Iwawaki ← Koyukiwaki, Hiraiwa (now Hyuga City)
  - Togo Village ← San'in Village, Yaehara Sakonouchi Village, Tsuboya Village, Shimosanka Village (now Hyuga City)
  - Nango Village ← Uedagawa Village, Nakatogawa Village, Oni Jinno Village, Kammon Village, Mizuseiya Village (now Misato Town)
  - Saigo Village ← Yamasanga Village, Ohara Village, Tashiro Village, Tateishi Village (now Misato Town)
  - Kitago Village ← Unama Village, Irishita Village, Kuroki Village (now Misato Town)
  - Kitakata Village (now Nobeoka City)
  - Minakata Village ← Miwa Village, Minakata Village, Onuki Village (now Nobeoka City)
  - Tokai Village ← Daitake Town, Awana Village, Inabazaki Village, Kaiko Village, Kawashima Village (now Nobeoka City)
  - Kitagawa Village ← Kawauchi Namura, Nagai Village (now Nobeoka City)
  - Minamiura ← Urajiri, Sugae, Kumanoe, Shimanoura (now Nobeoka)
  - Kitaura ← Furue, Ichimura, Miyanoura, Mikawauchi (now Nobeoka)
- April 1, 1897 - County system enforced.
- October 1, 1921 - Tomitaka village becomes the town of Tomitaka by through the town system. (3 towns and 15 villages)
- April 1, 1923 - The county council is abolished. The county office remains.
- July 1, 1926 - The county government office is abolished. After that, it will be called Area Classification.
- April 1, 1930 - Nobeoka Town, Okatomi Village, Tsunetomi Village merged, Nobeoka Town was reestablished. (3 towns and 13 villages)
- February 11, 1933 - Nobeoka Town became the city of Nobeoka by through the city system and left the county. (2 towns and 13 villages)
- October 25, 1936 - Igata Village and Tokai-mura are incorporated into the city of Nobeoka. (3 towns and 10 villages)
- October 1, 1937 - Tomishima Town was reestablished through the merger of Tomitaka Town and Hososhima Town . (2 towns and 10 villages)
- April 1, 1949 - Nishiusuki district Morotsuka-shiiba changes counties. (2 towns and 12 villages)
- April 1, 1951 - Toshima and Iwawaki-mura merged to form the city of Hyuga, leaving the county. (1 town and 11 villages)
- April 1, 1955 - Minakata Village and Minamiura Village transferred to Nobeoka City. (1 town 9 villages)
- April 1, 1969- Togo Town becomes the township of Togo Town. (2 towns and 8 villages)
- January 11, 1972 - Kitagawa-mura becomes the town of Kitagawa through enforcement of the town system. Kitaura Village also becomes the town of Kitaura.
  - January 1, 2006 - Misato Town is established by the merger of Nango Village, Saigo Village, and Kitago Village. (6 towns and 2 villages)
  - February 20, 2006 - Kitakata and Kitaura are transferred to Nobeoka. (4 towns and 2 villages)
- February 25, 2006 - Togo Town is incorporated into Hyuga City. (3 towns and 2 villages)
- March 31, 2007 - The town of Kitagawa is incorporated into Nobeoka. (2 towns and 2 villages)

== Towns and villages ==
- Kadogawa
- Misato
- Morotsuka
- Shiiba
