= Nobeoka Castle =

Castle in Miyazaki, Japan

Coordinates: 32°34′50″N 131°39′47″E

- 延岡城
- Nobeoka, Miyazaki Prefecture, Japan
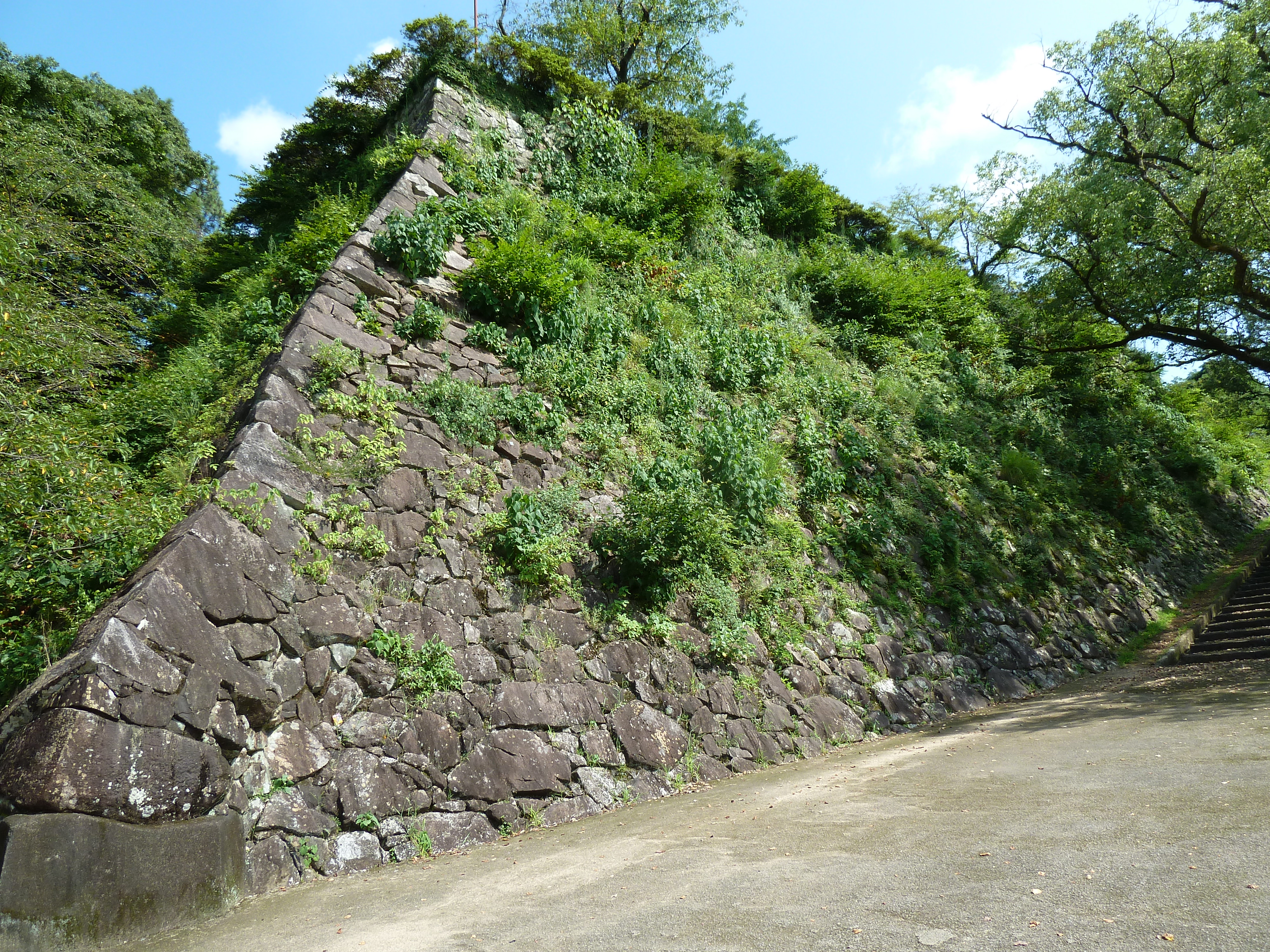
- Stone wall called Sennin Goroshi in the Ninomaru compound of Nobeoka castle

Site information
- Type: Hirajiro-style castle
- Owner: Takahashi clan, Arima clan, Miura clan, Makino clan, Naito clan
- Condition: ruins

Site history
- Built: 1603
- Built by: Takahashi Mototane
- Demolished: 1870

Nobeoka Castle (延岡城, Nobeoka-jō) is the remains of a castle structure in Nobeoka, Miyazaki Prefecture, Japan.

After the battle of Sekigahara, Takahashi Mototane started building the castle. In 1655, Arima clan fortified the castle and built a 3 level main keep. However, it was burnt down by a fire in 1683 and was never rebuilt.

The castle is now only ruins, just some remnants of water moats and stone walls. Nobeoka castle was listed as one of the Continued Top 100 Japanese Castles in 2017.

== Gallery ==
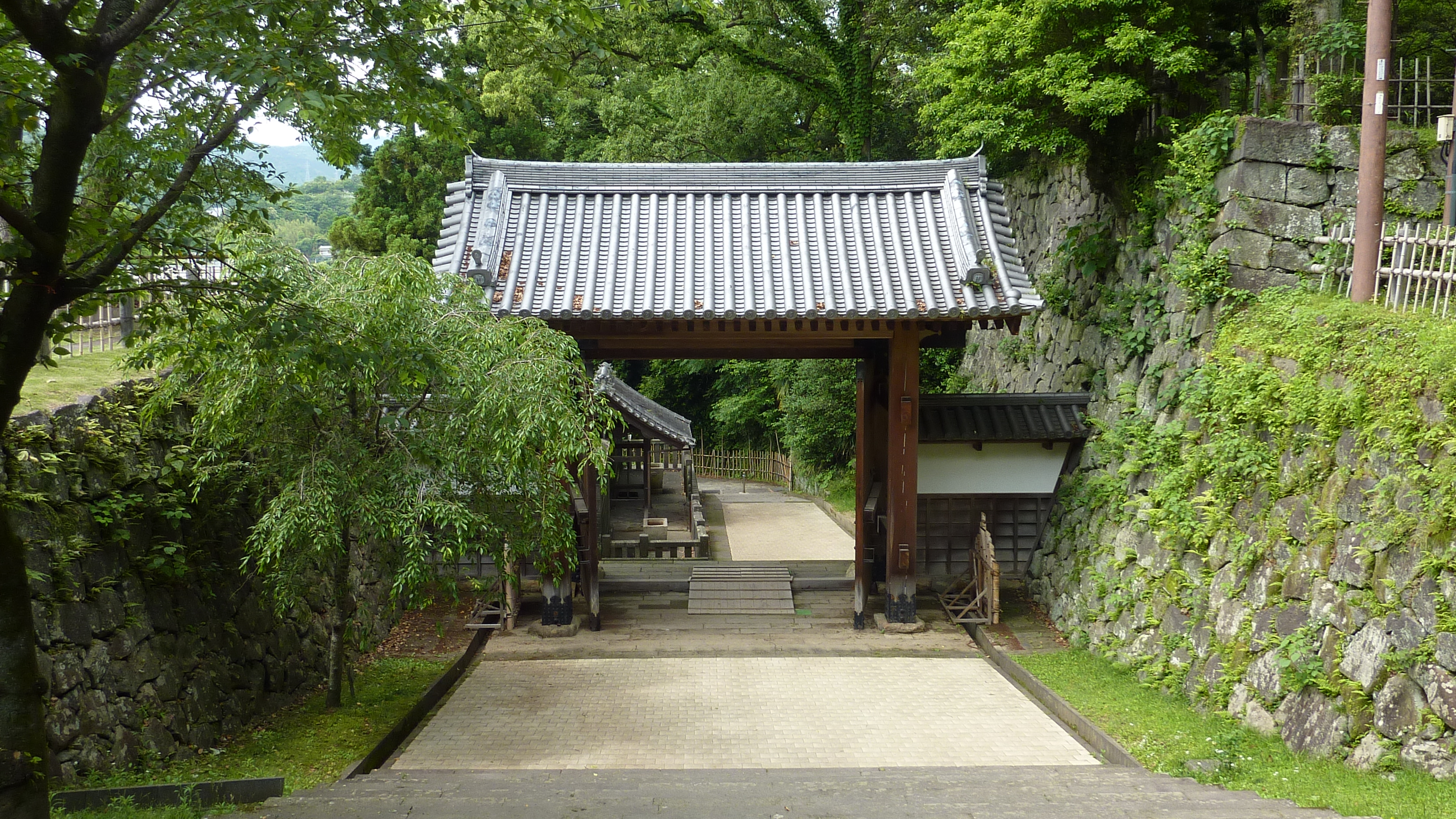
Reconstructed gate of Nobeoka Castle

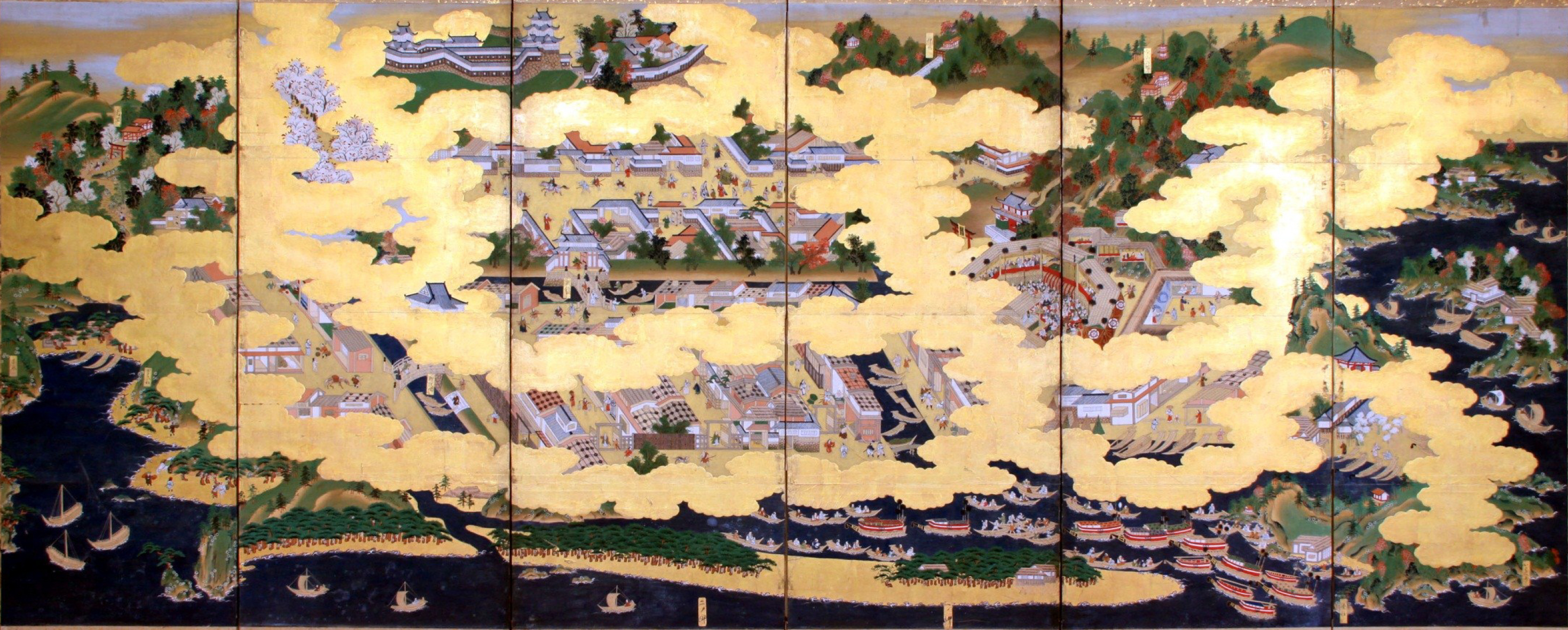
Scenes around Nobeoka Castle in the Edo period

== Literature ==
- De Lange, William (2021). An Encyclopedia of Japanese Castles. Groningen: Toyo Press. pp. 600 pages. ISBN 978-9492722300.
