= Nobeoka Domain =

Administrative division in Japan during the Edo period (1601–1871)

Nobeoka Domain 延岡藩
- Domain of Japan
- 1587–1871
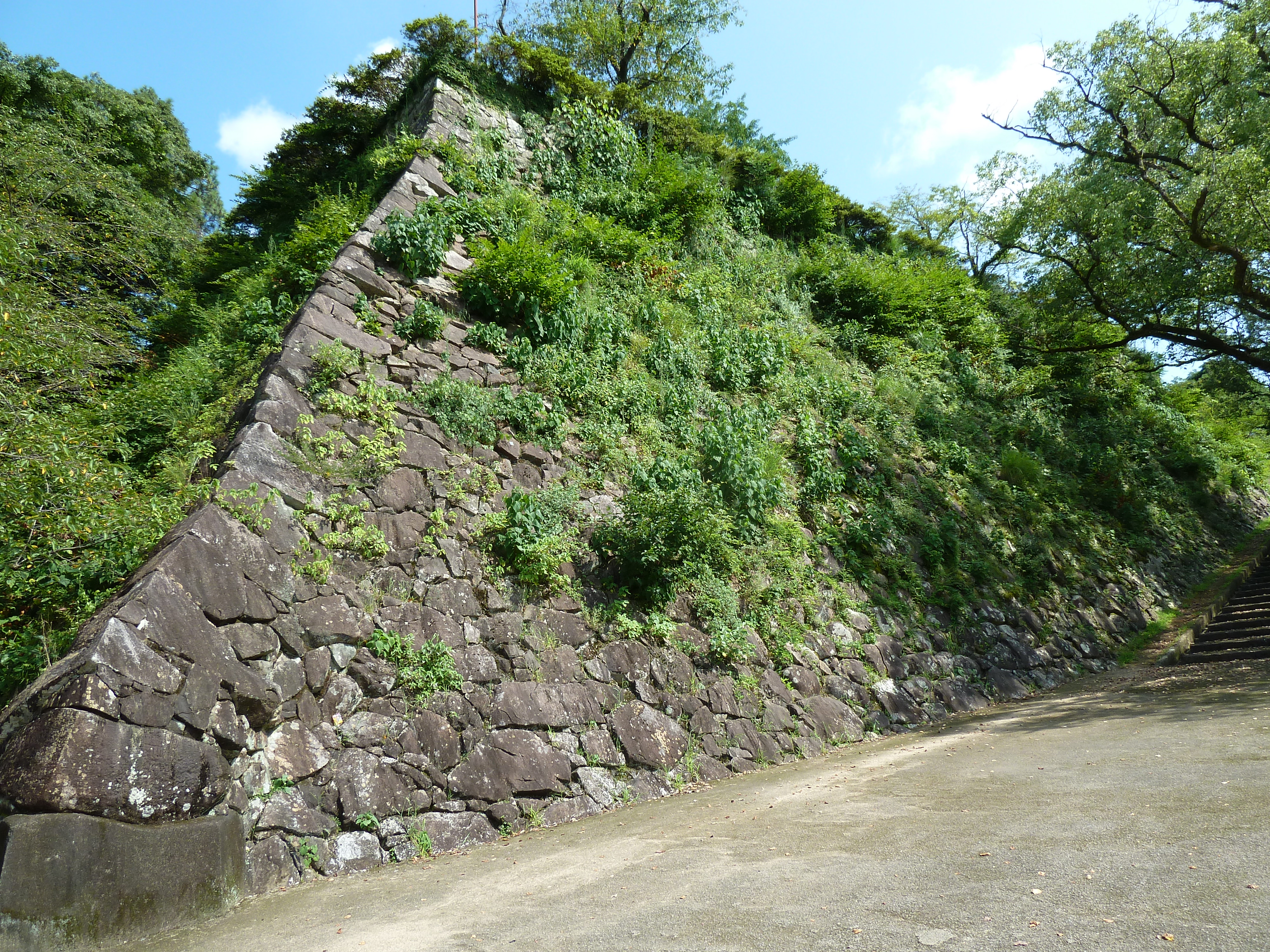
- Nobeoka Castle stone walls

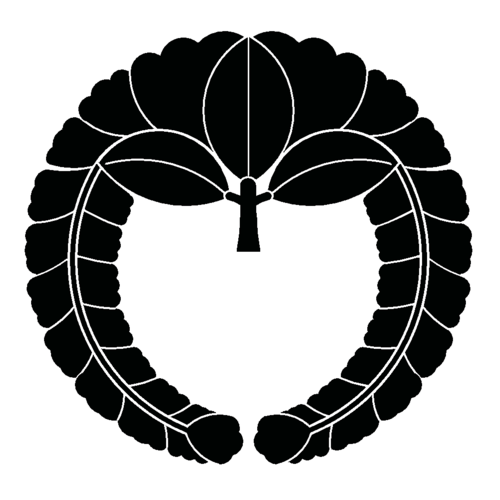
- Mon of the Naito clan
- Capital: Nobeoka Castle
- Area
  - Coordinates: 32°34′50″N 131°39′46.7″E
- Historical era: Edo period
  - Established: 1587
  - Abolition of the han system: 1871
- Contained within
  - Province: Hyūga Province
- Today part of: Miyazaki Prefecture

Location of Nobeoka Castle
Nobeoka Domain (Japan)

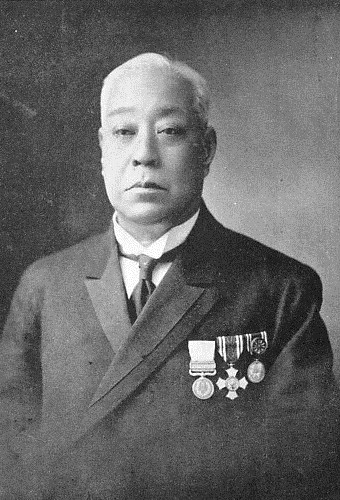
Naito Masataka, final daimyō of Nobeoka Domain

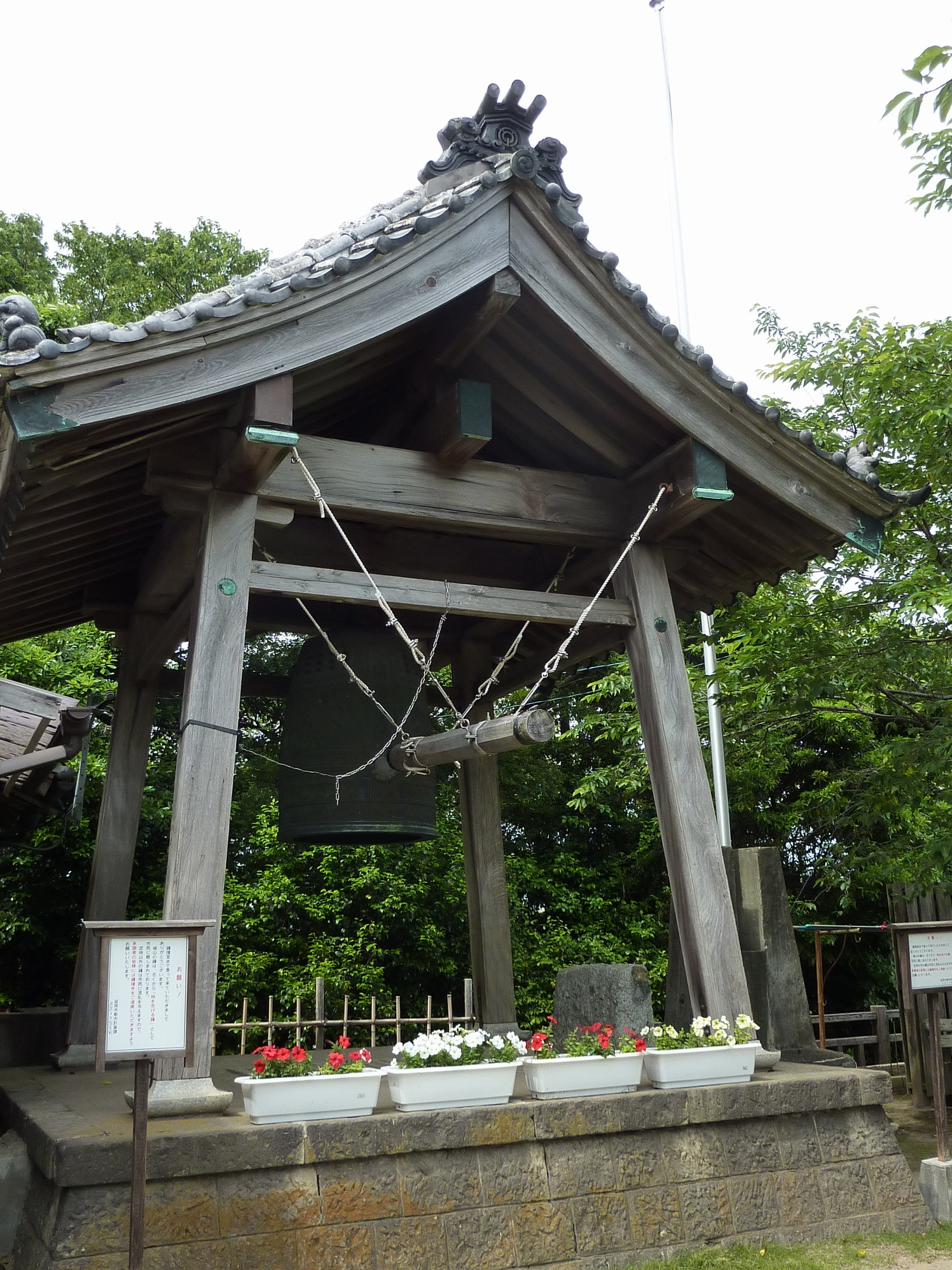
Temple bell of Shiroyama Nobeoka

Nobeoka Domain (延岡藩, Nobeoka-han) was a feudal domain under the Tokugawa shogunate of Edo period Japan, in what is now central Miyazaki Prefecture. It was centered around Nobeoka Castle in what is now the city of Nobeoka, Miyazaki and was ruled by the fudai daimyō Naitō clan for much of its later of its history. In its early history, it was called Agata Domain (縣藩, Agata-han)

== History ==
The start of Nabeoka Domain can be traced to Toyotomi Hideyoshi's conquest of Kyūshū, when Takahashi Mototane of Buzen Province conquered a 50,000 koku territory centered around Matsuo Castle in southern Nobeoka. In the 1600 Battle of Sekigahara, he defected with a coalition of smaller feudal lords in southern Kyushu to the Eastern Army, and as a result was confirmed in his holdings under the new Tokugawa shogunate. In 1601 he constructed Agata Castle, which was later renamed Nobeoka Castle. However, he fell foul of the shogunate's politics in 1613 and was relieved of his territory. In his place, the shogunate transferred Arima Naozumi from Hinoe Domain in Hizen Province. Under the rule of his son Arima Yasuzumi, the castle town was redeveloped into its present layout and the castle was repaired. In June 1656 he donated a bell to the Imayama Hachimangu Shrine, which is the first written inscription of the name "Nobeoka" in place of "Agata". He also reduced the domain by 3,000 koku by establishing his younger brother as head of a cadet house. The third Arima daimyō, Kiyozumi, further reduced the domain by 1800 koku to his younger brother and another 1000 koku to his third brother. In 1690, there was a massive peasant uprising caused by the tyrannical practices of one of his local magistrates. The uprising lasted 11 months and was only resolved through direct intervention by the shogunate. As a result, Kiyozumi was demoted and transferred to Itoigawa Domain in Echigo Province with a reduction in status to 50,000 koku.

In 1692, the fudai daimyō Miura Akitaka was transferred to Nobeoka from Mibu Domain in Shimotsuke Province, but with a kokudaka of only 23,000 koku. He was the southernmost of the fudai daimyō . Despite his low kokudaka, he worked hard to settle the aftermath of the peasant uprisings, and to resolve boundary disputes with Takanabe Domain and Bungo Province that had continued for decades. he also appears to have resolved the problem of the large differential between the official kokudaka of the domain and its actual kokudaka. In 1712, he was transferred to Kariya Domain in Mikawa Province.

In his place, Makino Narinaka was transferred from Yoshida Domain in Mikawa Province with a kokudaka of 80,000 koku. His domain extended into Ōita District, Kunisaki District, and Hayami District in Bungo Province. His son, Makino Sadamichi, rose through the ranks of the shogunal administration to become Kyoto Shoshidai in 1742, and some 30,000 koku of his holdings were widely scattered across Kawachi, Ōmi, Tanba, and Mino Provinces. However, with the promotions to high office came high expenses and the domain was in constant fiscal arrears. In 1747, the Makino clan was transferred to Kasama Domain in Hitachi Province.

Nobeoka was then assigned to Naitō Masaki, who had been demoted from Iwakidaira Domain in Mutsu Province over a peasant revolt. His former holdings were 130,000 koku, but in Nobeoka he was allowed only 70,000 koku. The Naitō would continue to rule Nobeoka for eight generations and 124 years to the Meiji restoration. The Naitō clan's reign was plagued by financial difficulties and resulting uprisings, and the clan had a rare record of inheritance through adopted children as no male heirs lived to maturity. Successive feudal lords worked hard to reform the domain's administration, and in particular, the sixth daimyō, Masayori, forcibly confiscated the business privileges of merchants and strengthened the monopoly system. He focused his efforts on producing wax, Japanese paper, and rapeseed. The seventh daimyō, Masayoshi, was Ii Naosuke's half-brother, and was adopted from Hikone Domain. He rebuilt the han school Kōgyōkan.

During the Bakumatsu period, the domain had troops stationed in Osaka and was assigned security duties under orders from the shogunate due to the domain's position as a fudai domain. This resulted in the domain being declared an "enemy of the court" after the Battle of Toba-Fushimi, although the official position of the domain was to side with the new Meiji government. Satsuma Domain and Kumamoto Domain were asked to intercede on the domain's behalf, and Nobeoka received a pardon; albeit the Meiji government still did not fully trust Nobeoka and the domain forces were assigned only to rear guard duties for the rest of the Boshin War.

In 1871, Nobeoka Domain became Nobeoka Prefecture due to the abolition of the han system. Later, it was incorporated into Miyazaki Prefecture via "Mimitsu Prefecture", "Miyazaki Prefecture", and Kagoshima Prefecture. In 1884, the Naitō family was elevated to the kazoku peerage and became a viscount in 1884.

== Holdings at the end of the Edo period ==
As with most domains in the han system, Nobeoka Domain consisted of several discontinuous territories calculated to provide the assigned kokudaka, based on periodic cadastral surveys and projected agricultural yields.

- Hyūga Province
  - 63 villages in Usuki District
  - 24 villages in Miyazaki District
- Bungo Province
  - 32 villages in Kunisaki District
  - 16 villages in Hayami District
  - 36 villages in Oita District

== List of daimyō ==
#	Name	Tenure	Courtesy title	Court Rank	kokudaka
Takahashi clan, 1587–1613 (tozama daimyo)
1	Takahashi Mototane (高橋元種)	1587–1613	Ukon-no-taifu (右近大夫)	Junior 5th Rank, Lower Grade (従五位下)	50,000 koku
Arima clan, 1614–1691 (tozama daimyo)
1	Arima Naozumi (有馬直純)	1614–1641	Samon-no-suke (左衛門佐)	Junior 5th Rank, Lower Grade (従五位下)	53,000 koku
2	Arima Yasuzumi (有馬康純)	1641–1679	Samon-no-suke (左衛門佐)	Junior 5th Rank, Lower Grade (従五位下)	53,000 --> 50,000 koku
3	Arima Kiyozumi (有馬清純)	1679–1691	Samon-no-suke (左衛門佐)	Junior 5th Rank, Lower Grade (従五位下)	50,000 koku
Miura clan, 1692–1712 (Fudai daimyo)
1	Miura Akihiro (三浦明敬)	1692–1712	Iki-no-kami (壱岐守)	Junior 5th Rank, Lower Grade (従五位下)	23,000 koku
Makino clan, 1712–1747 (Fudai daimyo)
1	Makino Narinaka (牧野成央)	1712–1719	Bingo-no-kami (備後守)	Junior 5th Rank, Lower Grade (従五位下)	80,000 koku
2	Makino Sadamichi (牧野貞通)	1719–1747	Bingo-no-kami (備後守); Jijū (侍従)	Junior 4th Rank, Lower Grade (従四位下)	80,000 koku
Naitō clan, 1747–1871 (Fudai daimyo)
1	Naitō Masaki (内藤政樹)	1747–1756	Bingo-no-kami (備後守)	Junior 5th Rank, Lower Grade (従五位下)	70,000 koku
2	Naitō Masaaki (内藤政陽)	1756–1770	Noto-no-kami (能登守)	Junior 5th Rank, Lower Grade (従五位下)	70,000 koku
3	Naitō Masanobu (内藤政脩)	1770–1790	Bingo-no-kami (備後守)	Junior 5th Rank, Lower Grade (従五位下)	70,000 koku
4	Naitō Masatsugu (内藤政韶)	1790–1802	Noto-no-kami (能登守)	Junior 5th Rank, Lower Grade (従五位下)	70,000 koku
5	Naitō Masatomo (内藤政和)	1802–1806	Bingo-no-kami (備後守)	Junior 5th Rank, Lower Grade (従五位下)	70,000 koku
6	Naitō Masayori (内藤政順)	1806–1834	Bingo-no-kami (備後守)	Junior 5th Rank, Lower Grade (従五位下)	70,000 koku
7	Naitō Masayoshi (内藤政義)	1834–1862	Noto-no-kami (能登守)	Junior 5th Rank, Lower Grade (従五位下)	70,000 koku
8	Naitō Masataka (内藤政挙)	1862–1871	Bingo-no-kami (備後守)	Junior 5th Rank, Lower Grade (従五位下)	70,000 koku

== See also ==
- List of Han
- Abolition of the han system
