= Disani =

Nuristani goddess

- Other names: Dísëňi (NE Katë), Dízëňi (SE Katë), Dísëi (W Katë), Dísni (Prasuni), Dísën̆i (Waigali)
- Associate: Nuristani people
- Gender: Female

Equivalents
- Hindu: Dhisana, Ushas
- Japanese: Amaterasu, Ame-no-Uzume

Disani (Northeastern Katë: Dísëňi, Southeastern Katë: Dízëňi, Western Katë: Dísëi, Prasuni: Dísni, Waigali: Dísën̆i) was a goddess of the Nuristani people before their conversion to Islam. To the people of Nuristan, she was depicted as living in the terrestrial world, appearing in the shape of a woman with a golden garland. Milk and milk-products were offered to her at the altar on the hillside.

== Etymology ==
The etymology of Disani is somewhat unclear. It was loaned into Prasuni from Katë, as *d regularly becomes l in Prasuni. In Ashkun, the cognate term däsäṇī means "ogress". It has been theorized by others, such as Georg Morgenstierne, that the word is cognate with the Vedic Sanskrit term Dhiṣáṇā, via a preform *Dhiṣanikā. It has also been etymologized by Nuristani speakers themselves as di "sky" + saňi "soldier", thence from *Devasenikā, though Morgenstierne and Strand regard this as folk etymology, but is accepted by Halfmann.

== Role in religion ==
Disani is featured in a religion found among the Kati and Prasun peoples. The various Nuristani deities (including Disani) march up to a house near heaven, where demons live. She is told by the deities to sow seeds after they unsuccessfully try to shoot the house down with arrows. The seeds ripen quickly and the chaff, visible in white, attaches itself to the thread (compare shimenawa in the Iwato myth). Later, she tells Moni to look at her thighs, which are white and full. Moni gets excited, breaks the door and kills the demons.

This story is reminiscent of the Vedic variant of the Vala and the Japanese variant of the Amano-Iwato, suggesting a common Proto-Indo-Iranian origin. Her attributes recall those of the Vedic Ushas and Japanese Ame-no-Uzume, who perform similar feats.

== See also ==
- Ushas
- Amaterasu
- Ame-no-Uzume
