= Kushifuru Shrine =

Shinto shrine in Miyazaki Prefecture, Japan

Kushifuru-jinja 槵觸神社
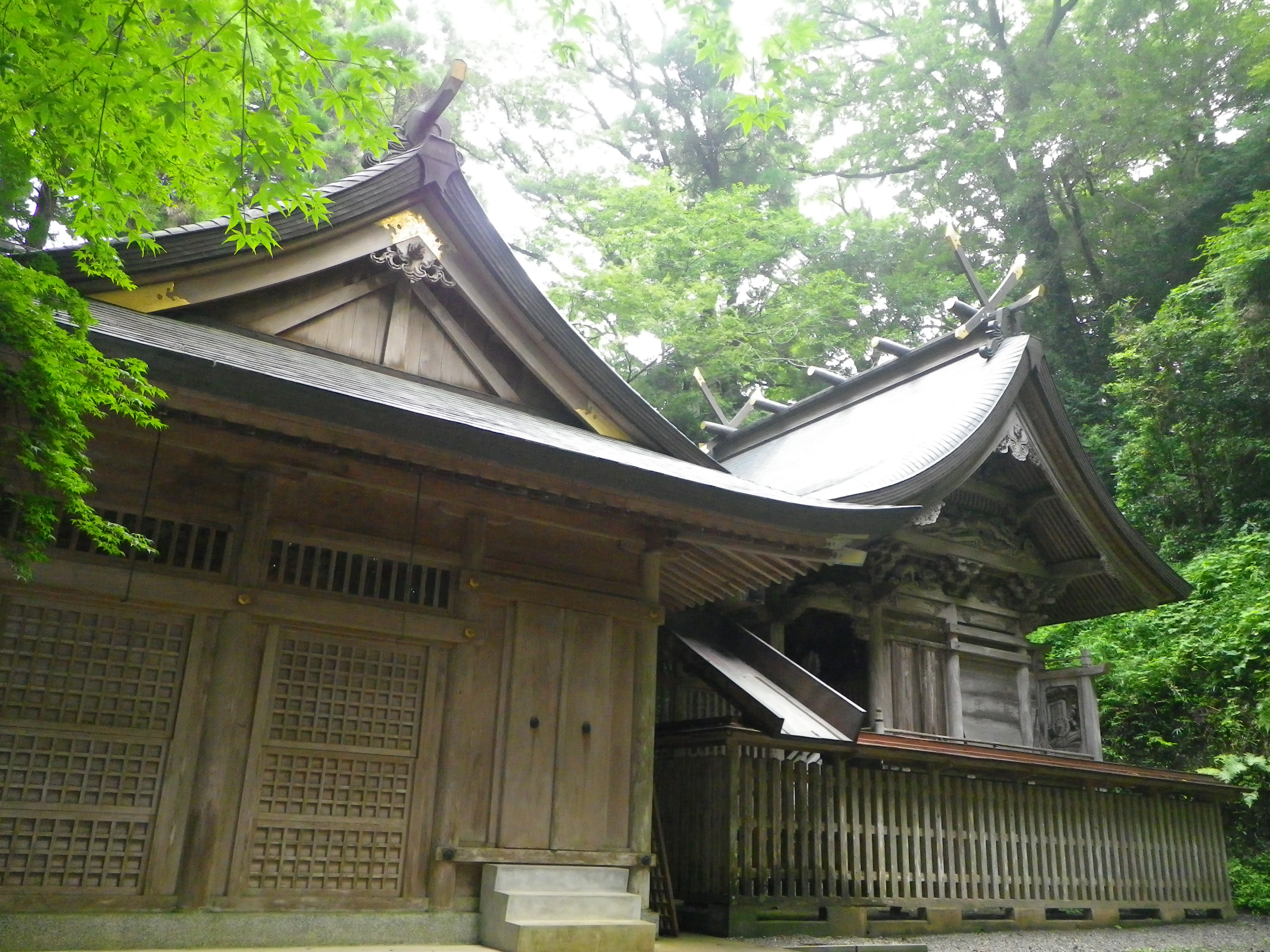

- Location within Japan

Religion
- Affiliation: Shinto
- Deity: Ninigi-no-Mikoto

Location
- Location: 713, Mitai, Takachiho; Nishiusuki District; Miyazaki 882-1101
- Interactive map of Kushifuru-jinja 槵觸神社
- Coordinates: 32°42′36.1″N 131°18′56.1″E

Kushifuru-jinja (槵觸神社) is a Shinto shrine located in Takachiho, Miyazaki prefecture, Japan. It is dedicated to Ninigi-no-Mikoto.
