= Shonenji Temple, Takachiho =

Buddhist temple in Miyazaki Prefecture, Japan

Coordinates: 32°45′39.45″N 131°16′47.29″E

Shonen-ji
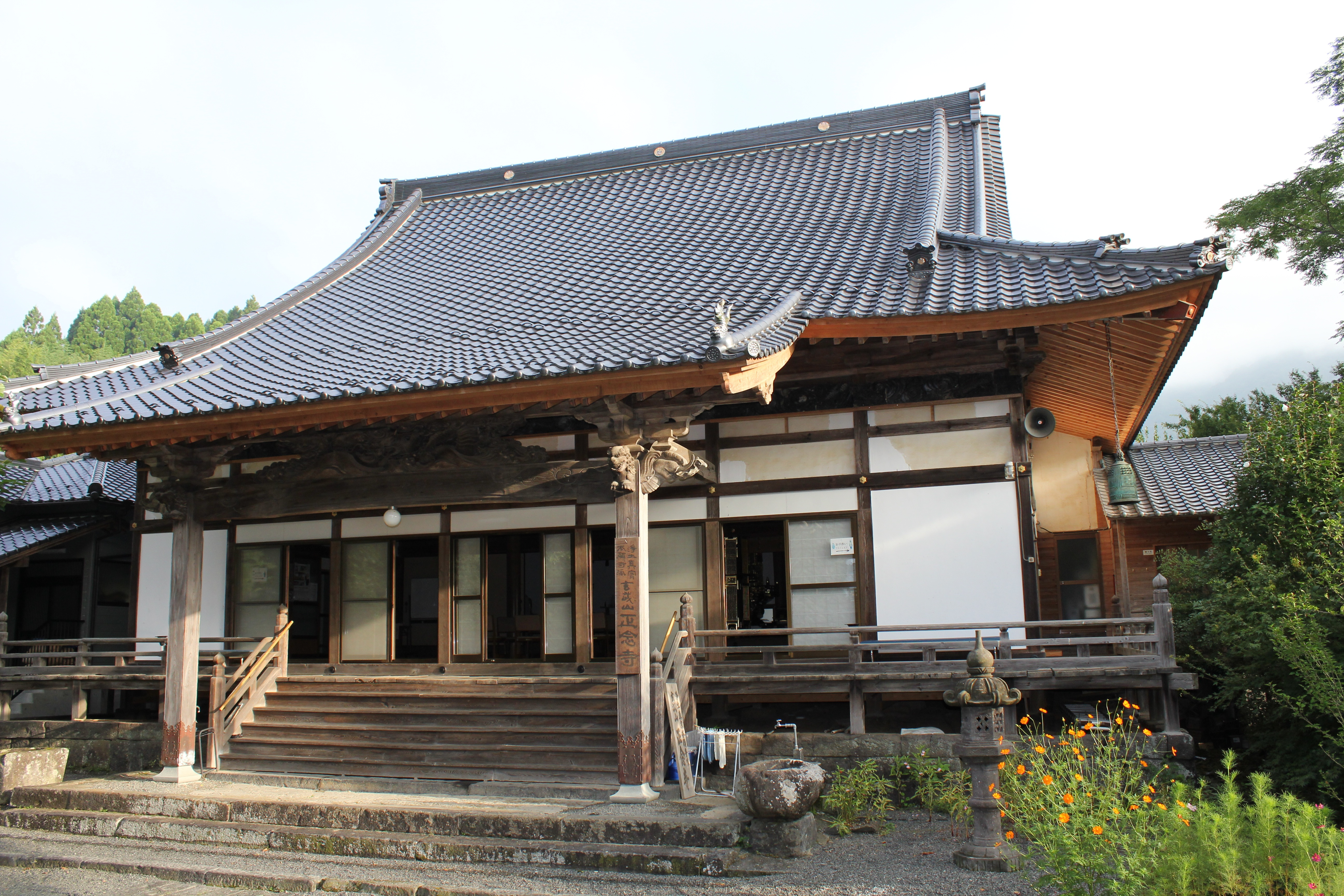

Religion
- Affiliation: Jōdo Shinshū

Location
- Location: Kamino 2771, Takachiho-chō, Nishiusuki-gun, Miyazaki 882-1411
- Country: Japan
- Interactive map of Shonen-ji

Architecture
- Founder: Tanio Yoshimura
- Completed: 1578

Shonen-ji (正念寺, Temple of the Correct Nenbutsu) is a temple of the Jōdo Shinshū (Pure Land) school of Buddhism. It is located in Takachiho Town, Miyazaki, on Kyūshū, Japan's southernmost main island.

The Shonen-ji temple complex is situated at the base of Genbuzan mountain, about 12 km outside central Takachiho. It was established there in 1578 by Tanio Yoshimura following the destruction of Genbu-jo, the Yoshimura clan's castle. Genbu-jo was burned and the principal Yoshimura family members killed when the Christian daimyō, Ōtomo Sōrin, invaded from Bungo Province in the north. According to temple records, Tanio Yoshimura experienced a revelation following the loss of the castle and then committed himself and his successors to a religious life in atonement for the many deaths that had occurred.

In accordance with Jōdo Shinshū tradition, the position of head priest at Shonen-ji is hereditary through the eldest son. The present head priest, Junsho Yoshimura (b. 1958), is the seventeenth generation of his family to serve at Shonen-ji. Shonen-ji is unique (June 2011) among Japanese temples in that the English wife of the head priest is herself an ordained Kiyoshi (senior priest).

In May 2006, Shonen-ji established a branch temple in the Kishinoue section of central Takachiho. The Kishinoue Kaikan (see image below) includes a meeting hall, a mausoleum, and an English school.

== Principal buildings ==
=== Takachiho-cho ===
- A Shōrō-mon (鐘楼門, bell tower gate) stands at the main entrance to the temple. In 1978, a new bell was installed to mark the 400th anniversary of Shonen-ji's founding. The tower itself was rebuilt as a 3x2 ken (bay) structure in 1986.
- Shonen-ji's Hon-dō (本堂, main hall) measures 7x7 ken (bays). The hall has been destroyed by fire twice in its history. The present structure dates from the early 20th century.
- Nokotsu-dō (Mausoleum) 3x2 ken
- Kaikan (Meeting Hall). Opened in December 2000.
- Community Hall

=== Central Takachiho ===
- Kishinoue Kaikan (Branch temple, mausoleum, and English school) in the Kishinoue section of central Takachiho.

== Gallery ==
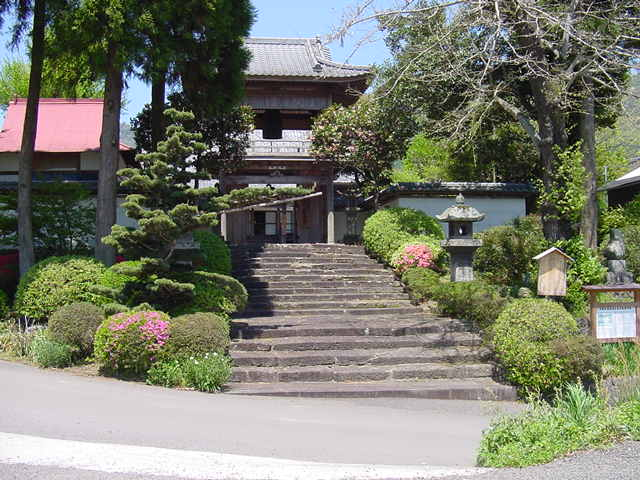
Shonen-ji's Main Entrance

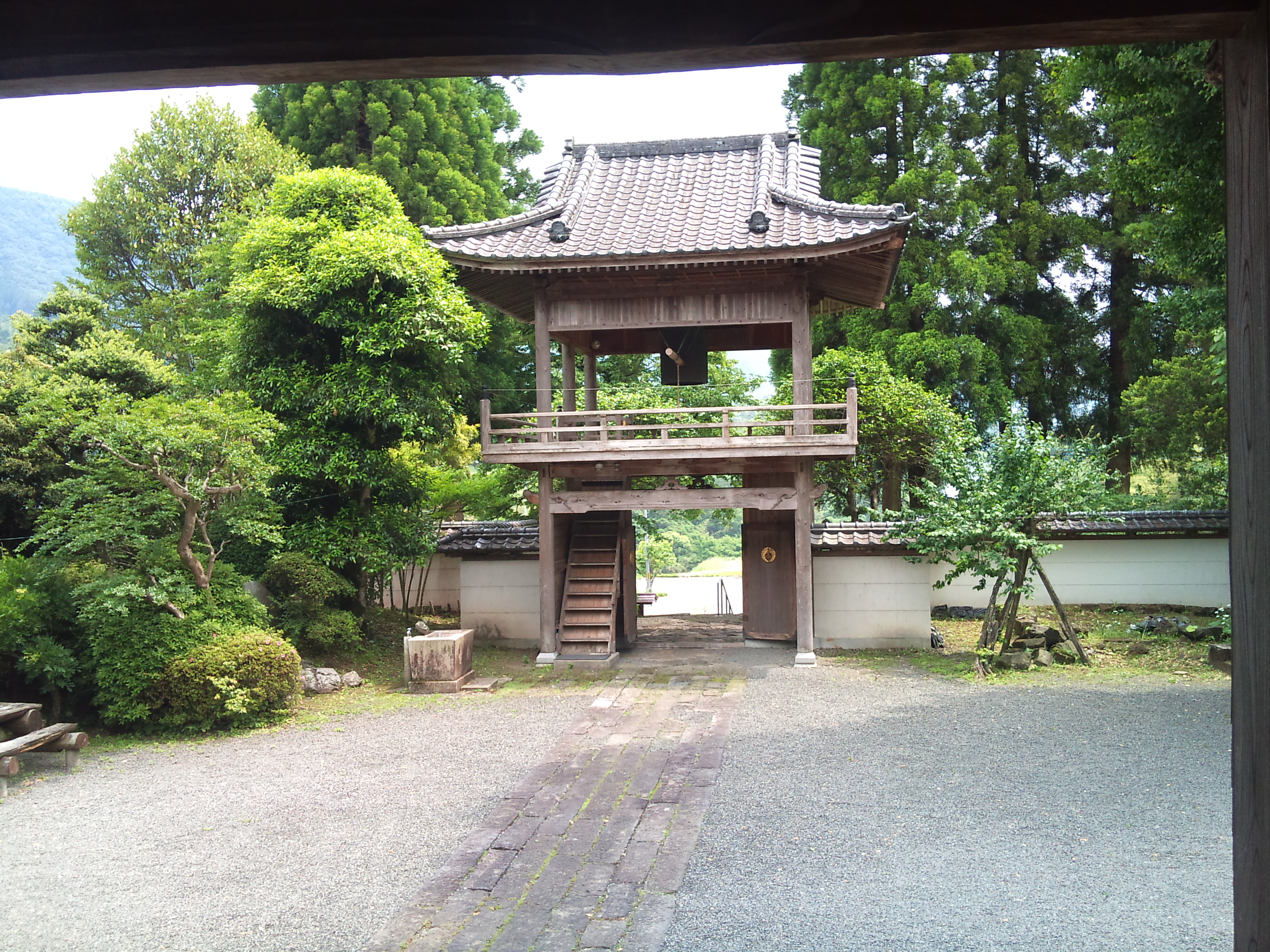
Shōrō-mon seen from the courtyard

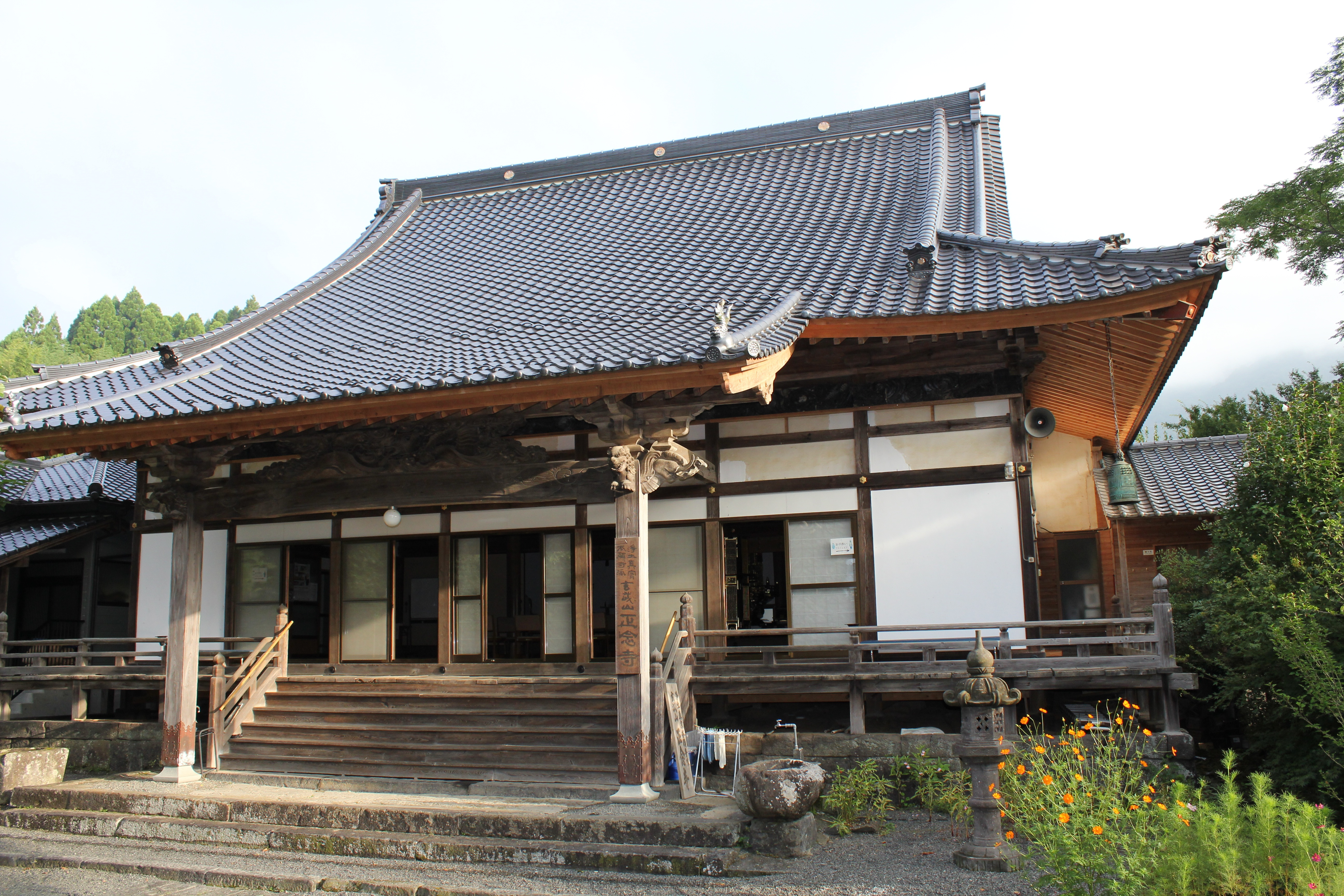
Shonen-ji Hon-dō (Main Hall)

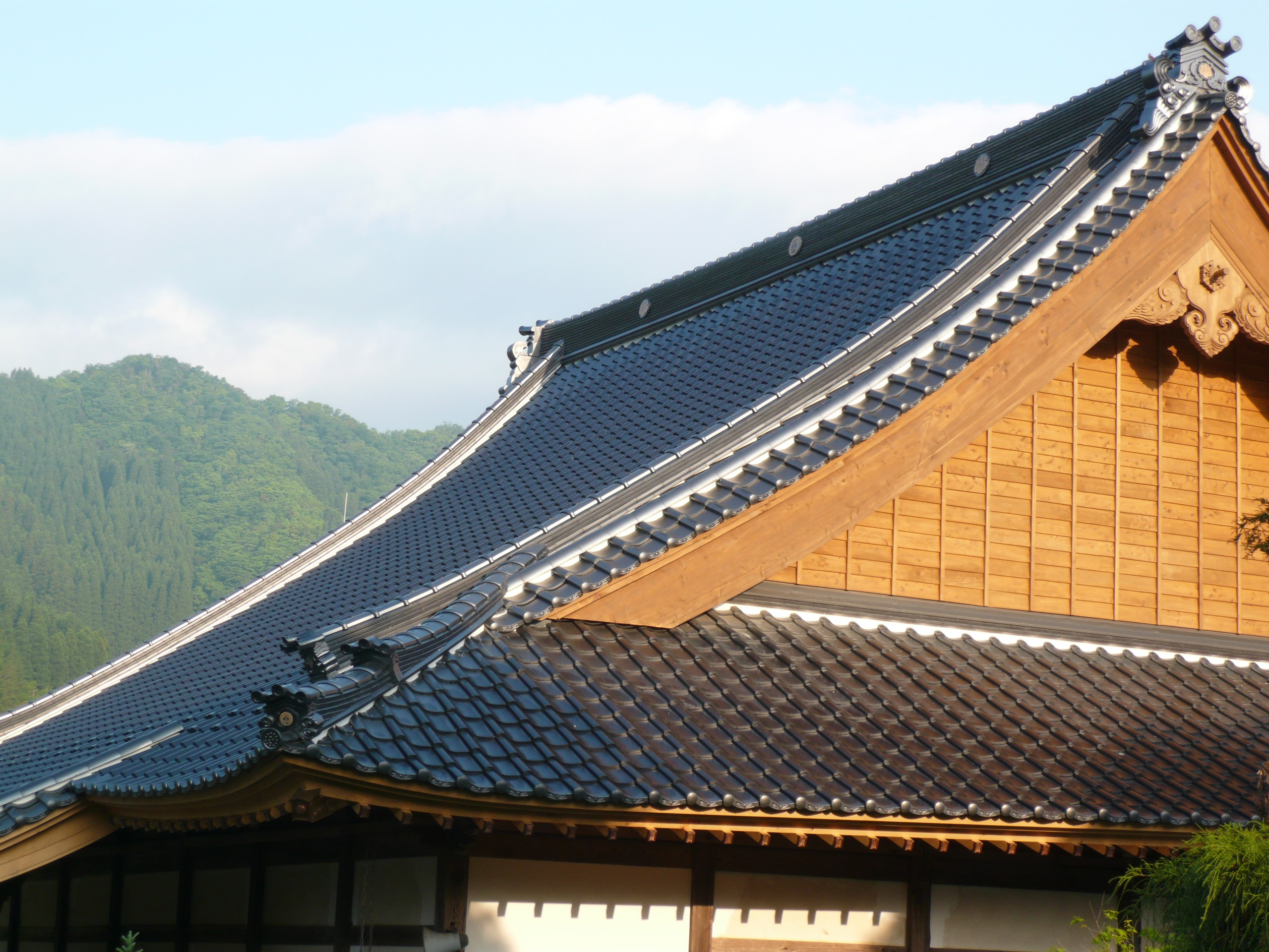
Main Hall (roof detail)

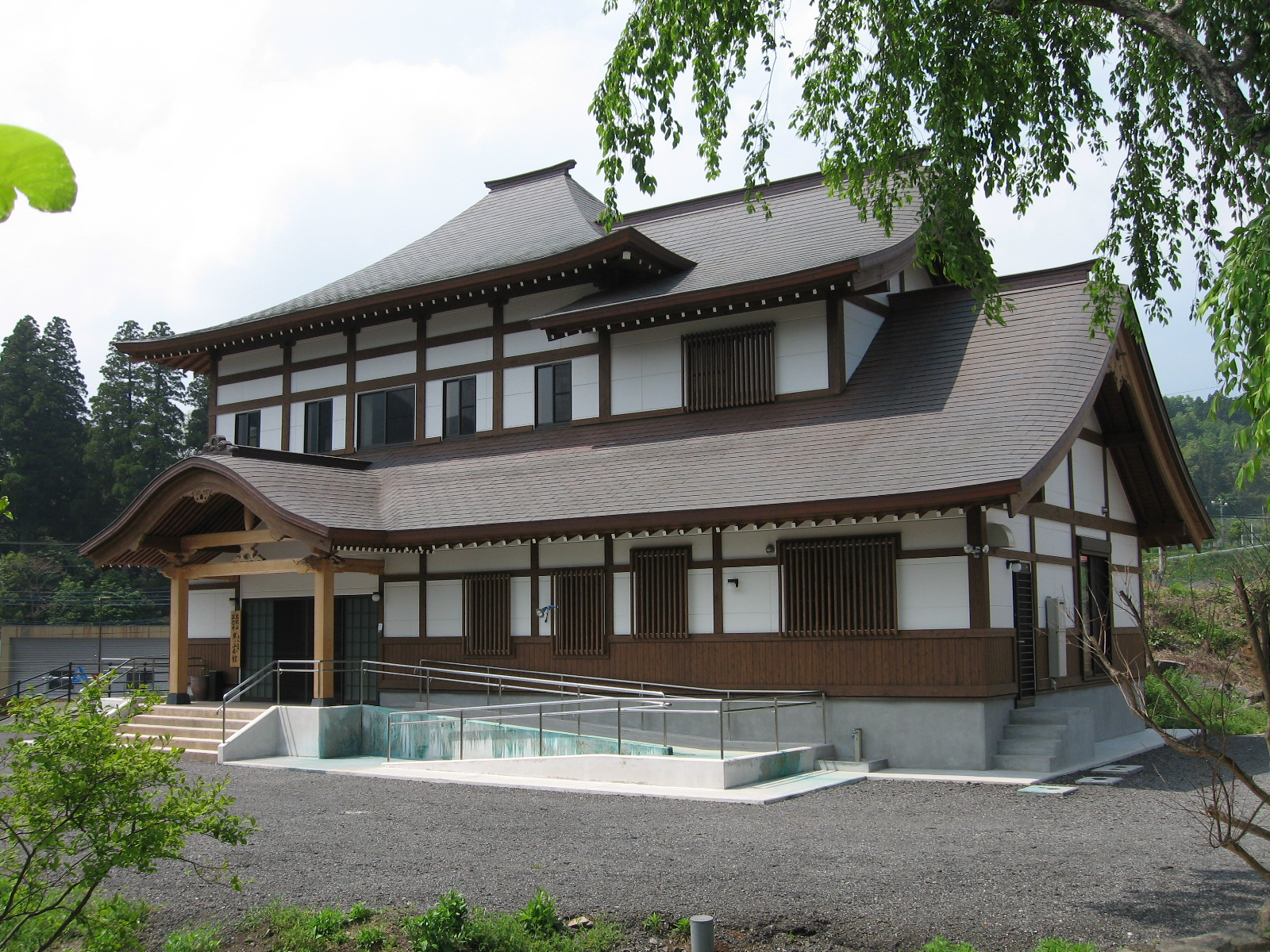
Shonen-ji Kishinoue Kaikan

== See also ==
- Takachiho Town
- Amanoiwato-jinja – Shinto shrine
