= Amanoiwato Shrine =

Shinto shrine in Miyazaki Prefecture, Japan

Amanoiwato-jinja 天岩戸神社
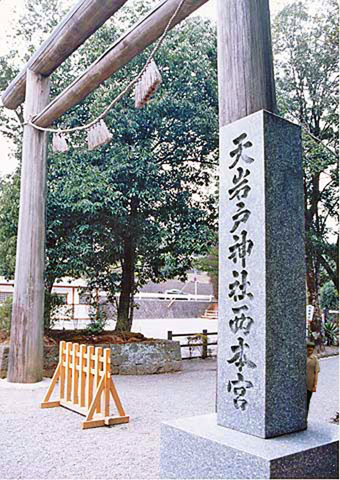
- Torii at Amanoiwato-jinja

- Location within Japan

Religion
- Affiliation: Shinto
- Deity: Amaterasu

Location
- Location: 1073-1, Iwato, Takachiho; Nishiusuki District; Miyazaki 882-1621
- Interactive map of Amanoiwato-jinja 天岩戸神社
- Coordinates: 32°44′04″N 131°21′02″E

Amanoiwato-jinja (天岩戸神社) is a Shinto shrine located in Takachiho, Miyazaki Prefecture, Japan. It is dedicated to the sun goddess Amaterasu and sits above the gorge containing Ama-no-Iwato, the cave where, according to Japanese legend, the goddess hid after battle with her brother, plunging the world into darkness until lured out by the spirit of merriment Ame-no-Uzume.

The Amano-Iwato cave is an object of worship in festivals and is a rock cave on the other side of the Iwato River from nishihongū. You can see the cave from nishihongū after participating in a Shinto ritual for purification.

== Gallery ==
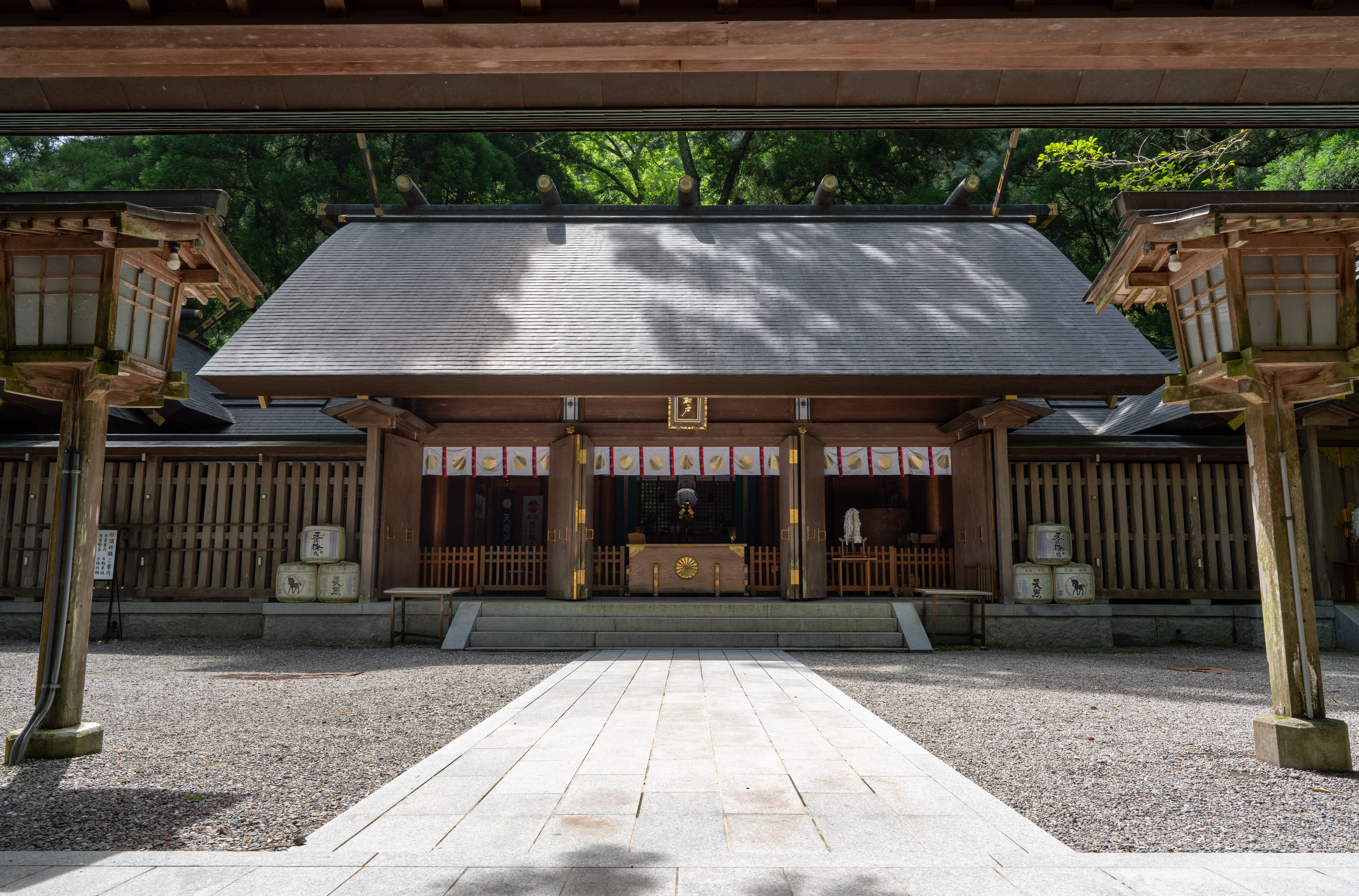
Amanoiwato-jinja nishihongū

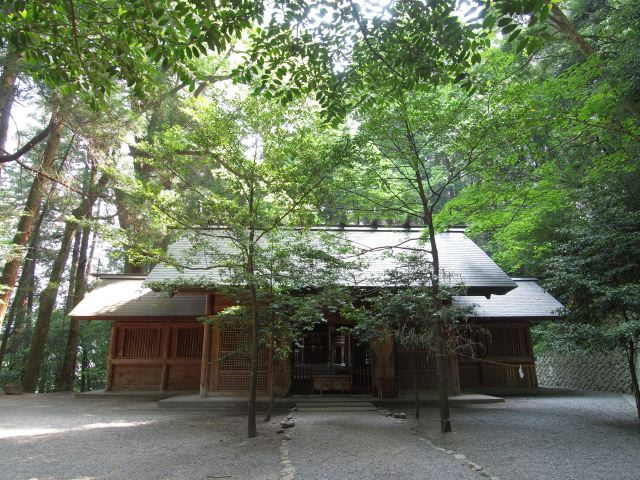
Amanoiwato-jinja higashihongū

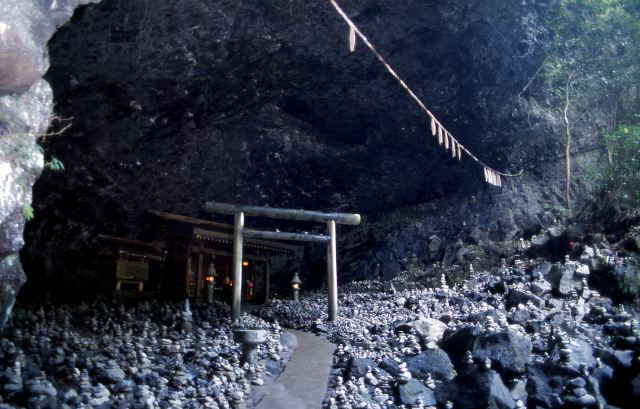
The Takamagahara pantheon is thought to have gathered and discussed how to get Amaterasu out of the Heavenly Rock Cave, Amano-Iwato, at this riverside cave
