= Takachiho Railway =

Japanese railway company

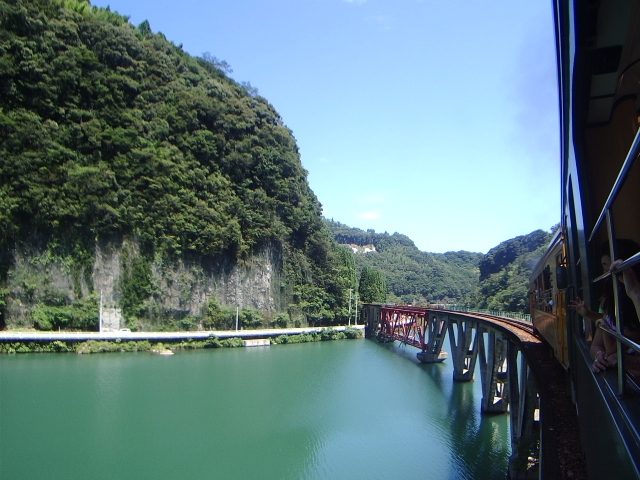
Bridge on Gokase River

Takachiho Railway (高千穂鉄道, Takachiho Tetsudō) was a Japanese railway company. The company, located in Miyazaki Prefecture, suspended operation of their railway after Typhoon Nabi in 2005, and was liquidated in 2009.

== Line ==
The company operated the Takachiho Line connecting Nobeoka Station in Nobeoka, Miyazaki and Takachiho Station in Takachiho, Miyazaki. The government authorization of the railway business was abolished for half of the line in 2007, and for the remaining half in 2008.

- Distance 50.0 km (31 mi)
  - Nobeoka — Makinine 29.1 km (18.1 mi), officially closed on September 6, 2007
  - Makimine — Takachiho 20.9 kilometres (13.0 mi), officially closed on December 28, 2008
- Gauge: 1,067 mm (3 ft 6 in)
- Stations: 19
- Double-track line: None
- Electrification: None
- Signalling: Simplified automatic

== History ==
The Takachiho Line, originally named the Hinokage Line (日ノ影線, Hinokage-sen) of Japanese Government Railways (JGR), opened on February 20, 1935, running between Nobeoka and Hyūga-Okamoto stations. The line was transferred to Japanese National Railways following JGR's dissolution in 1949.

Following extensions, the line reached Takachiho Station on July 22, 1972, and was renamed the Takachiho Line.

Freight service ceased in 1974. In 1982, all service was suspended for four months due to typhoon damage.

When the national railway was privatized in 1987, the line was transferred to JR Kyushu. They withdrew from the operation of the Takachiho Line and transferred it to Takachiho Railway, a new company established by local funds, on April 28, 1989.

On September 6, 2005, flooding triggered by Typhoon Nabi washed away two bridges on the line, halting all operations. By December, it was clear that no government funding for rebuilding was available. Attempts by local communities to rebuild the railway were unsuccessful. A shareholders' resolution made on January 6, 2009 started the company's liquidation procedures which ended in March 2009 with no distribution to shareholders.

A new company, Takachiho Amaterasu Railway, was established in March 2006. It repurposed a section of the line in Takachiho for tourist services. Heritage railway trains currently run from Takachiho Station to the railway bridge (the highest in Japan) just past the former Amanoiwato Station, which was left in tact with the original station building and timetables.

=== Former proposed extension ===
After the line opened in 1972, construction of the 23 km section from Takachiho to the Takamori line continued until 1975, when flooding in the 6500m Takamori tunnel (16 km north of Takachiho) resulted in work being suspended. Construction was formally abandoned in 1980.

== Stations ==
| Station | Japanese | Distance (km) | Opened on | Transfers | Location | | | Coordinates |
|---|---|---|---|---|---|---|---|---|
| Nobeoka | 延岡 | 0.0 | 1922-05-01 | JR Kyushu: Nippo Main Line | Nobeoka | | Miyazaki; Prefecture | 32°35′24″N 131°40′21″E |
| Nishinobeoka | 西延岡 | 4.1 | 1935-02-20 | | Nobeoka | | Miyazaki; Prefecture | 32°35′12″N 131°38′24″E |
| Mukabaki | 行縢 | 6.8 | 1935-02-20 | | Nobeoka | | Miyazaki; Prefecture | 32°34′45″N 131°36′49″E |
| Hosomi | 細見 | 10.4 | 1957-02-01 | | Nobeoka | | Miyazaki; Prefecture | 32°34′00″N 131°34′50″E |
| Hyūga-Okamoto | 日向岡元 | 11.6 | 1935-02-20 | | Nobeoka | | Miyazaki; Prefecture | 32°33′55″N 131°34′08″E |
| Hakiai | 吐合 | 13.3 | 1957-02-01 | | Nobeoka | | Miyazaki; Prefecture | 32°33′56″N 131°33′02″E |
| Soki | 曽木 | 14.6 | 1936-04-12 | | Nobeoka | | Miyazaki; Prefecture | 32°34′23″N 131°32′30″E |
| Kawazuru | 川水流 | 17.1 | 1936-04-12 | | Nobeoka | | Miyazaki; Prefecture | 32°33′38″N 131°31′26″E |
| Kamizaki | 上崎 | 19.9 | 1957-02-01 | | Nobeoka | | Miyazaki; Prefecture | 32°34′36″N 131°30′40″E |
| Hayahito | 早日渡 | 24.9 | 1937-09-03 | | Nobeoka | | Miyazaki; Prefecture | 32°36′18″N 131°29′04″E |
| Kamegasaki | 亀ヶ崎 | 26.4 | 1957-02-01 | | Nobeoka | | Miyazaki; Prefecture | 32°36′02″N 131°28′12″E |
| Makimine | 槇峰 | 29.1 | 1937-09-03 | | Hinokage | Nishiusuki; District | Miyazaki; Prefecture | 32°36′42″N 131°26′50″E |
| Hyūga-Yato | 日向八戸 | 31.5 | 1939-10-11 | | Hinokage | Nishiusuki; District | Miyazaki; Prefecture | 32°37′16″N 131°25′48″E |
| Gomi | 吾味 | 32.9 | 1957-02-01 | | Hinokage | Nishiusuki; District | Miyazaki; Prefecture | 32°37′23″N 131°25′02″E |
| Hinokageonsen | 日之影温泉 | 37.6 | 1939-10-11 | | Hinokage | Nishiusuki; District | Miyazaki; Prefecture | 32°38′56″N 131°23′29″E |
| Kagemachi | 影待 | 40.4 | 1972-07-22 | | Hinokage | Nishiusuki; District | Miyazaki; Prefecture | 32°39′56″N 131°22′23″E |
| Fukasumi | 深角 | 44.0 | 1972-07-22 | | Hinokage | Nishiusuki; District | Miyazaki; Prefecture | 32°40′55″N 131°20′41″E |
| Amanoiwato | 天岩戸 | 47.9 | 1972-07-22 | | Takachiho | Nishiusuki; District | Miyazaki; Prefecture | 32°42′31″N 131°19′40″E |
| Takachiho | 高千穂駅 | 50.0 | 1972-07-22 | | Takachiho | Nishiusuki; District | Miyazaki; Prefecture | 32°42′53″N 131°18′23″E |

== Rolling stock ==
=== Since 2005 ===
- TR100 (101, 102, 203, 104, 105)
- TR200 (201, 202)
- TR400 (401, 402)

Following the closure of the line, two truck-style sightseeing cars, TR401 and TR402, were purchased by JR Kyushu upon an offer from Takachiho Railway. They were refurbished and began use on the new Umisachi Yamasachi limited express train on the Nichinan Line in October 2009.

Among ordinary railcars, TR201 was given to Asa Kaigan Railway without compensation, and went into service in 2009. All other ordinary cars were not used for passenger services. TR104 and TR105 were given to the town of Hinokage and are preserved at Hinokage-Onsen Station, and later became the Hinokage Town Train Inn. TR101 and TR202 were given to the town of Takachiho and are preserved at Takachiho Station. Others were scrapped.

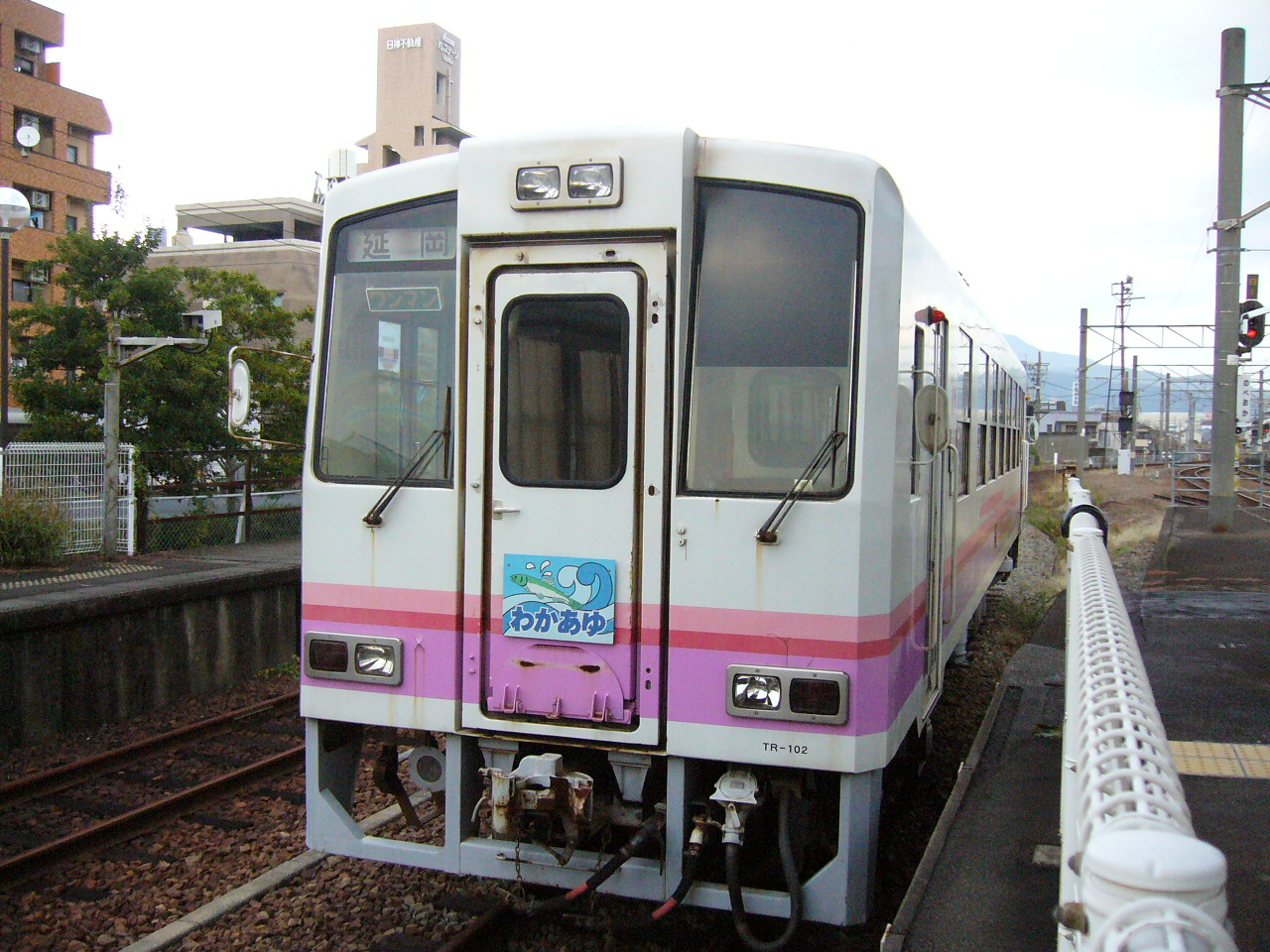
TR100 for local trains run by Takachiho Amaterasu Railway

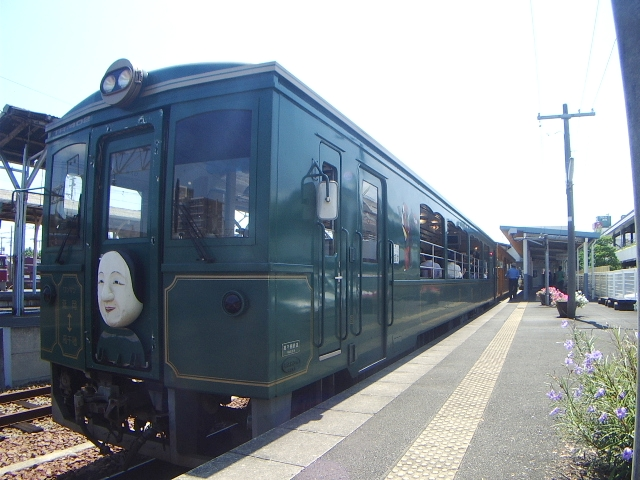
Amanouzume-gō used for Torokko-Kagura-gō

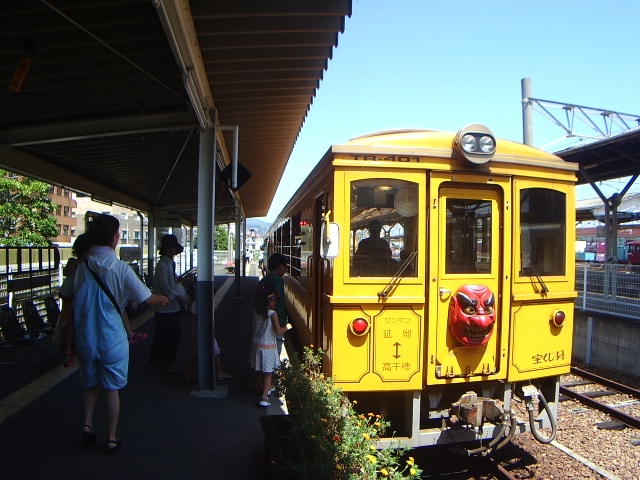
Tajikarao-gō used for Torokko-Kagura-gō

=== Before 2005 ===
- TR300

== Current operations ==
Takachiho Amaterasu Railway (高千穂あまてらす鉄道, Takachiho Amaterasu Tetsudō) operates the line between Takachiho and the rail bridge just past Amanoiwato as a heritage railway.
