= Ame-no-Uzume =

Shinto goddess of dawn, mirth and revelry

- Goddess of the Dawn, meditation, and the arts
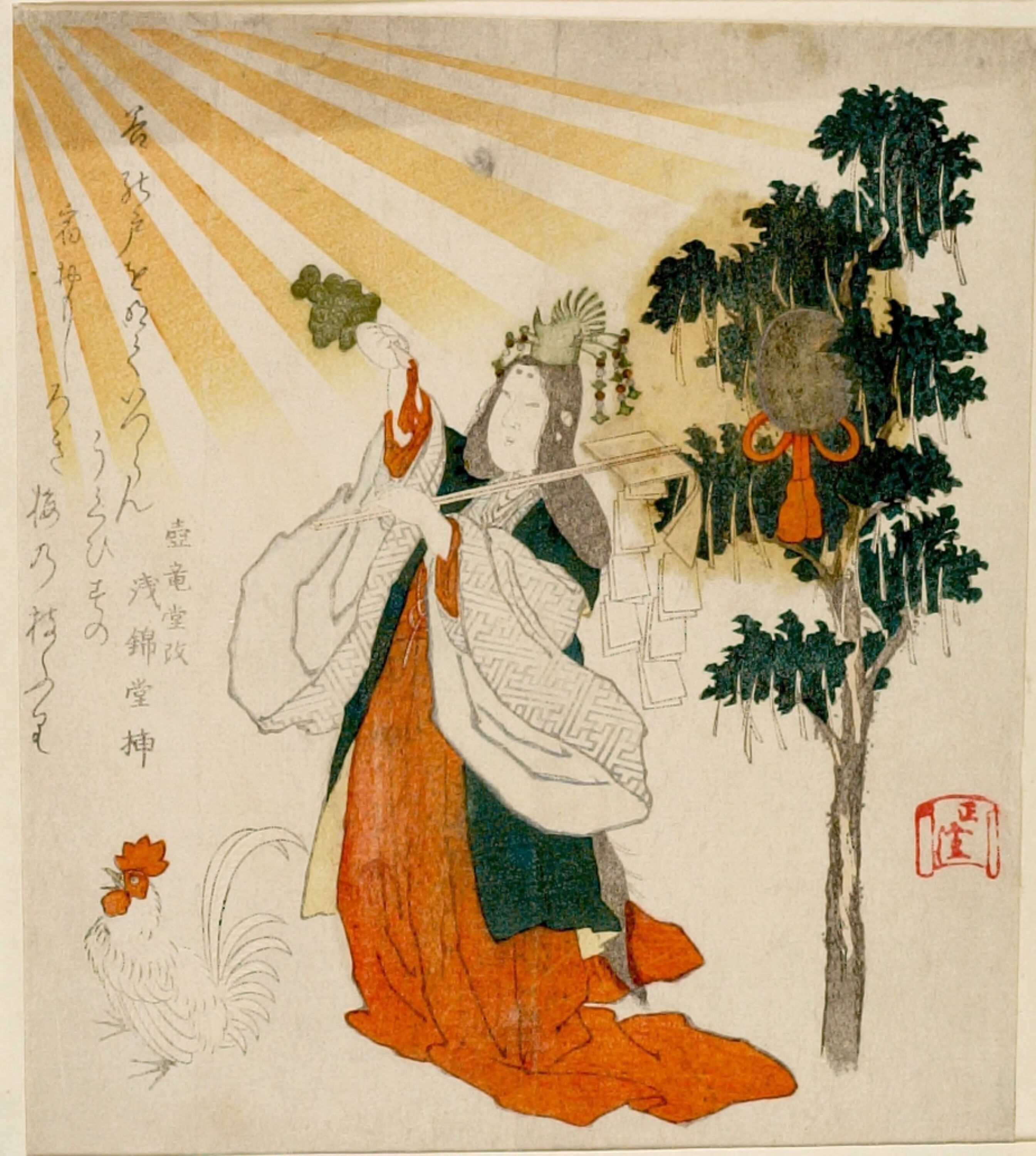
- Ame-no-Uzume depicted in a 19th century print
- Consort: Sarutahiko Ōkami

Equivalents
- Greek: Eos
- Hindu: Ushas
- Roman: Aurora
- Nuristani: Disani

Ame-no-Uzume-no-Mikoto (Japanese: 天宇受売命, 天鈿女命) (Note: -no-Mikoto is a common honorific appended to the names of Japanese gods; it may be understood as similar to the English honorific 'the Great'.) is the goddess of humor, dancing happiness, joy, dawn, mirth, meditation, revelry and the arts in the Shinto religion of Japan, and the wife of fellow-god Sarutahiko Ōkami. She famously helped draw out the missing sun deity, Amaterasu Omikami, when she had hidden herself in a cave. Her name can also be pronounced as Ama-no-Uzume-no-Mikoto. She is also known as Ōmiyanome-no-Ōkami, an inari kami possibly due to her relationship with her husband. She is known as The Great Persuader, and The Heavenly Alarming Female. She is depicted in kyōgen farce as Okame, a woman who revels in her sensuality.

== Mythology ==
=== Amaterasu and the cave ===
Amaterasu's brother, the storm god Susano'o, had vandalized her rice fields, threw a flayed horse at her loom, and brutally killed one of her maidens due to a quarrel between them. In turn, Amaterasu became furious with him and retreated into the Heavenly Rock Cave, Amano-Iwato. The world, without the illumination of the sun, became dark and the gods could not lure Amaterasu out of her hiding place.

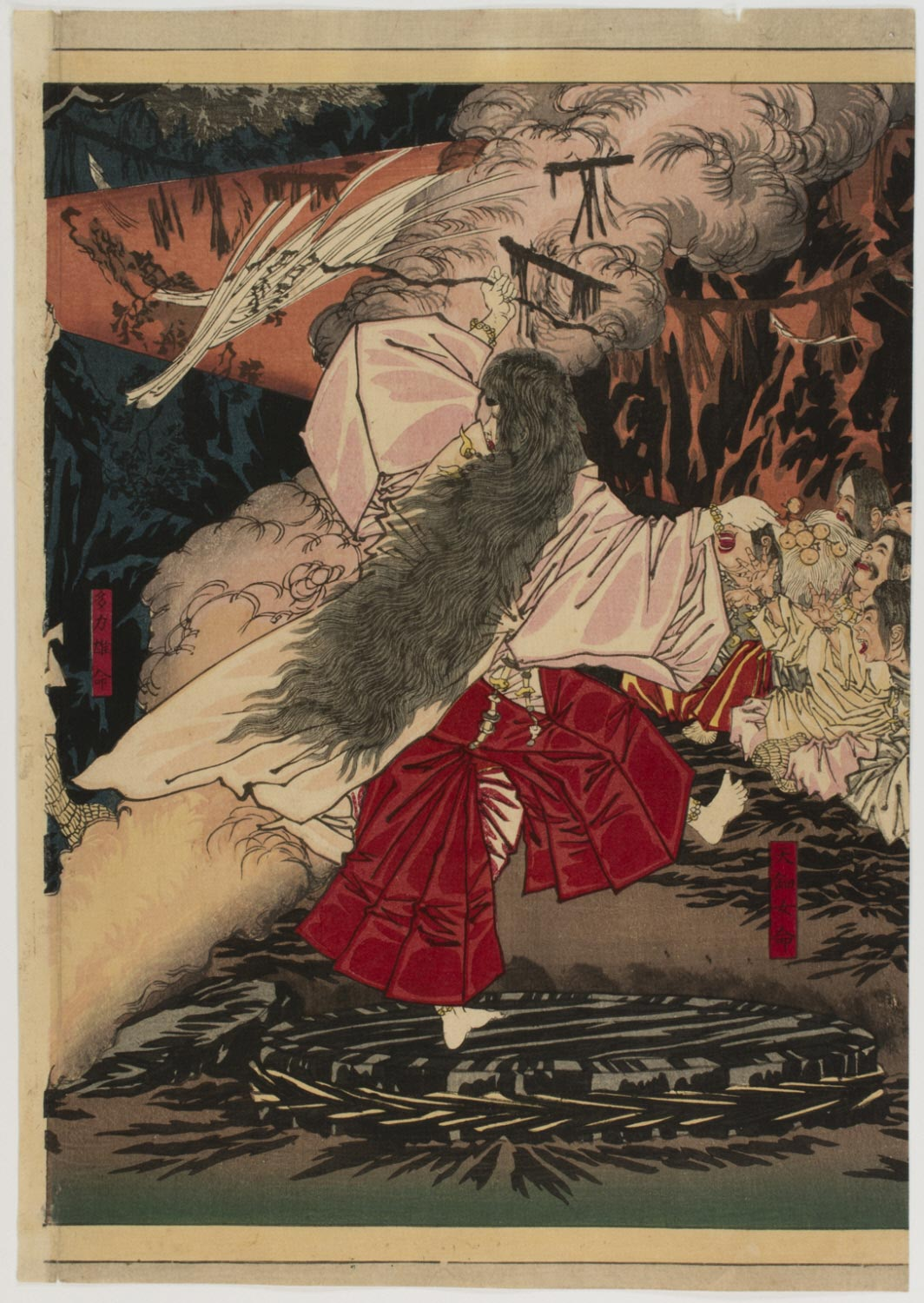
Uzume dancing to lure out Amaterasu.

The clever Uzume overturned a tub near the cave entrance and began to dance on it, tearing off her clothing in front of the other deities. They considered this so comical that they laughed heartily at the sight. This dance is said to have founded the Japanese ritual dance, Kagura. This is supported by other traditions claiming that the first kagura was danced by a shamaness who was a kami, Ame-no-Uzume, through luring (invoking the presence of) Amaterasu, thereby reenacting the intentions of the kagura as an act of communication to other deities. Moreover, in addition to inspiring the origins of the kagura, the myth of Ame-no-Uzume has also influenced the sources of three Shamanic elements later being incorporated into Shinto ritual and the kagura, being the Omoto Kagura, Hana Matsuri, and the Hayachine Kagura in presenting shamanic choreography as ritual communication, what the myth is most known for contributing.

Uzume had hung a bronze mirror and a beautiful jewel of polished jade. Amaterasu heard them, and peered out to see what the commotion was about. When she opened the cave, she saw the jewel and her glorious reflection in a mirror which Uzume had placed on a tree, and slowly came out from her clever hiding spot.

At that moment, the god Ame-no-Tajikarawo-no-mikoto dashed forth and closed the cave behind her, refusing to budge so that she could no longer retreat. Another god tied a magic shimenawa (compare the Nuristani myth of a chaff attaching itself to the thread around a house near heaven) across the entrance. The deities Ame-no-Koyane-no-mikoto and Ame-no-Futodama-no-mikoto then asked Amaterasu to rejoin the divine. She agreed, and light was restored to the earth.

=== Uzume and Sarutahiko ===
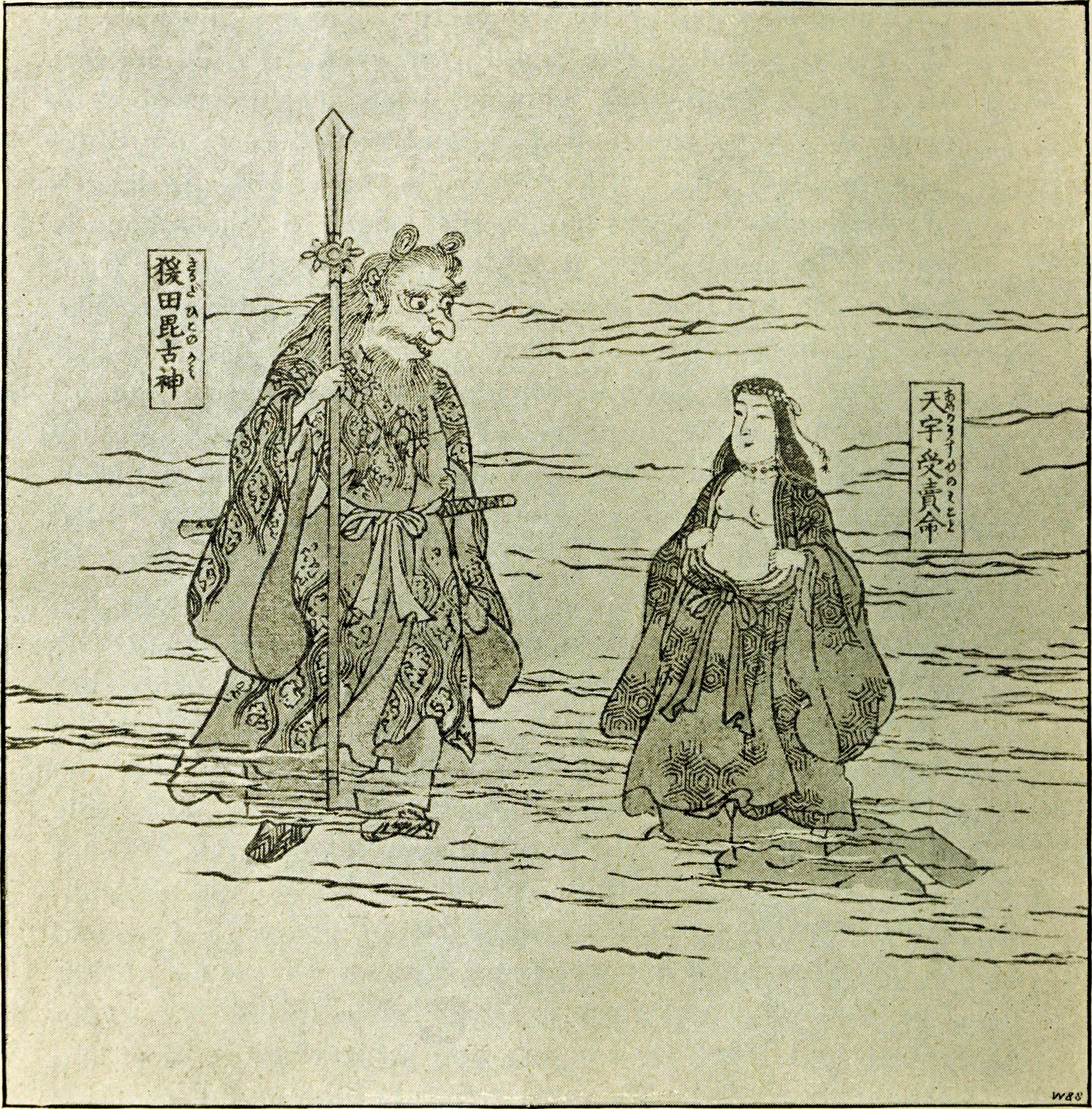

Amaterasu orders Uzume to accompany her grandson Ninigi on his journey to earth. They head to Ame-no-ukihashi ("floating bridge of heaven") so they could head to earth but they are blocked by Sarutahiko. According to a variant account in the Nihon Shoki, the other heavenly deities were reluctant to confront Sarutahiko, afraid of his fearsome appearance: his nose measured seven hand-spans in length, he stood over seven feet tall, and his eyes shone red like mirrors. Only Uzume dared approach him, mocking him with laughter as she exposed herself before him. Uzume comes and persuades Sarutahiko to let Ninigi pass, in other versions of the story Uzume flirts with Sarutahiko. During this journey, she cut the mouth of the sea cucumber with her dagger, causing it to fall permanently silent.

Later, Uzume and Sarutahiko fall in love and got married. Together, they found the Sarume clan. After escorting Ninigi safely to earth, Uzume accompanied Sarutahiko back to his native land of Ise, where he took up fishing at Azaka; one day his hand became caught in a clam shell and he drowned. The Kojiki records that his spirit received three different names corresponding to each stage of his drowning: Sokodokumitama as he sank to the bottom, Tsubutatsumitama as bubbles rose to the surface, and Awasakumitama when the bubbles burst. In recognition of her service, Uzume was given a new name derived from Sarutahiko's own, becoming Sarume-no-Kimi, head of the Sarume clan.

== Worship ==
Tablet at the Ama-no-Uzume shrine in Takachiho

Ame-no-Uzume-no-Mikoto is still worshipped today as a Shinto kami. There are many shrines dedicated to the goddess including Chiyo shrine, Tsubaki America Shrine and Tsubaki Grand Shrine. In some, she is worshipped as a patroness of dancers and performers. Furthermore, there are connections between the myths of Ame-no-Uzume-no-Mikoto alongside the eighth-century mythic texts that describe the similar yet unique mythology between 21st-century Japan and modern myth scholarship; being that there are debates both in the Japanese and English languages in terms of rendering the names of specific places, objects and characters in the Kiki to modern script. Moreover, the debate comes down to some characters in the Kiki having their Chinese characters within their name being consistent in translation while others are not, an example being with Ame-no-Uzume in different texts using different orthographies. As such, it is theorized that this decision is significant to the names in referring to the character phonetically as an identity that is of multiple sources, with scholars writing Ame-no-Uzume's name in katakana heavily implying that the ideal form of the figure is within an abstract dimension rather than limited to a single textual appearance, asserting her outside of specific historically grounded texts.

Along with her husband, she is addressed during the November festival of Tori-no-ichi in which masks or pictures of the pair are sold.

The founder of the Japanese new religion Shintō Tenkōkyo, named Tomokiyo Yoshisane (友清歓真), received a divine revelation to practice the ritual of mikiyome tamashizume (浄身鎮魂法) (lit. 'body purification and soul strengthening') from Ame-no-Uzume during a kishin session on October 28, 1920.

== Similarities to Vedic religion ==
According to Michael Witzel, Uzume is most closely related to the Vedic goddess Ushas (uṣás), a descendant of the Proto-Indo-European goddess Hausos (*h₂éwsōs), and the Nuristani goddess Disani. Both goddesses share many similarities such as the cave (Vala/Iwato) and the exposure of breasts as a sign of friendship. Witzel proposed that the Japanese, Vedic, and Nuristani religions are much more closely related compared to other mythologies under what he calls Laurasian mythology, and that the three myths, may go back to the Indo-Iranian period, around 2000 BCE. This would make Uzume analogous to the Greek goddess Eos and the Roman goddess Aurora.

== See also ==
- Baubo
