= Ratri =

Hindu/Vedic goddess of night

- Personification of the night
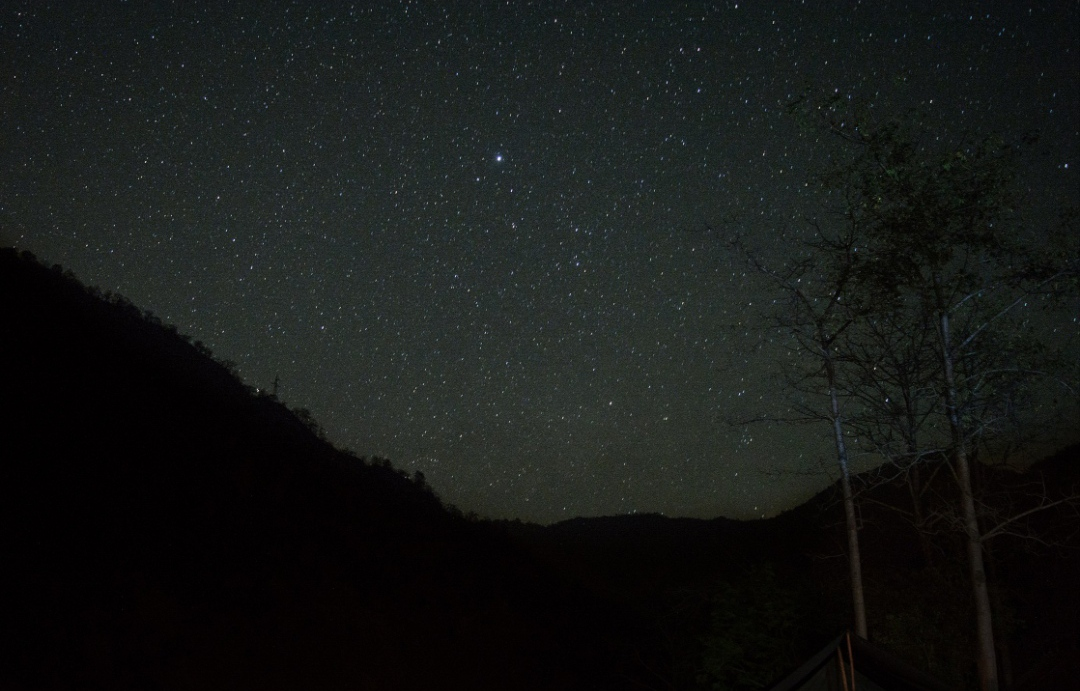
- Ratri is the Vedic personification of the night. Above: Night sky at Rishikesh, Uttarakhand, India
- Affiliation: Devi
- Texts: Vedas

Genealogy
- Parents: Dyaus (father); Prithvi (mother)
- Siblings: Ushas (sister); Indra (brother)

Equivalents
- Greek: Nyx
- Norse: Nótt

Ratri (Sanskrit: रात्रि, romanized: Rātrī, lit. 'Night'; also referred to as Nakt), is a Vedic goddess in Hinduism. She is the personification of the night. The majority of references to Ratri are found in Rigveda and she is described as the sister of Ushas, the personification of dawn. Together with Ushas, she is referred to as a powerful mother and strengthener of vital power. She represents cyclic rhythmic patterns of the cosmos. Her physical appearance isn't explicitly mentioned, but she is described as a beautiful maiden.

One hymn in the Rigveda and five hymns in the Atharvaveda are dedicated to her. In later Tantric texts she occupies an important position. She is associated with Ushas, Indra, Rta, Satya in Rigveda, whereas in Atharvaveda she is associated with Surya. The Brahmanas and the Sutra literature often mention Ratri.

== See also ==
- Dewi Ratih
- Ushas
- Aditi
