= Ame-no-Tajikarao =

God in Japanese mythology

Ame no Tajikarao
- God of Physical Power, Strength and Sports
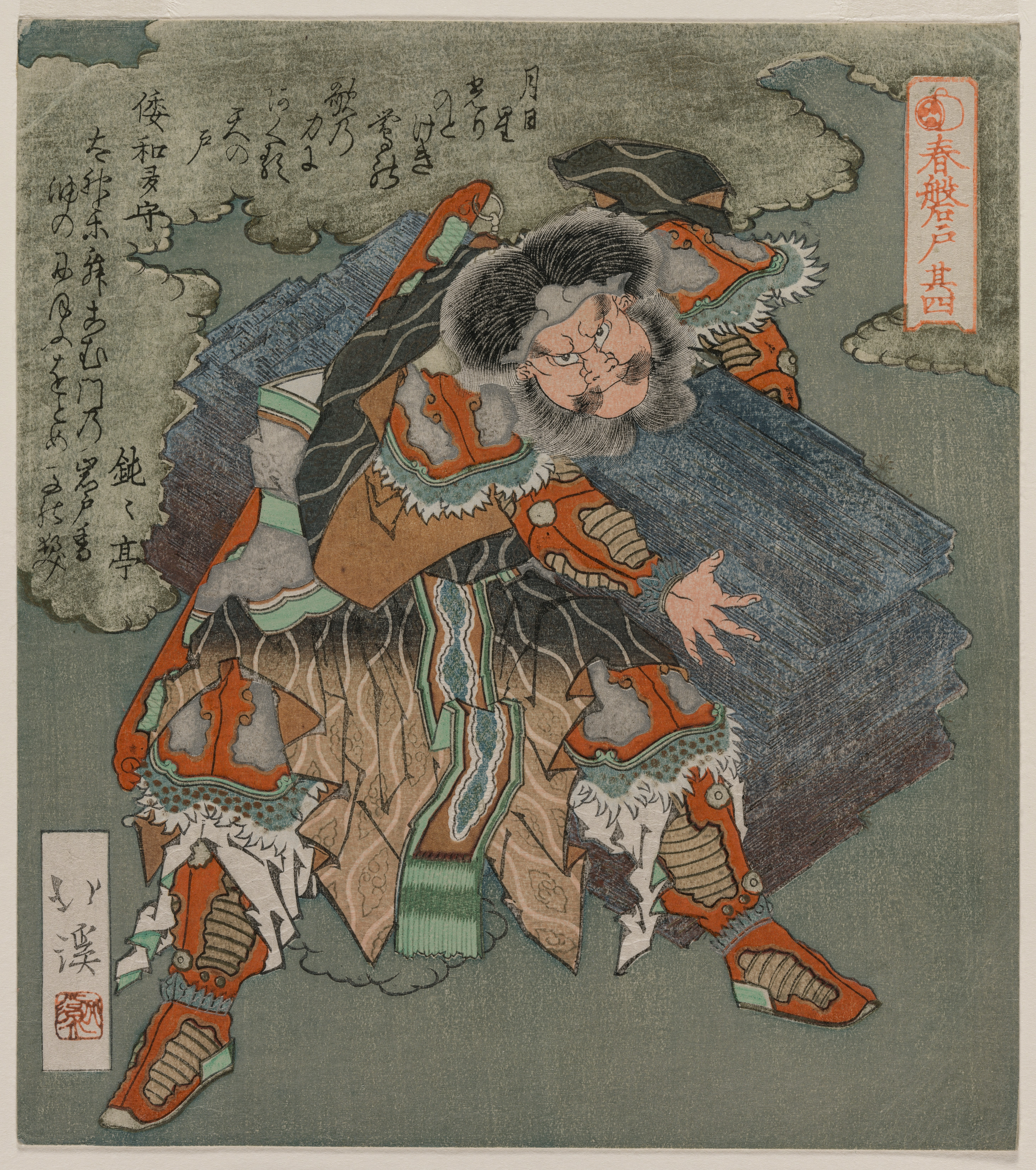
- Tajikarao lifting the cave-door, by Hokkei, 1825

Genealogy
- Parents: Omoikane (father)
- Siblings: Ame no Uwaharu; Ame no Shitaharu
- Children: Ame no Hiwashi

Equivalents
- Greek: Heracles

Ame no Tajikarao (アメノタヂカラオ) is a Japanese deity (kami) of physical strength who appears in Japanese mythology. Ame no Tajikarao is written as 天手力男神 in Kojiki, and 天手力雄神 in Nihon Shoki. Tajikarao's name means "Heavenly Hand-Strength-Male Deity".

Another name is Oosugutama-no-mikoto or Takuzutama-no-mikoto (多久豆魂命), as Ama-no-Iwatowake-no-kami (天石門別神) other names is Ookuzutama-no-mikoto (大国栖玉命) and Tachikarao-mikoto (大刀辛雄命).

== Mythological description ==
During the incident of Ame no Iwato , Ame no Tajikarao waited at the cave's door to pull out (in the Nihon Shoki and the Kogo Shūi, 'to pull open') Amaterasu from the cave, and thus return light to the world.

During the Tenson Kōrin, Amaterasu had Omoikane, Tajikarao, and Ame no Iwatowake accompany the Imperial Regalia of Japan when it went to the Ise province to be enshrined at Ise Grand Shrine.

According to the genealogy of the Inbe clan cited in the Yamato Shiryō, Ame no Tajikarao was the son of Omoikane as well as a distant ancestor of the Achi clan.

According to the genealogy of the Mochizuki clan, he was also the grandson of the primordial goddess Kamimusubi and the ancestor of a clan of the ancient kingdom of Ki no Kuni Miyatsuko.

He is the father of Ame no Hiwashi who was an ancestor of the Inbe clan of Awa Province.

At the Togakushi Shrine, there is a legend that says that the cave-door of Ame no Iwato that Ame no Tajikarao threw away actually fell to Earth and became Mount Togakushi.

== Explanation ==
The name Ame no Tajikarao carries the connotation of a male god with extreme and surmounting physical brute strength. The Japanese company, Tachikara, which specializes in sports equipment, is named after the god, because he is "known historically as the 'god of power' in Japanese folklore."

== Shrines ==
Ame no Tajikaro is believed to be a god of sports and physical power, and is enshrined at shrines associated:

- Aiki Shrine (合気神社) - Iwama, Ibaraki
- Ama-no-iwatowake Yasukutama-nushi-amatsukami Shrine (天石門別安國玉主天神社) - Takaoka District, Kōchi Prefecture
- Ame-no-ta-nagao Shrine (天手長男神社) - Iki, Nagasaki Prefecture
- Haseyamaguchisuwa Shrine (長谷山口坐神社) - Sakurai (city), Nara Prefecture
- Iwatowake Shrine (伊波止和気神社) - Ishikawa District, Fukushima Prefecture
- Ise Grand Shrine (伊勢神宮) - Ise, Mie Prefecture
- Ōmatsuri-ame-no-iwatohiko Shrine (大祭天石門彦神社) - Hamada (city), Shimane Prefecture
- Oyama Shrine (雄山神社) - Nakaniikawa District, Toyama Prefecture
- Sana Shrine (佐那神社) - Taki District, Mie Prefecture
- Shirai Shrine (白井神社) - Amagasaki, Hyōgo Prefecture
- Takuzudama Shrine (多久頭魂神社) - Tsushima (city), Nagasaki Prefecture
- Tejikarao Shrine (手力雄神社) - Gifu (city), Gifu Prefecture
- Tejikarao Shrine (手力雄神社) - Kakamigahara, Gifu Prefecture
- Toake Shrine (戸明神社) - Kitakyushu (city), Fukuoka Prefecture
- Togakushi Shrine (戸隠神社) - Nagano city, Nagano Prefecture
