= Amano-Iwato =

Cave in Japanese mythology

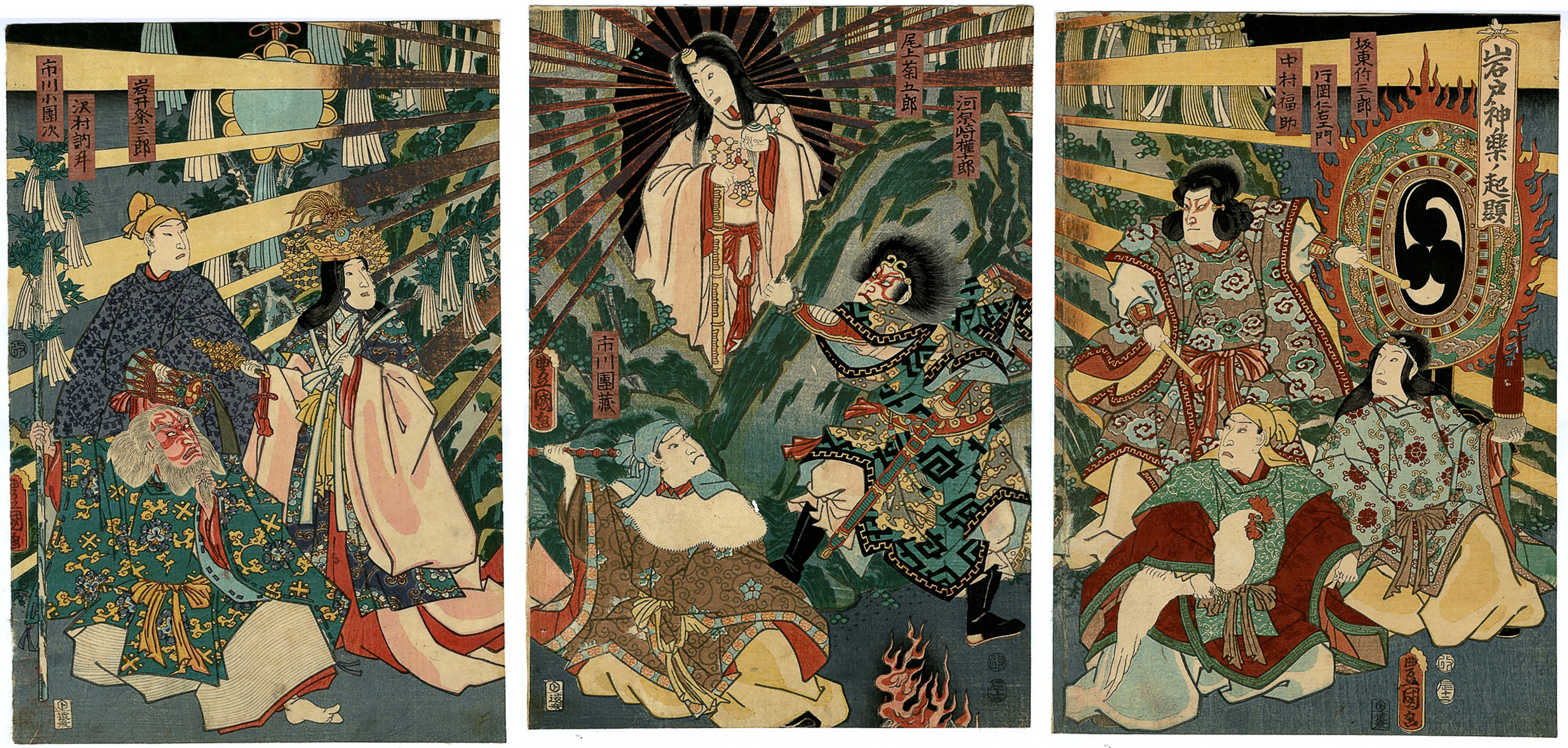
Amaterasu emerges from the Heavenly Rock Cave, bringing sunlight back to the world (Triptych by Kunisada)

Ama-no-Iwato (天の岩戸; literally "heaven's rock cave") is a cave in Japanese mythology. According to the Kojiki (Records of Ancient Matters) and the Nihon Shoki, the bad behavior of Susano'o, the Japanese god of storms, drove his sister Amaterasu into the Ama-no-Iwato cave. The land was thus deprived of light.

In order to get Amaterasu out of the cave, all the other eight million gods threw a party outside with wisdom of Omoikane. The goddess Ame-no-Uzume-no-Mikoto performed a lewd dance, eliciting laughter. Amaterasu grew curious about the source of amusement and peeked out of the cave entrance. She became fascinated by her own reflection in the mirror Yata no Kagami which the other gods had crafted and hung before the cave for that purpose, and stood transfixed. Ame-no-Tajikarao then forced the cave open and the world was bathed in light once again. As Amaterasu stepped out of the cave, a holy seal was applied to it so that she could never go back into hiding.

== Higashihongu ==
The main shrine called Higashihongu (east hall) and a hall of worship called Nishihongu (west hall) face each other across the Iwato River gorge. The Ama-no-Iwato cave is an object of worship in festivals and is a rock cave on the other side of the Iwato River from Nishihongu. You can see the cave from Nishihongu after participating in a Shinto ritual for purification.

The grounds contain many plants and old trees. There are also rare ancient ginkgo and Magnolia compressa trees, which have been considered sacred in Japan since ancient times.

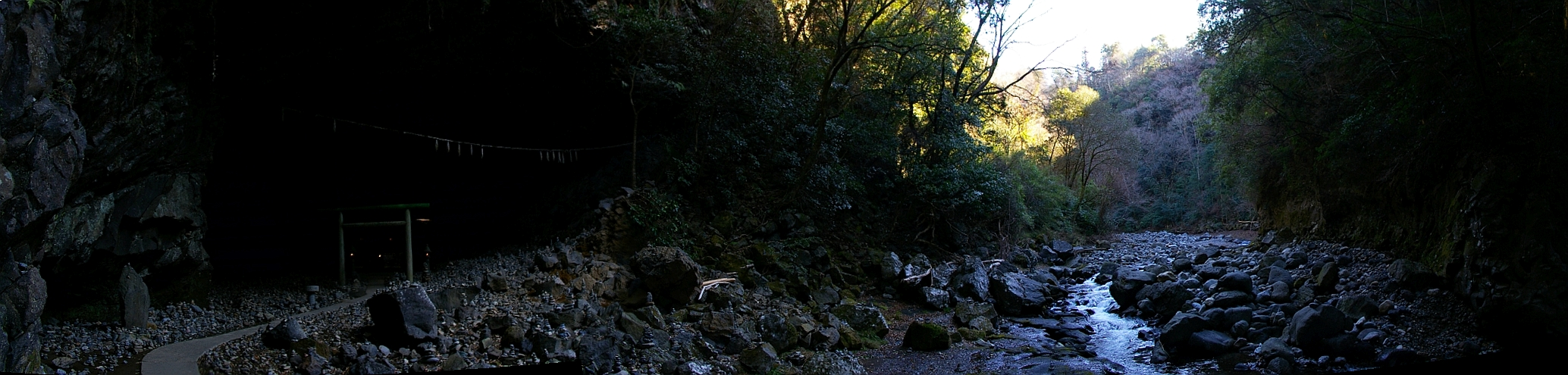
The Takamagahara pantheon is thought to have gathered and discussed how to get Amaterasu out of the cave at this riverside, 天安河原 (Ama no Yasugawara), at Amanoiwato-jinja in Takachiho, Miyazaki Prefecture.

== See also ==
- Harae
- Vala (Vedic)
