= Awa Province =

Awa Province may refer to:

- Awa Province (Chiba) (安房国) in modern-day Chiba Prefecture
- Awa Province (Tokushima) (阿波国) in modern-day Tokushima Prefecture
