= Vala (Vedic) =

Mythological demon from the Vedas

Vala (valá-), meaning "enclosure" in Vedic Sanskrit, is a demon mentioned in the Vedas, including the Rigveda and the Atharvaveda. Vala is attributed to be the son of Tvashtr and therefore the brother of Vrtra.

Historically, it has the same origin as the Vrtra story, being derived from the same root, and from the same root also as Varuna, *val-/var- (PIE *wel-) "to cover, to enclose" (perhaps cognate to veil).

Parallel to Vrtra "the blocker", a stone serpent slain by Indra to liberate the rivers, Vala is a stone cave, split by Indra (intoxicated and strengthened by Soma, identified with Brhaspati in 4.50 and 10.68 or Trita in 1.52, aided by the Angirasas in 2.11), to liberate the cows and Ushas, hidden there by the Panis.

Already in 2.24, the story is given a mystical interpretation, with warlike Indra replaced by Brahmanaspati, the lord of prayer, who split Vala with prayer (brahman) rather than with the thunderbolt.

Vala is mentioned 23 times in the Rigveda, Vala appears in hymns RV 1.11, 52, 62, RV 2.11, 12, 14, 15, 24, RV 3.30, 34, RV 4, 50, RV 6.18, 39, RV 8.14, 24, RV 10.67, 68, 138.

Central verses of the story (trans. Griffith):

2.12.3 Who slew the Dragon, freed the Seven Rivers, and drove the kine forth from the cave of Vala,
Begat the fire between two stones, the spoiler in warriors' battle, He, O men, is Indra.

2.15.8 Praised by the Angirases he slaughtered Vala, and burst apart the bulwarks of the mountain.
He tore away their deftly-built defences. These things did Indra in the Soma's rapture.

8.14.7 In Soma's ecstasy Indra spread the firmament and realms of light, when he cleft Vala limb from limb. (compare to this description the Purusha sukta)

10.68.6 Brhaspati, when he with fiery lightnings cleft through the weapon of reviling Vala,
Consumed him as tongues eat what teeth have compassed: he threw the prisons of the red cows open.

1.11.5 Lord of the thunder, thou didst burst the cave of Vala rich in cows.
The Gods came pressing to thy side, and free from terror aided thee,

1.62.4 Mid shout, loud shout, and roar, with the Navagvas, seven singers, hast thou, heavenly, rent the mountain;
Thou hast, with speeders, with Dasagvas, Indra, Shakra, with thunder rent obstructive Vala.

== See also ==
- Veles (god)
- Amano-Iwato
