= Ushas =

Goddess of dawn in Hinduism and Vedism

- Personification of the Dawn
- Devanagari: उषस्
- Affiliation: Devi
- Texts: Vedas

Genealogy
- Parents: Dyaus (father); Prithvi (mother)
- Siblings: Ratri (sister), and Indra (brother),
- Consort: Surya

Equivalents
- Greek: Eos
- Indo-European: H₂éwsōs
- Norse: Eostre
- Roman: Aurora
- Slavic: Zorya
- Japanese: Ame-no-Uzume
- Nuristani: Disani

Ushas (Vedic Sanskrit: उषस्, IAST: Uṣás, nominative singular उषास्) is a Vedic goddess of dawn in Hinduism. She repeatedly appears in the Rigvedic hymns, states David Kinsley, where she is "consistently identified with dawn, revealing herself with the daily coming of light to the world, driving away oppressive darkness, chasing away evil demons, rousing all life, setting all things in motion, sending everyone off to do their duties". She is the life of all living creatures, the impeller of action and breath, the foe of chaos and confusion, the auspicious arouser of cosmic and moral order called the Ṛta in Sanskrit.

Ushas is the most exalted goddess in the Rig Veda, but not as important or central as the three male Vedic deities Agni, Soma, and Indra. She is on par with other major male Vedic deities. She is portrayed as a beautifully adorned young woman riding in a golden chariot or a hundred chariots, drawn by golden red horses or cows, on her path across the sky, making way for the Vedic sun god Surya, who is referred either as her husband or her son. Some analysts describe several of the hymns dedicated to her in the Vedas as the most beautiful. Her sister is "Nisha" or Ratri, the deity of night.

== Etymology ==
Vedic uṣás is derived from the word uṣá which means "dawn". This word comes from Proto-Indo-Iranian *Hušā́s (ušā in Avestan), which in turn is from Proto-Indo-European *h₂éwsōs ("dawn"), and is related to ēṓs in Greek and aušrà in Lithuanian. It is also the basis for the word "east" in Indo-European traditions, state Mallory and Adams.

Uṣás is an s-stem, i.e. the genitive case is uṣásas, whereby it connotes "dawn goddess" in Indo-European languages. Ushas is related to the Proto-Indo-European goddess *h₂ausos-. Her cognates in other Indo-European pantheons include the Greek goddess Eos, the Roman goddess Aurora, the Lithuanian goddess Aušrinė, and the English goddess Ēostre (OE: ēastre), whose name is probably the root of the modern English word "Easter."

== Description ==
Ushas is the prominent goddess of dawn in the Vedas. She is depicted as the one who imbues all beings with life, as the "life of all life" and "breath of all breaths", according to Jones and Ryan. She is revered as the deity who revivifies earth each day, drives away the chaos and the darkness, sets all things in motion, sends all living beings to do their duties in the Vedas.

Ushas is the most important goddess in the Vedic literature, but she is not as important as the three central male deities named Agni, Soma, and Indra. She is mentioned in far fewer hymns than these three, but at least as much as all other male and female deities in the Vedas.

=== Rigveda ===
Ushas is mentioned in numerous hymns of the Rigveda. Forty of its hymns are dedicated to her, while her name appears in other additional hymns. She is thanked for and petitioned for driving away darkness in hymns 7.78, 6.64 and 10.172; bringer of light urged by Surya in hymn 3.61, and the chaser of evil demons in hymn 8.47. The Rigvedic hymn 1.48 describes her as drawn in a hundred chariots, revealed by the daily arrival of light, one who sets all motion to life and all life to motion, rousing people off to their duties. She is revered for giving strength in hymn 1.44, to Ṛta in hymn 3.61 and 7.75, and participating in daily restoration of order and fighting chaotic forces that threaten the world in hymn 1.113.

Ushas is described in Vedic texts as riding in a shining chariot drawn by golden-red horses or cows, a beautiful maiden bedecked with jewels, smiling and irresistibly attractive, who brings cheer to all those who gaze upon her. She dispels darkness, reveals treasures and truths that have been hidden, illuminates the world as it is. Hymn 6.64 associates her with wealth and light, while hymn 1.92 calls her the "mother of cows" and one, who like a cow, gives to the benefit of all people. Hymn 1.113 calls her "mother of the gods", while hymn 7.81 describes her as the mother of all living beings who petition her. She is the goddess of the hearth, states hymn 6.64. She symbolizes reality, is a marker of time and a reminder to all that "life is limited on earth". She sees everything as it is, and she is the eye of the gods, according to hymns 7.75–77.

She is variously mentioned as the sister of Ratri (night, also referred to as Nacta), Aditya and one who goes about her ways closely with deities Savitri and Surya. She is also associated with Varuna (sky, water) and Agni (fire).

Many hymns dedicated to Ushas in the Rig Veda, including RV 5.80 (see below), follow the metric structure of the Trishtubh. A large-scale computational study published by Dan C. Baciu in 2025 reveals that this meter that uses the same rhythmic cadence as the Sapphic stanza in ancient Greece and the Hymn to Nikala in Ugarit in 1400 BCE. The meter used for describing Ushas thus carries a similarly broad level of cross-cultural connections as the mythology itself.

In RV 5.80.1-2, Ushas is invoked as follows:

Vedic:

5.80.1a dyutádyāmānam br̥hatī^{́}m r̥téna

5.80.1b r̥tā^{́}varīm aruṇápsuṃ vibhātī^{́}m

5.80.1c devī^{́}m uṣásaṃ súvar āváhantīm

5.80.1d práti víprāso matíbhir jarante

English adaptation by Elea Zoé, preserving the metric structure:

5.80.1a Radiating warmth by her very nature,

5.80.1b Truthful in her ways, and yet coyly blushing,

5.80.1c Ushas, richly crowned by her golden sun rays

5.80.1d Will soon rise and meet with a festive welcome.

In RV 6.64.1-2 (trans. Jamison), Ushas is invoked as follows:

Vedic:

1. úd u śriyá uṣáso rócamānā ásthur apā́ṃ nórmáyo rúśantaḥ
kr̥ṇóti víśvā supáthā sugā́ny ábhūd u vásvī dákṣiṇā maghónī
2. bhadrā́ dadr̥kṣa urviyā́ ví bhāsy út te śocír bhānávo dyā́m apaptan
āvír vákṣaḥ kr̥ṇuṣe śumbʰámānóṣo devi rócamānā máhobhiḥ

English translation:

1. The shining Dawns have arisen for splendor, glistening like the waves of the waters.
She makes all pathways, all passages easy to travel. She has appeared— the good priestly gift, the bounteous one.
2. Auspicious, you have become visible; you radiate widely. Your flare, your radiant beams have flown up to heaven.
You reveal your breast as you go in beauty, goddess Dawn, shining with all your might.

In the "family books" of the Rig Veda (e.g. RV 6.64.5), Ushas is the divine daughter—a divó duhitâ —of Dyaus Pita ("Sky Father").

5. Convey (it)—you who as the unsurpassable one with your oxen convey the boon at your pleasure, Dawn,
you who are a goddess, o Daughter of Heaven. Become worthy to be seen with your munificence at the early invocation!

== Contemporary reverence ==
The revered Gayatri mantra, states George Williams, remains a daily reminder of Ushas in contemporary Hinduism.

According to Sri Aurobindo, Ushas is "the medium of the awakening, the activity and the growth of the other gods; she is the first condition of the Vedic realisation. By her increasing illumination the whole nature of man is clarified; through her [mankind] arrives at the Truth, through her he enjoys [Truth's] beatitude."

Ushas is regionally worshipped during the festival of Chhath Puja, in Bihar and Uttar Pradesh (India), and in Nepal.

== See also ==
- Aušra, Lithuanian goddess of dawn
- Chhaya
- Ēostre
- Ratri
- Surya
- Marici (Buddhism)
- Saranyu
- Shani
- Disani
- Ame-no-Uzume
