= Dhisana =

Dhisana (Sanskrit *Dhīṣaṇā) is one of the Hindu goddess of prosperity in Hinduism. She appears sometimes in the hymns in most of the mandala in Rig Veda one of the vedas. She had also been mentioned as the goddess of fire, sun, moon & stars.

As per the other Hindu texts dhisana name also referred to various other things such as soma vessel, knowledge, intelligence, speech. In the rig veda it is referred as the goddess of abundance and the guardian of the sacred fire.

Few of the Indologists had also noted dhisana in their study & discussions, two of them were German named Alfred Hillebrandt and Richard Pischel.

One another noted Dhisana as the two worlds, heaven and earth. While A. Hillebrandt has noted dhisana mainly as earth and their closely associated group of three named as earth, atmosphere and heaven. A few other Hindu texts noted dhisana as dual planks over which the activity of soma took place.

R. Pischel has noted Dhisana a goddess of wealth similar to Aditi and the earth. The goddess had been mentioned in the following below mandala and hymns in the rig veda.

Dhisana Mention in Rigveda
Mandala, Hymn Index	Hymn Text
rvs.1.22 rvs.3.49 rvs.4.34 rvs.5.41 rvs.7.90 rvs.10.35	Varutri, Dhisana, for aid. Illumining the nights, the Suns' creator, like Dhisana he deals forth strength and riches. Because this day hath Dhisana the Goddess set drink for you: the gladdening draughts have reached Rich Dhisana accords through our obeisance - and Trees and Plants, for the swift gain of riches. 3 The God whom both these worlds brought forth for riches, whom heavenly Dhisana for our wealth I cry to Dhisana, Mother of opulence. We pray to kindled Agni for felicity.

Dhisana in Rigveda Hymns with Translation
Hymns in Sanskrit	Transliteration	English Translation										
आ गना अग्न इहावसे होत्रां यविष्ठ भारतीम | वरूत्रीं धिषणां वह	धर्ता दिवो रजसस पर्ष्ट ऊर्ध्वो रथो न वायुर्वसुभिर्नियुत्वान | कषपां वस्ता जनिता सूर्यस्य विभक्ता भागं धिषणेव वाजम	रभुर विभ्वा वाज इन्द्रो नो अछेमं यज्ञं रत्नधेयोप यात | इदा हि वो धिषणा देव्य अह्नाम अधात पीतिं सम मदा अग्मता वः	अभि वो अर्चे पोष्यावतो नॄन वास्तोष पतिं तवष्टारं रराणः | धन्या सजोषा धिषणा नमोभिर वनस्पतींर ओषधी राय एषे	राये नु यं जज्ञतू रोदसीमे राये देवी धिषणा धाति देवम | अध वायुं नियुतः सश्चत सवा उत शवेतं वसुधितिं निरेके	शरेष्ठं नो अद्य सवितर्वरेण्यं भागमा सुव स हिरत्नधा असि | रायो जनित्रीं धिषणामुप बरुवे सवस्त्यग्निं समिधानमीमहे	ā ghnā aghna ihāvase hotrāṃ yaviṣṭha bhāratīm | varūtrīṃ dhiṣaṇāṃ vaha	dhartā divo rajasas pṛṣṭa ūrdhvo ratho na vāyurvasubhirniyutvān | kṣapāṃ vastā janitā sūryasya vibhaktā bhāghaṃ dhiṣaṇeva vājam	ṛbhur vibhvā vāja indro no achemaṃ yajñaṃ ratnadheyopa yāta | idā hi vo dhiṣaṇā devy ahnām adhāt pītiṃ sam madā aghmatā vaḥ	abhi vo arce poṣyāvato nṝn vāstoṣ patiṃ tvaṣṭāraṃ rarāṇaḥ | dhanyā sajoṣā dhiṣaṇā namobhir vanaspatīṃr oṣadhī rāya eṣe	rāye nu yaṃ jajñatū rodasīme rāye devī dhiṣaṇā dhāti devam | adha vāyuṃ niyutaḥ saścata svā uta śvetaṃ vasudhitiṃ nireke	śreṣṭhaṃ no adya savitarvareṇyaṃ bhāghamā suva sa hiratnadhā asi | rāyo janitrīṃ dhiṣaṇāmupa bruve svastyaghniṃ samidhānamīmahe	Most youthful Agni, hither bring their Spouses, Hotra, Bharati, Varutri, Dhisana, for aid. Supporting heaven, the high back of the region, his car is Vayu with his team of Vasus. Illumining the nights, the Sun's creator, like Dhisana he deals forth strength and riches. To this our sacrifice come Rbhu, Vibhvan, Vaja, and Indra with the gift of riches, Because this day hath Dhisana the Goddess set drink for you: the gladdening draughts have reached you. You I extol, the nourishers of heroes bringing you gifts, Vastospati and Tvastar- Rich Dhisana accords through our obeisance - and Trees and Plants, for the swift gain of riches. The God whom both these worlds brought forth for riches, whom heavenly Dhisana for our wealth appointeth, His team of harnessed horses waits on Vayu, and, foremost, on the radiant Treasure-bearer. Send us to-day a portion choice and excellent, O Savitar, for thou art he who dealeth wealth. I cry to Dhisana, Mother of opulence. We pray to kindled Agni for felicity.
