= Takachiho, Miyazaki =

Takachiho 高千穂町
- Town
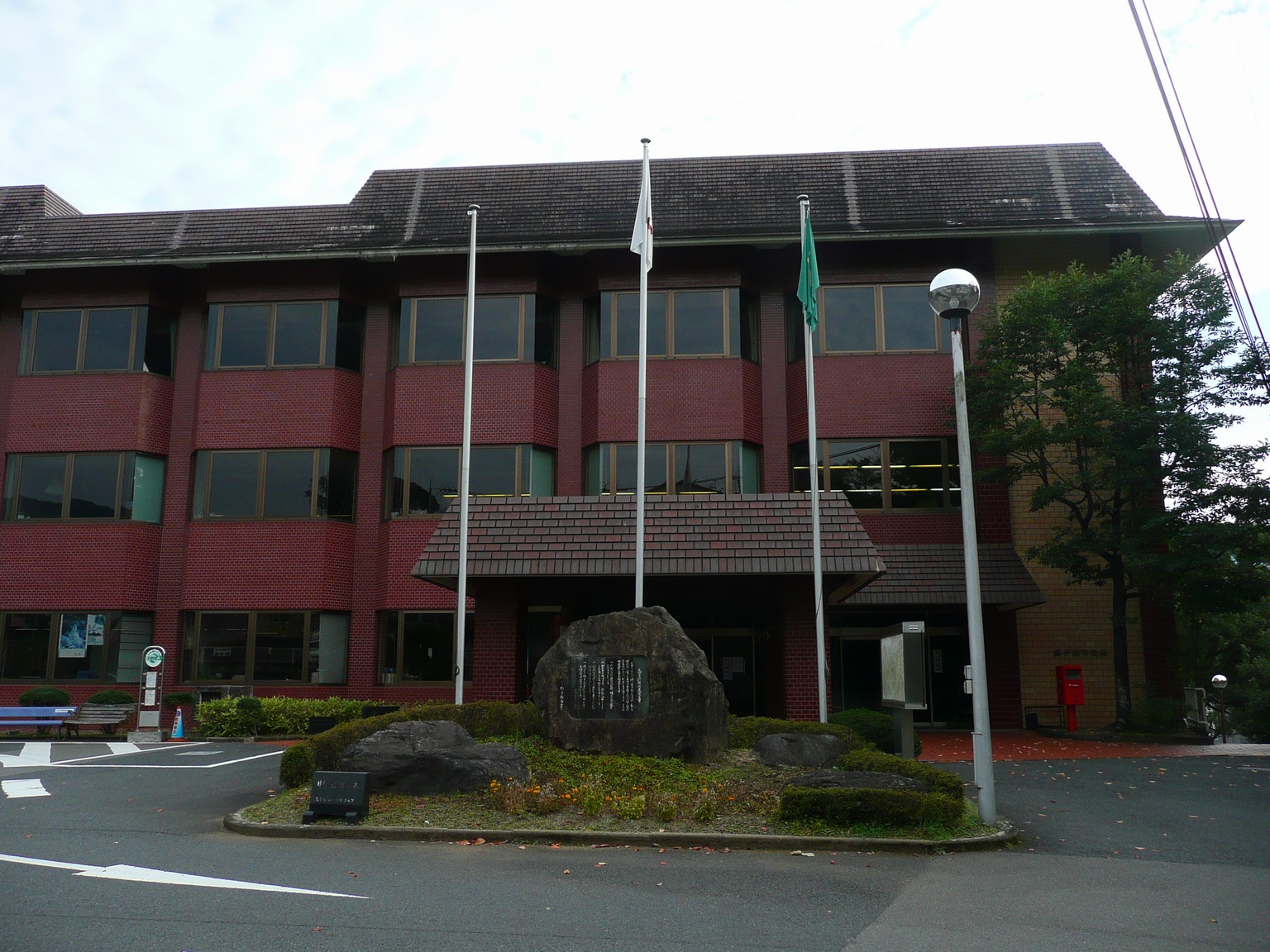
- Takachiho Town Office

- Flag Chapter
- Location of Takachiho in Miyazaki Prefecture

- Location within Japan Location within Miyazaki Prefecture
- Coordinates: 32°42′42″N 131°18′28″E
- Country: Japan
- Region: Kyushu
- Prefecture: Miyazaki
- District: Nishiusuki

Government
  - Mayor: Shingo Uchikura (内倉信吾)

Area
  - Total: 237.54 km^{2} (91.71 sq mi)

Population (October 1, 2023)
  - Total: 11,056
  - Density: 46.544/km^{2} (120.55/sq mi)
- Time zone: UTC+09:00 (JST)
- City hall address: 13 Ōaza Mitai, Takachiho-chō, Nishiusuki-gun, Miyazaki-ken 882-1192
- Climate: Cfa
- Website: Official website
- Symbols
- Bird: Meadow bunting
- Flower: Wisteria
- Tree: Ogatama-no-ki

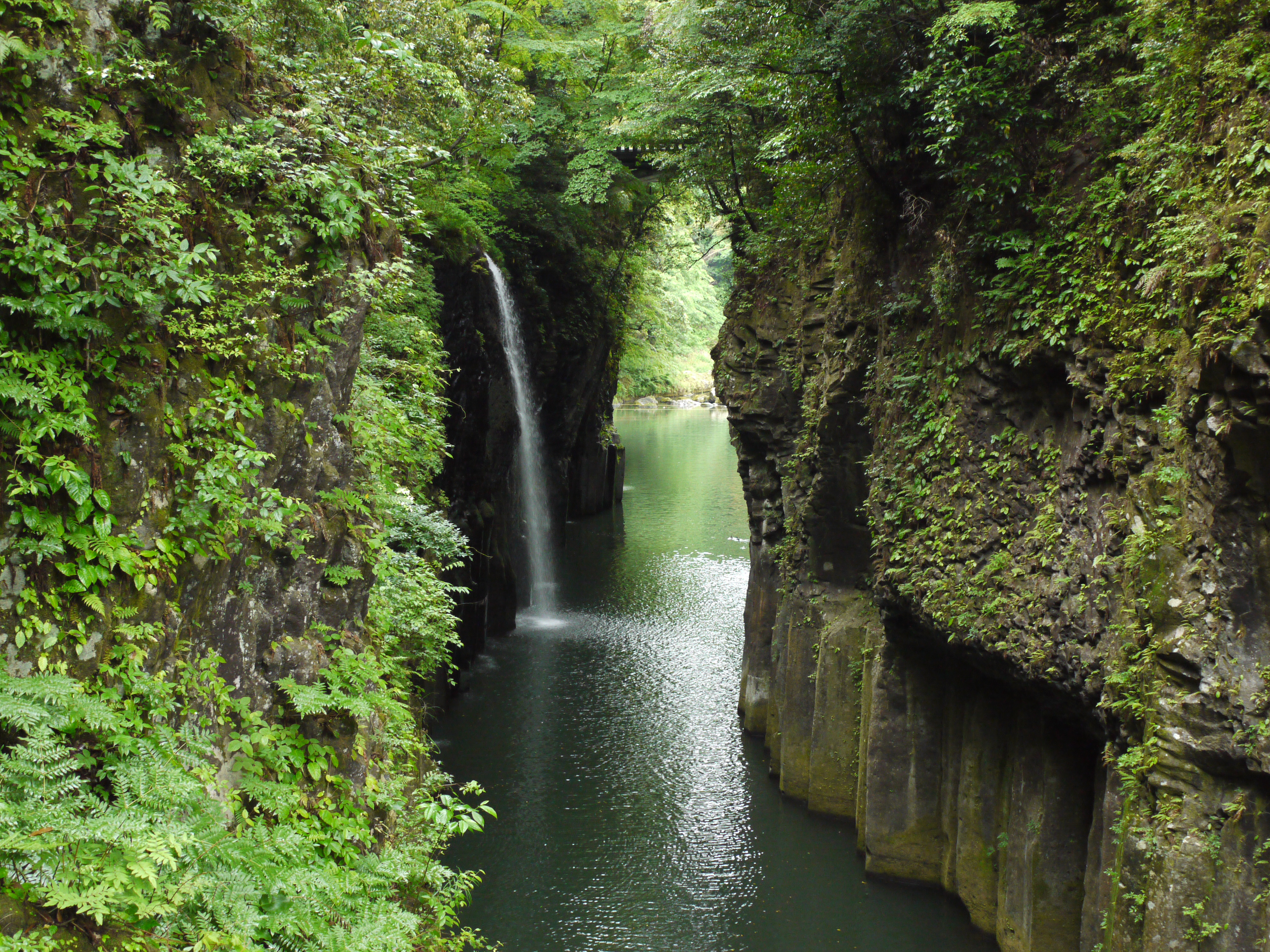
Manai Falls

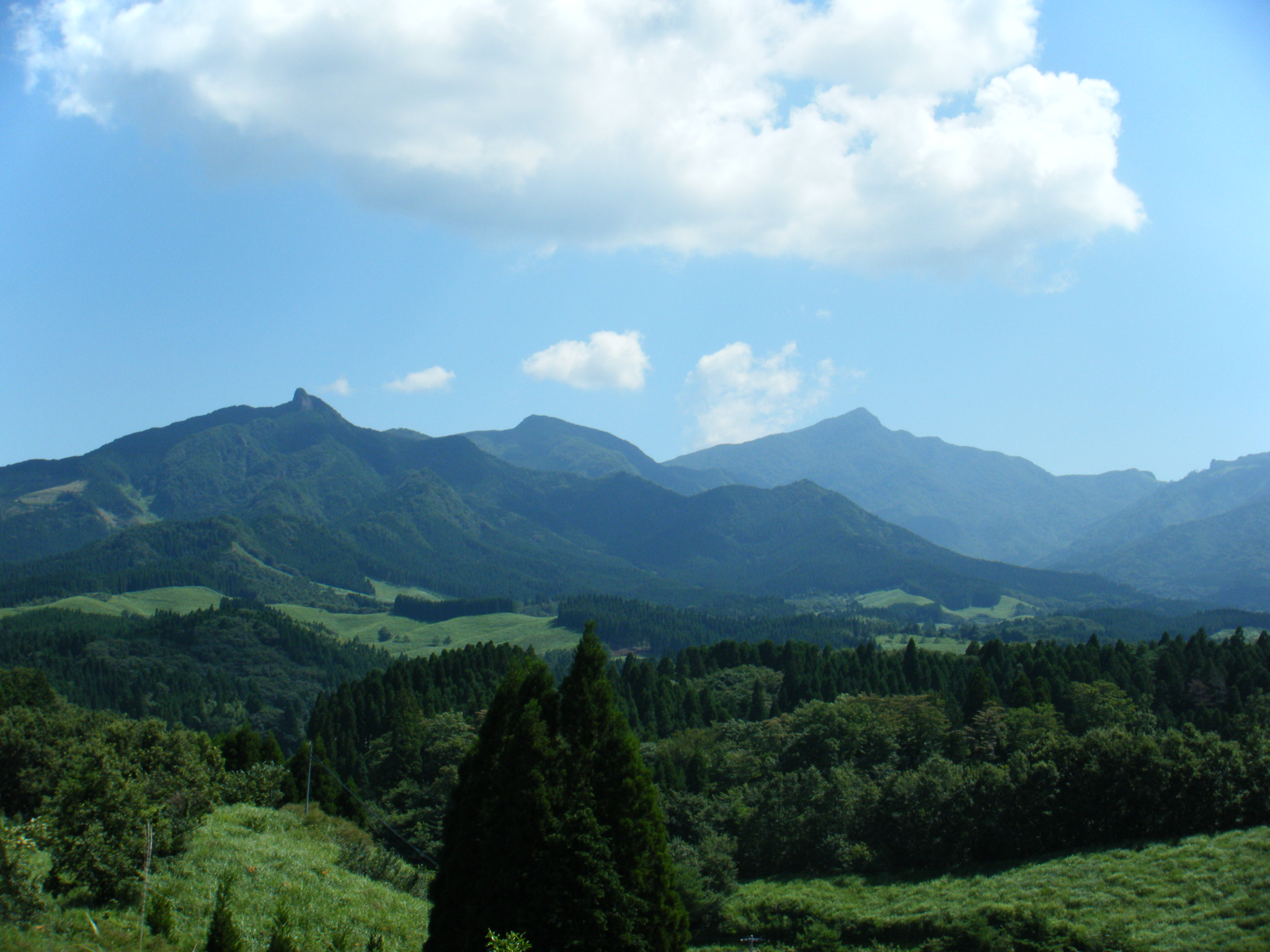
Mount Sobo

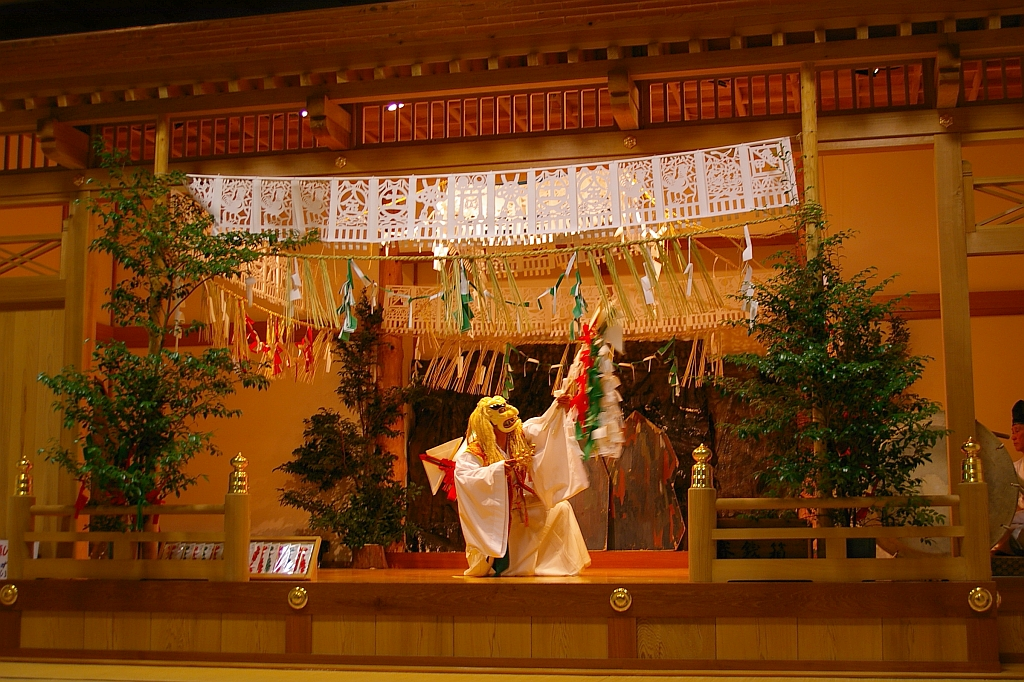
Yokagura

Takachiho (高千穂町, Takachiho-chō) is a town in Nishiusuki District, Miyazaki Prefecture, Japan. As of 1 October 2023, the town has an estimated population of 11,065 in 4865 households, and a population density of 47 persons per km^{2}. The total area of the town is 237.54 square kilometres (91.71 sq mi).

== Geography ==
Takachiho is in the northernmost part of Miyazaki Prefecture, in the Kyushu Mountains, bordering Kumamoto Prefecture on its north and northwest sides and Ōita Prefecture on its north and northeast sides. The 106-kilometer Gokase River flows from the west to the southeast part of town. Takachiho Gorge located slightly south of the town center, is a famous tourist destination. The urban center is around the now-defunct Takachiho Station and the business office of Takachiho Kotsu, the town's public transportation company, and is approximately 120 km northwest of Miyazaki, the prefectural capital, and approximately 80 km southeast of Kumamoto.

=== Neighboring municipalities ===
Kumamoto Prefecture

- Aso District: Takamori
- Kamimashiki District: Yamato

Miyazaki Prefecture

- Higashiusuki District: Morotsuka
- Nishiusuki District: Gokase, Hinokage

Ōita Prefecture

- Bungo-ōno
- Taketa

=== Climate ===
Takachiho has a humid subtropical climate (Köppen climate classification Cfa) with hot, humid summers and cool winters. The average annual temperature in Takachiho is 14.4 °C (57.9 °F). The average annual rainfall is 2,361.8 mm (92.98 in) with June as the wettest month. The temperatures are highest on average in August, at around 25.0 °C (77.0 °F), and lowest in January, at around 3.7 °C (38.7 °F). The highest temperature ever recorded in Takachiho was 38.0 °C (100.4 °F) on 2 August 2026; the coldest temperature ever recorded was −11.1 °C (12.0 °F) on 19 February 1977.

Climate data for Takachiho (1991−2020 normals, extremes 1977−present)
Month	Jan	Feb	Mar	Apr	May	Jun	Jul	Aug	Sep	Oct	Nov	Dec	Year
Record high °C (°F)	20.4 (68.7)	22.7 (72.9)	27.8 (82.0)	29.5 (85.1)	33.0 (91.4)	34.1 (93.4)	37.6 (99.7)	38.0 (100.4)	35.1 (95.2)	30.6 (87.1)	28.0 (82.4)	22.8 (73.0)	38.0 (100.4)
Mean daily maximum °C (°F)	9.3 (48.7)	11.1 (52.0)	14.9 (58.8)	20.0 (68.0)	24.1 (75.4)	26.0 (78.8)	29.8 (85.6)	30.6 (87.1)	27.5 (81.5)	22.8 (73.0)	17.2 (63.0)	11.5 (52.7)	20.4 (68.7)
Daily mean °C (°F)	3.7 (38.7)	5.0 (41.0)	8.4 (47.1)	13.2 (55.8)	17.6 (63.7)	20.9 (69.6)	24.7 (76.5)	25.0 (77.0)	21.8 (71.2)	16.2 (61.2)	10.6 (51.1)	5.4 (41.7)	14.4 (57.9)
Mean daily minimum °C (°F)	−1.0 (30.2)	−0.3 (31.5)	2.7 (36.9)	7.1 (44.8)	12.0 (53.6)	17.0 (62.6)	21.1 (70.0)	21.4 (70.5)	17.6 (63.7)	11.2 (52.2)	5.3 (41.5)	0.3 (32.5)	9.5 (49.2)
Record low °C (°F)	−9.7 (14.5)	−11.1 (12.0)	−6.6 (20.1)	−3.5 (25.7)	0.5 (32.9)	7.3 (45.1)	11.1 (52.0)	13.0 (55.4)	5.5 (41.9)	−0.4 (31.3)	−3.7 (25.3)	−8.2 (17.2)	−11.1 (12.0)
Average precipitation mm (inches)	59.7 (2.35)	80.4 (3.17)	121.9 (4.80)	126.6 (4.98)	164.2 (6.46)	419.5 (16.52)	403.1 (15.87)	324.5 (12.78)	380.7 (14.99)	145.1 (5.71)	78.2 (3.08)	57.9 (2.28)	2,361.8 (92.98)
Average precipitation days (≥ 1.0 mm)	7.0	8.7	11.7	10.8	10.5	16.0	14.1	13.6	12.1	8.0	7.5	7.1	127.1
Mean monthly sunshine hours	131.3	135.8	161.3	180.3	177.8	116.7	154.3	170.8	143.8	160.6	138.7	137.7	1,809.2
Source: Japan Meteorological Agency

=== Demographics ===
Per Japanese census data, the population of Takachiho in 2020 is 11,642 people. Takachiho has been conducting censuses since 1960.

Historical population
Year	Pop.	±%
1960	27,052	—
1965	24,757	−8.5%
1970	22,131	−10.6%
1975	20,523	−7.3%
1980	19,957	−2.8%
1985	19,170	−3.9%
1990	18,093	−5.6%
1995	16,780	−7.3%
2000	15,843	−5.6%
2005	14,778	−6.7%
2010	13,723	−7.1%
2015	12,755	−7.1%
2020	11,642	−8.7%
Takachiho population statistics

== History ==
The area of Takachiho was part of ancient Hyūga Province. It features prominently in Japanese mythology as the land where Ninigi descended from the heavens, sent by Amaterasu, the sun goddess. It contains the Ama-no-Iwato shrine which is, according to myth, the location of the cave where Amaterasu hid until Ame-no-Uzume lured her out. From the late Heian period into the Sengoku period, the area was controlled by the Kikuchi clan, which was associated with Aso Shrine in Higo Province. The area later was contested between the Shimazu clan of Satsuma Province and the Otomo clan of Bungo Province. After the establishment of the Tokugawa shogunate, it was part of the holdings of Nobeoka Domain. The village of Takachiho within Nishiusuki District, Miyazaki was established on April 1, 1889 with the creation of the modern municipalities system. Takachiho was raised to town status on April 1, 1920. Around 1920, arsenopyrite was mined in the northern part of the town, and the production of arsenite supported the town's economy until the mine was closed in 1962. On September 30, 1956 Takachiho annexed the neighboring towns of Iwato and Tahara, followed by the town of Ueno April 1, 1969.

During World War Two, the 2nd Raiding Brigade trained in the town and were sometimes known as the Takachiho paratroopers.

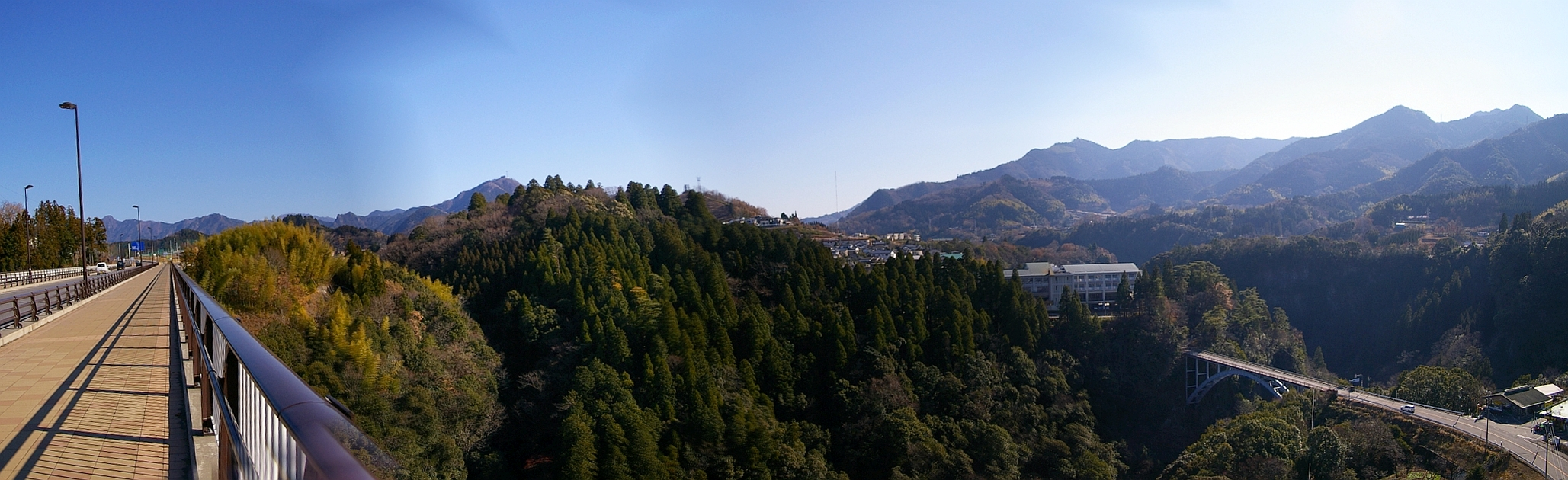
View of Takachiho

== Economy ==
The main industry of Takachiho are agriculture, forestry and tourism. The town is noted for its rice terraces.

== Education ==
Takachiho has five public elementary schools and two public junior high schools operated by the town government and one public high school operated by the Miyazaki Prefectural Board of Education. The prefecture also operates one special education school for the handicapped.

== Transportation ==
=== Railways ===
Takachiho has no passenger rail service. The nearest train station is Takamori on the Minamiaso Railway Takamori Line or Tateno on the JR Kyushu Hōhi Main Line. The town was formerly served by the 50.0 Takachiho Railway, which ran from Nobeoka to Takachiho Station, with one intermediate stations within Takachiho. Services were discontinued on September 6, 2005, after flooding triggered by Typhoon Nabi washed away two bridges on the line, halting all operations. Efforts to obtain funding for rebuilding were unsuccessful, and the company was liquidated in 2009.

=== Highways ===
- Kyushu Chūō Expressway
- National Route 218
- National Route 325

== Local attractions ==
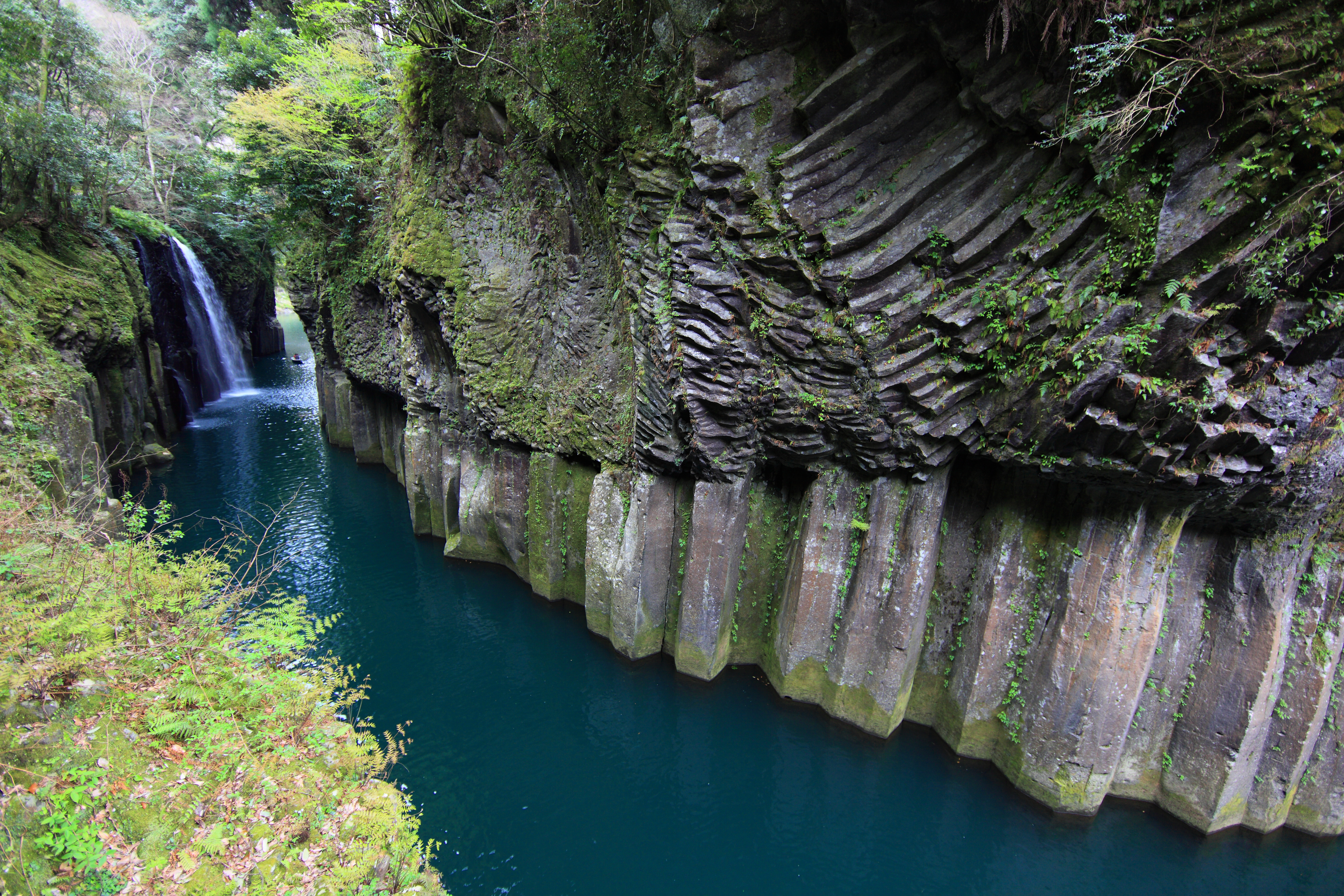
Takachiho-kyo (gorge) with Manai Falls

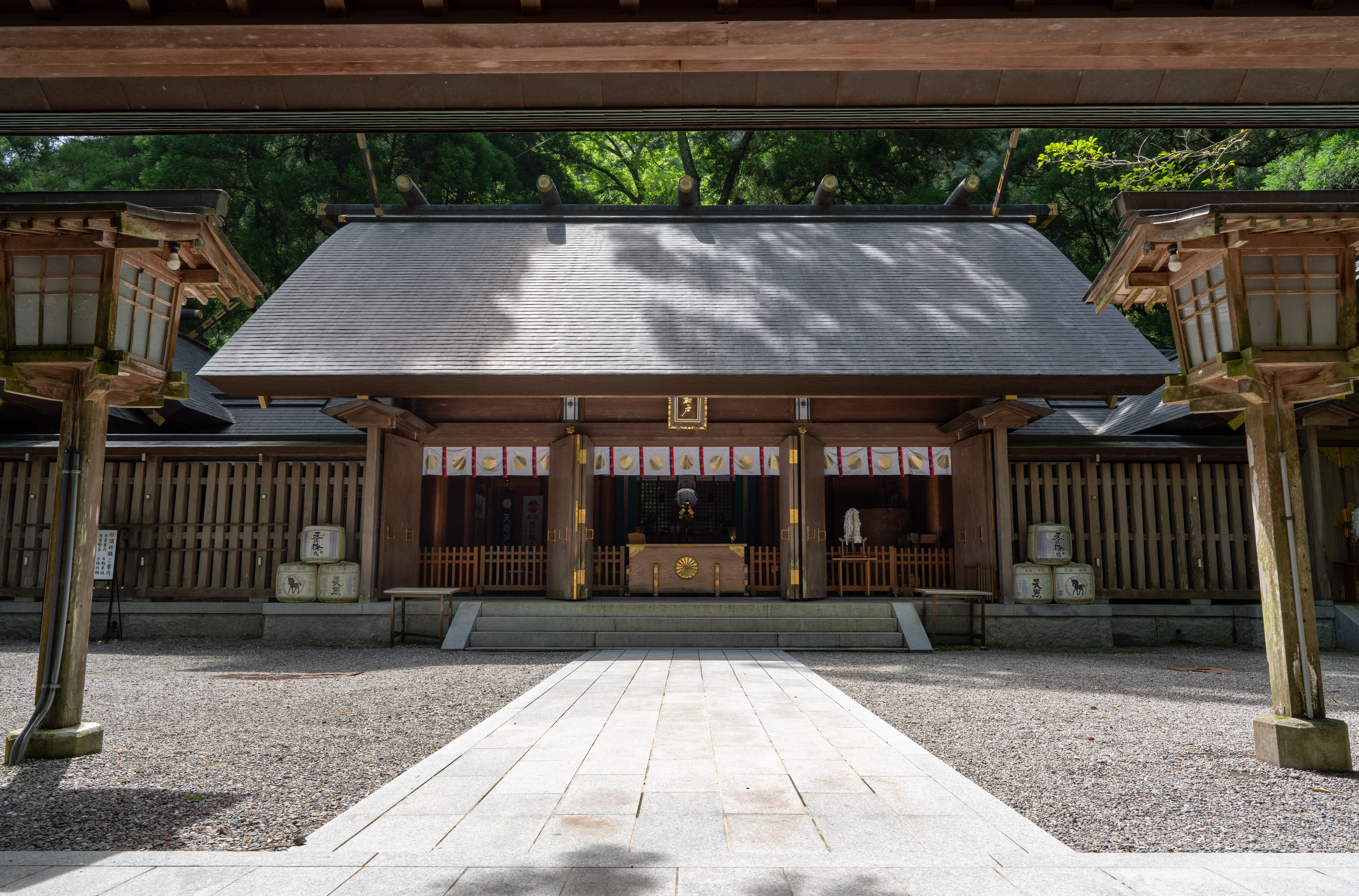
Main hall of Amanoiwato-jinja

Takachiho is the heart of the Himuka Myth Road, which extends throughout Miyazaki.

- Amanoiwato-jinja
- Kunimigaoka
- Shonen-ji
- Takachiho Gorge
  - Manai Waterfall
- Takachiho Onsen
- Takachiho Shrine

== In popular culture ==
Takachiho is featured in the manga and anime series Oshi no Ko, as the location of the hospital where Ai Hoshino gave birth to her twins and main characters of the series, Aquamarine and Ruby Hoshino.
