= Nishiusuki District, Miyazaki =

District in Miyazaki prefecture, Japan

Coordinates: 32.684°N 131.322°E

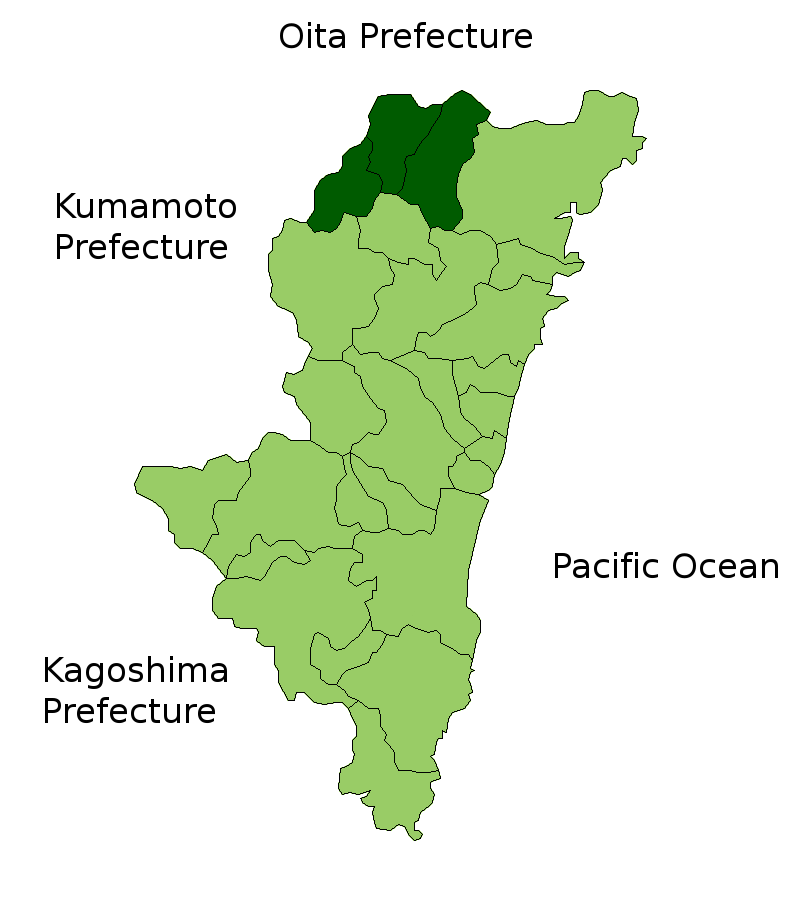
Nishiusuki District in Miyazaki Prefecture

Nishiusuki (西臼杵郡, Nishiusuki-gun) is a district located in Miyazaki Prefecture, Japan.

As of October 2020, the district has an estimated population of 18,749 and the density of 27.29 persons per km^{2}. The total area is 686.94 km^{2}.

== Towns and villages ==
- Gokase
- Hinokage
- Takachiho
