= Saitobaru Kofun Cluster =

Megalithic tombs in Miyazaki, Japan

Coordinates: 32°07′04″N 131°23′22″E

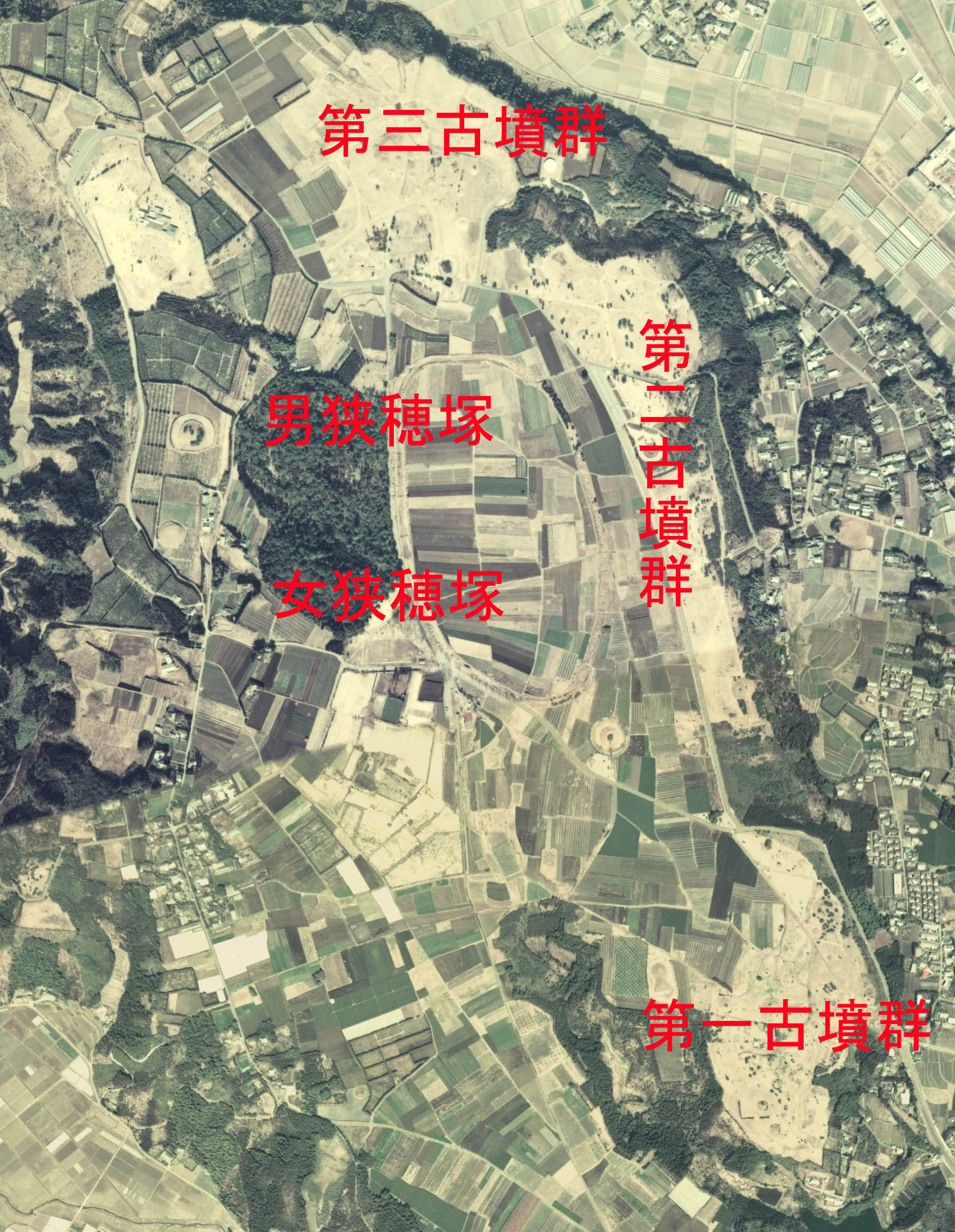
Saitobaru kofungun,upper;the 3rd group, left upper;Osahozuka, left lower;Mesahozuka, right central;2nd group, right lower;1st group

Saitobaru Kofun Cluster (Japanese: 西都原古墳群) is a group of three hundred thirty three kofuns or tumuli in Saito city, Miyazaki Prefecture, Japan. This is one of the largest kofun groups in Japan, and the largest group in Kyushu situated on a 70-meter hill composed of diluvium. It is located within the Saitobaru-Sugiyasukyō Prefectural Natural Park.

== General description ==
The Saitobaru Kofun Cluster or Burial Mounds were designated by the national government as a special historical site in 1952. The majority of the tumuli in Saitobaru have yet to be excavated and many remain wrapped in a veil of mystery. There are 311 elevated mounds, (31 keyhole-shaped mound (zenpo-koenfun (前方後円墳), unique to ancient Japan, 1 Square Kofun (方墳）, 279 circular type (empun (円墳)), kofuns) and 10 Corridor-type kofun (横穴) kofuns and 12 underground kofuns, the last being peculiar to southern Kyushu. The first scientific excavation was made in 1912. In 1952, Saito City Museum was founded, which was later changed to Miyazaki Prefectural Saitobaru Archaeological Museum.

== Important Kofuns ==
=== Osahozuka and Mesahozuka ===
- Osahozuka kofun is the Japan's largest hotatekai-shaped kofun, 175 meters long.
- Mesahozuka kofun is a 180-meter-long zenpo-koenfun. Both belong to Emperor-related kofuns.

=== Himezuka Kofun ===
- A 50-meter-long keyhole-shaped kofun, one of the most beautiful kofuns encircled by a moat and had precious treasures such as swords, vases, glass-balls inside. It was assumed to be built in the early 6th century.

=== Oninoiwaya Kofun ===
It was the only sideway kofun which was completely encircled by an earthwork (archaeology). This is unique and reminds one of kofuns in China.

== Festival ==
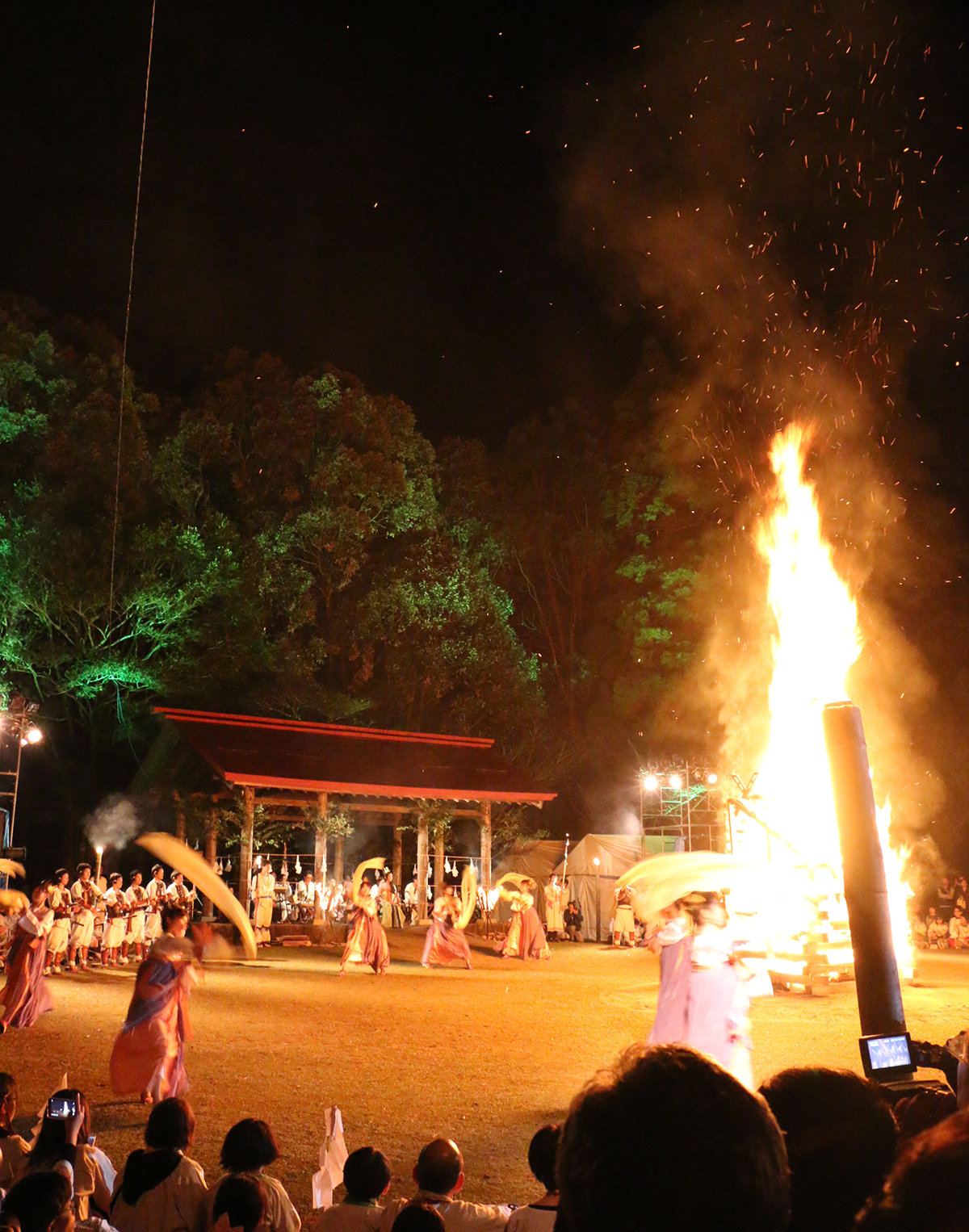
Dance at the festival

There is an annual festival in november dedicated to the Kofun cluster. It is held every November and features a torchlight procession of several hundred people marching along the Kiki no Michi. It aims to celebrate the mythical past of the region and the tombs.

== Kiki no Michi ==
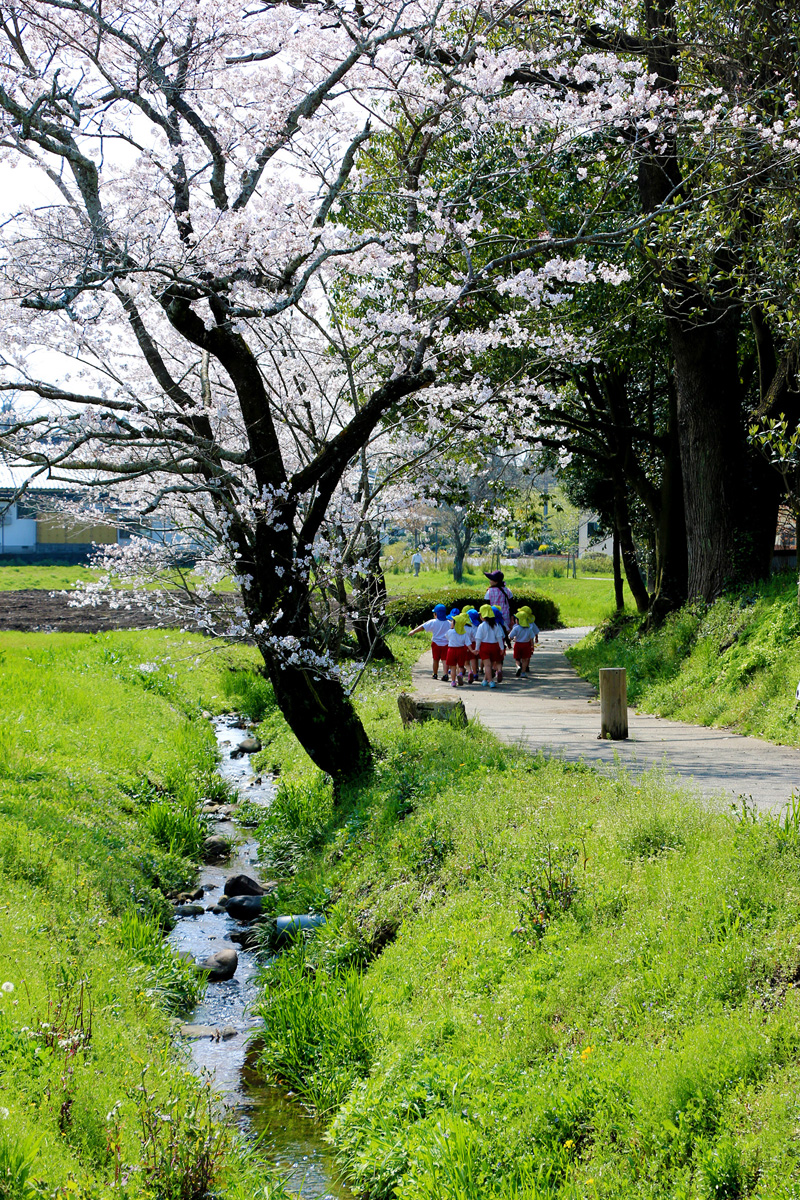
Cherry blossoms are in full bloom on the Kiki no Michi

The Kiki no Michi (記紀の道; lit: Kiki path) is a walking path that surrounds the Kofun cluster with a total length of about 4 kilometers (km). Kiki is an abbreviation that refers to the Kojiki and Nihon Shoki, and the Kiki no Michi connects places of historical interest related to the Hyūga Myth described in these documents. The path travels near Saitobaru Kofun Cluster's male and female mounds and travels through the place where, according to legend, Konohanasakuya-hime and Ninigi-no-Mikoto are said to have spent their married life together. However, there are several places in Miyazaki Prefecture that are said to be the setting of the same story.

The legend of the Kiki no Michi can be seen in the "Illustrated Map of the Jindai" completed in 1823 by Kokugaku scholar Sanemitsu Kodama, which provides evidence that the path already existed at that time. In addition, the dense presence of the kofun and other historical sites along the Kiki no Michi suggests that this area was the political, economic, and cultural center of ancient Hyūga.。 Several toponyms in the vicinity are thought to have their roots in Hyūga mythology, such as "Tsuma", "Koyu", "Sakamoto", "Ishinuki", and "Dojimaru". "Koyu no Ike", located in this area, is said to have been the origin of the current name of Koyu-gun.。There is also a theory that the land of Tsuman (Tsuma) is identical to Toumakoku mentioned in Wajinden, which would show that the area was mentioned in historical books other than the Chronicles of Japan.

The entire area is a prefectural bird and animal sanctuary, and parts of it overlap with the Kyushu Nature Trail, creating a landscape where nature and human settlements coexist.

The Saito Kofun Festival, held every November, features a torchlight procession of several hundred people marching along the Kiki no Michi.

On 24 May 2018, the Saitobaru Kofun Cluster and other tombs in the surrounding area were featured by the Agency for Cultural Affairs of the Japanese Government in a story on their website titled "Monuments of Ancient People – Painting on the Plateau: Kofun Landscape of Miyazaki in Southern Japan". A link to the Kiki no Michi is included in the story as a cultural property of this heritage site.。

The path received the 2019 Handmade Hometown Award titled "Kiki no Michi: Connecting Local Treasures to Nurture the Heart". It also won the 2019 Good Design Award for its efforts to protect local residents' traditional landscapes.

=== Sites of lore ===
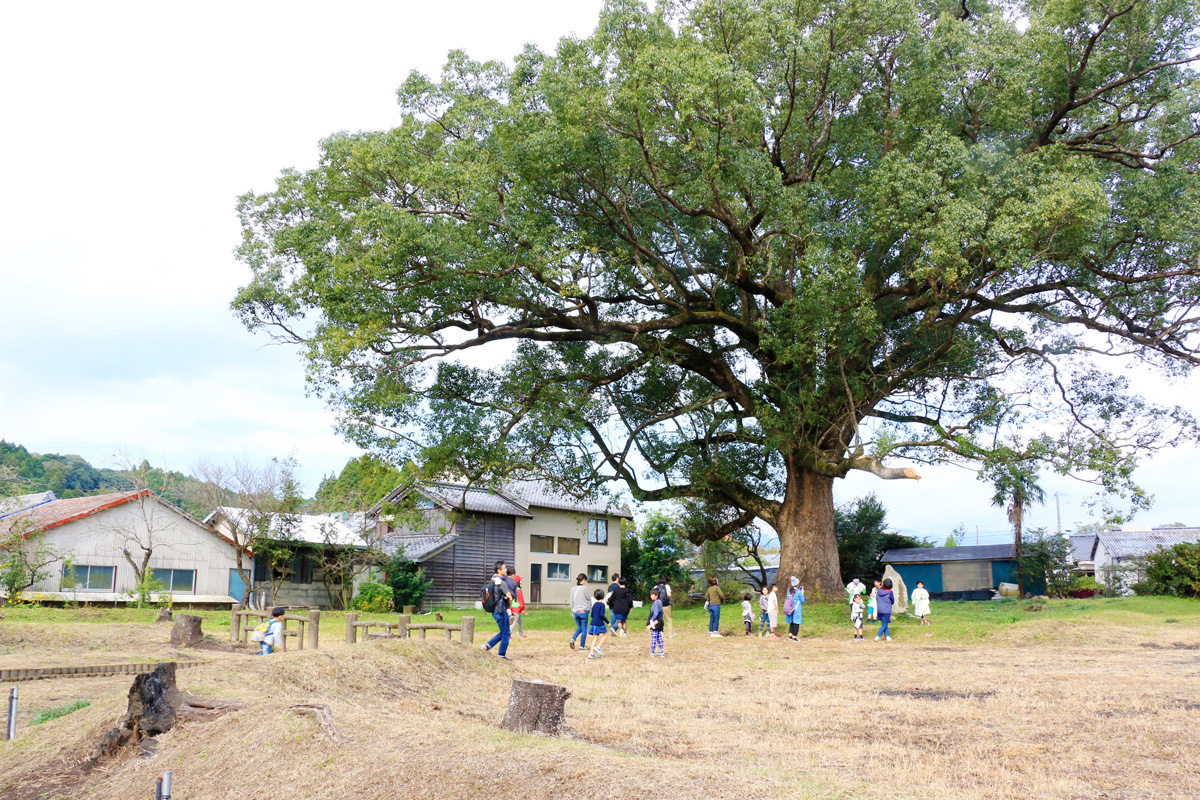
Ruins of a room with no door and a huge camphor tree

A series of ten lore sites are located along the Kiki no Michi, and several lore sites are scattered just off the Kiki no Michi as well.

==== Lore sites along the Kiki no Michi ====
- Toman Shrine
- Mifunezuka
- Aizomegawa River
- Yahiro-dono (Yahiro-den) site
- Ruins of Mutsu Muro
- Pond of Kodu
- Ishinuki Shrine
- Oyamakizuka Mound
- Oni no grotto
- Male and female mounds

==== Other places of lore ====
- Miyake Shrine
- Sasanuki Shrine
- Kakishozuka Shrine
- Dojimaru Shrine
- Ono of Tango-no Ono

=== Historic Sites and Natural Monuments ===
- Saitobaru Kofun Cluster Special Historic Site – In addition to the Saitobaru Plateau, 25 round mounds are scattered among houses and fields in an area known as the Middle Territory, where underground horizontal burial mounds have also been discovered. (Dogashima Branch Group)
- Hyūga Kokufu Ruins (National Historic Site)
- Tsuma no Kusu (Prefecturally-designated natural monument)
- Ogatama tree in Terasaki area cemetery (city-designated natural monument) – a huge Magnolia compressa specimen. It is described as an "ogatama tree" in the "Jindai no Ezu" where it is depicted as a considerably large tree. The tree has a circumference of 3.9m, a height of 15m, and an estimated age of 310 years.

== See also ==
- Japan Heritage
- Shinto texts
- Kofun
- List of Special Places of Scenic Beauty, Special Historic Sites and Special Natural Monuments
- List of National Treasures of Japan (archaeological materials)
- Cultural Properties of Japan#Buried Cultural Properties
- History of Miyazaki Prefecture
