= Saitobaru-Sugiyasukyō Prefectural Natural Park =

Prefectural Natural Park in Miyazaki Prefecture, Japan

- 西都原杉安峡県立自然公園
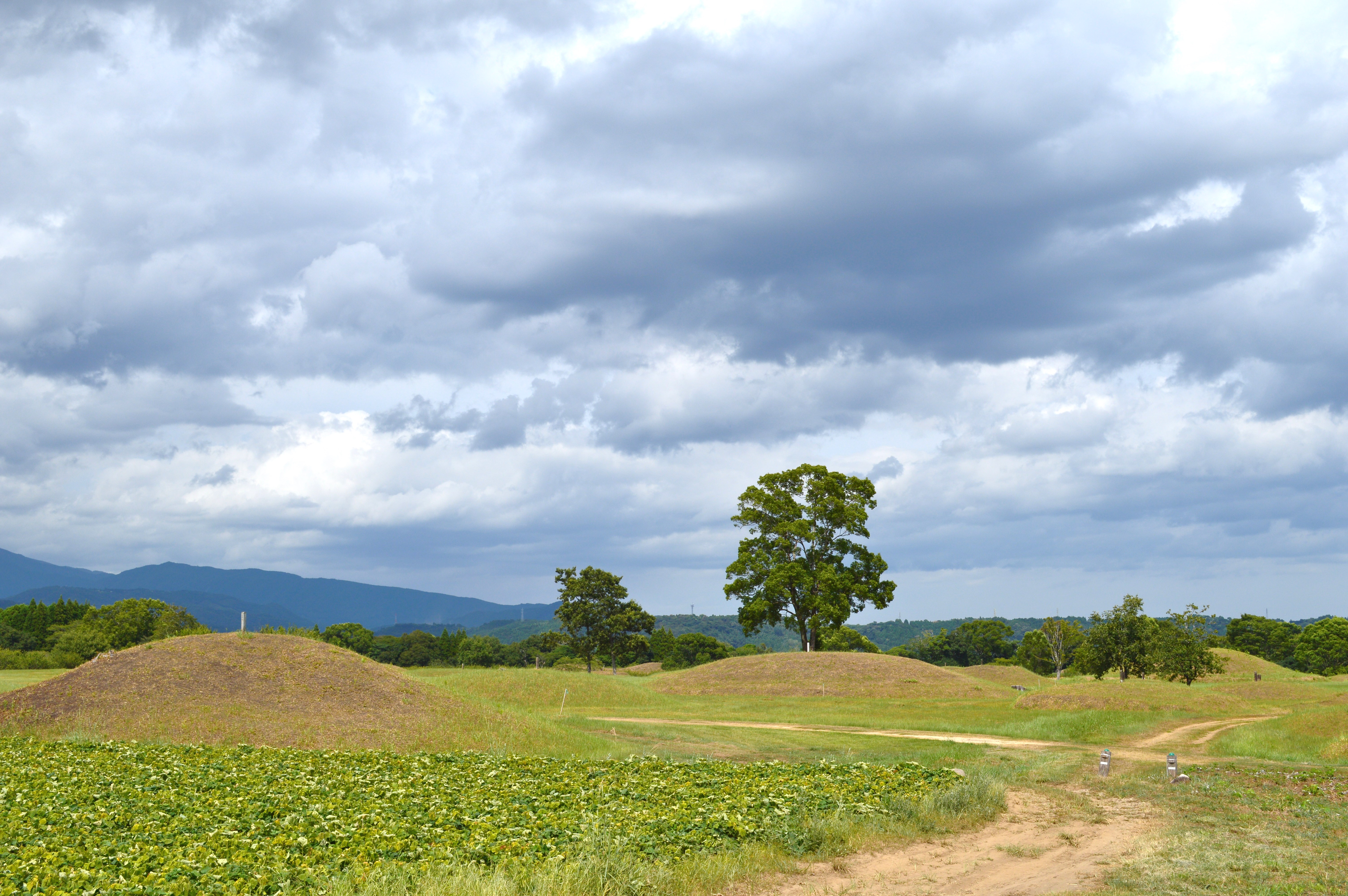
- Interactive map of Saitobaru-Sugiyasukyō Prefectural Natural Park
- Location: Miyazaki Prefecture, Japan
- Area: 8.48 km^{2} (3.27 sq mi)
- Established: 1 September 1958

Saitobaru-Sugiyasukyō Prefectural Natural Park (西都原杉安峡県立自然公園, Saitobaru-Sugiyasukyō kenritsu shizen kōen) is a Prefectural Natural Park in central Miyazaki Prefecture, Japan. Established in 1958, the park is within the municipality of Saito. The park encompasses the Saitobaru tumulus cluster and the Sugiyasu Gorge (杉安峡), celebrated for its momiji.

== See also ==
- National Parks of Japan
