= History of Miyazaki Prefecture =

This is an outline of the history of Miyazaki Prefecture.

== Etymology ==
It was in Wamyō Ruijushō that Miyazaki first appeared in Japanese documents as one of the names of 5 guns (subprefecture) in Miyazaki. According to the History of Miyazaki Prefecture by Tsugiyoshi Hidaka Miyazaki might be the place where Emperor Jinmu, the mythological first emperor, lived, or the place of Miya, or his place.

== Prehistoric Miyazaki ==
- Teeth of Elephas naumanni were excavated at Tonokoori, Saito city. (300,000 years ago to 20,000 years ago)
- Gomuta archaeological site of Kawaminami was in the mid-Paleolithic era, and was 33,000 years ago.
- 25,000 years ago; many archaeological sites of the latter Paleolithic era are distributed around Gokase river and Miyazaki plain.
- 12,000 years ago; nail-shaped earthenwares and elevated-line earthernwares, stone axes were excavated from Douchi archaeological site.
- 10,000 years ago, in the early Jōmon period, the sealine rose 5 meters high because of weather warming. There were Onuki shellheap site, Kashiwada shellheap site; Atoe shellheap site of Miyazaki presented dugout (shelter), dokoubo tomb (of burial; the act of placing a person or object into the ground) and various stone tools were seen.
- 6,400 years ago; Kigai Caldera erupted in Kagoshima Prefecture, and earthenwares are classified before and after the eruption.
- 4,000 years ago; Jinnai archaeological site in Takachiho showed signs of earliest farming.
- 3,000 years ago; there was Shimozuru archaeological site in Togo town.
- 3rd century B.C. parts of bronze mirror were excavated from Jindaigasako site.

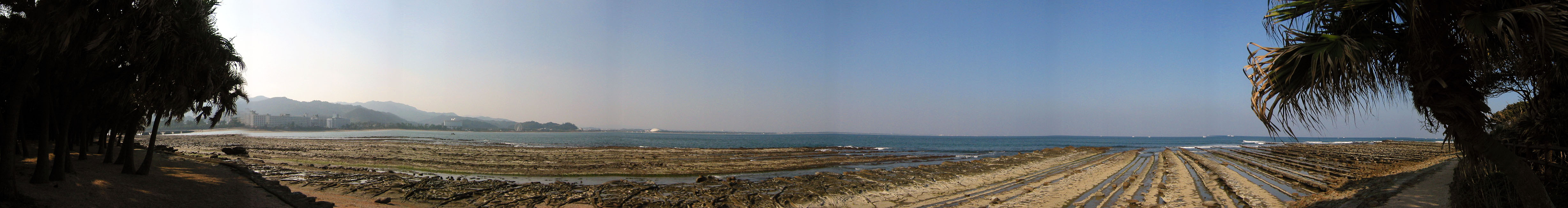
Aoshima of Miyazaki, a panorama of the "Ogre's Washboard"

== Saitobaru Burial Mounds ==
- Saitobaru kofungun is a group of three hundred thirty three kofuns or tumuli in Saito city, Miyazaki Prefecture, Japan. This is the largest kofun group in Japan, situated on a 70-meter hill composed of diluvium.

== Yamato Ouken and Miyazaki ==
Expanding Yamato Ouken(green) around the 7th century;Miyazaki Prefecture is in eastern southern Kyushu

There are various Japanese names for a political/governmental organization present starting in the third century of kofun period in Kinki area of Japan, composed of several powerful families, with Ō (king) or Ōkimi (great king) as its center. These names include Yamato Chōtei (Court), Yamato Ōken, Wa Ōken, and Yamato Seiken. At the same time, there are views that the presence of smaller regional states should be respected. There is a view that Chōtei (Court) should not be used before the 4th and 5th century. At the present time, Yamato Ōken is tentatively used here. In the mythologies of country production, Miyazaki appeared as a part of Kumaso in Kyushu, but not as a unified force but it is considered to be a part of Kumaso-controlled area. By and by, the force of Yamato Ōken infiltrated from the Ōita area southward. According to Nihon Shoki, a Japanese document, the offspring of Prince Toyokuniwake, who followed Emperor Keikō, became the top of Hyūga, or agata-nushi, at Morokara.

== Hyūga ==
After the establishment of the Ritsuryō system, the country of Hyūga had been called Himuka, facing the east. The control of Yamato Ōken was not strong, and in 702, Satsuma country, and in 713, Ōsumi country was separated, thus the country of Hyūga was determined. These countries were under the strong control of Yamato Ōken, or Dazaifu. In 815, there were 500 soldiers of the Yamato Ōken, and comparison of soldiers revealed more lower class soldiers than in other countries.

== Kamakura period ==
=== Shimazu Tadahisa, the founder of the Shimazu Samurai clan ===
In 1185, Shimazu Tadahisa (died August 1, 1227) was the founder of the Shimazu samurai clan. The Shimazu clan had become the daimyō of Satsuma and Ōsumi domains of Kagoshima and Hyuga country. He went to Satsuma in 1196, subdued Hyuga and Osumi provinces, and built a castle in the domain of Shimazu (Hyūga) which name he also adopted. He is buried in Kamakura, near his father's tomb.

=== Muromachi Period and Nanbokucho Period ===
Strongmen in Hyuga were Tsuchimochi, Ito, Kitahara and Shimazu, Hongo and Niiro. These strongmen fought against their enemies. Finally, Shimazu was most powerful, until the time of their defeat by Toyotomi Hideyoshi in 1587. Then Hyuga was given to various daimyōs who fought for Hideyoshi.

== Edo Period ==
In the Edo period, Hyuga was divided into many hans; the greatest was the Satsuma han of Kagoshima which belonged to Shimazu clan. Other hans included Nobeoka han, Takanabe han, Sadowara han and Obi han.

=== Nobeoka Han ===
- In 1587, Takahashi Mototane was given this area (Nobeoka, Takachiho, Miyazaki, Honjo and Hokita) and built Agata (Nobeoka) Castle. 53,000 koku. Later, Arima Naozumi, Miura Akihiro and Makino Nario were given this area respectively but they did not govern this area continuously. In 1747, Naito Masaki was given this area and his family continued to the end of Edo period. 70,000 koku.

=== Takanabe Han ===
- In 1587, Akizuki Saburo was given this area. 30,000 koku. Takanabe han continued to the end of the han system.

=== Sadowara Han ===
- In 1577, Shimazu Iehisa entered Sadowara Castle, and the possession of his land was assured in 1588. In 1603, Shimazu Yukihisa entered the Sadowara Castle. 30,000 koku. The han continued to the termination of the han system. Sadowara town was composed of areas samurais lived and townspeople lived. Sadowara clay dolls were produced.

=== The Itō clan and Obi Han ===
The Itō-family were a Japanese clan that claimed descent from the medieval warrior Itō Suketoki. The family became a moderate power both in influence and ability by the latter Sengoku Period of Feudal Japan. The Itō family survived through the Muromachi Period, and remained a powerful clan well into the Sengoku period. The Itō family's most serious rivals in this period were the Shimazu. The Shimazu clan, which had unified Satsuma Province and Ōsumi Province under their control, began to clash with the Itō in 1570. The Itō were finally defeated by the Shimazu in 1578. The family followed Toyotomi Hideyoshi's invasion of Kyushu and Itoh Suketake won the land of Obi, now Nichinan which became the Obi Domain. 23,000 koku which became 40,500 koku and a peak of 57,816 koku.

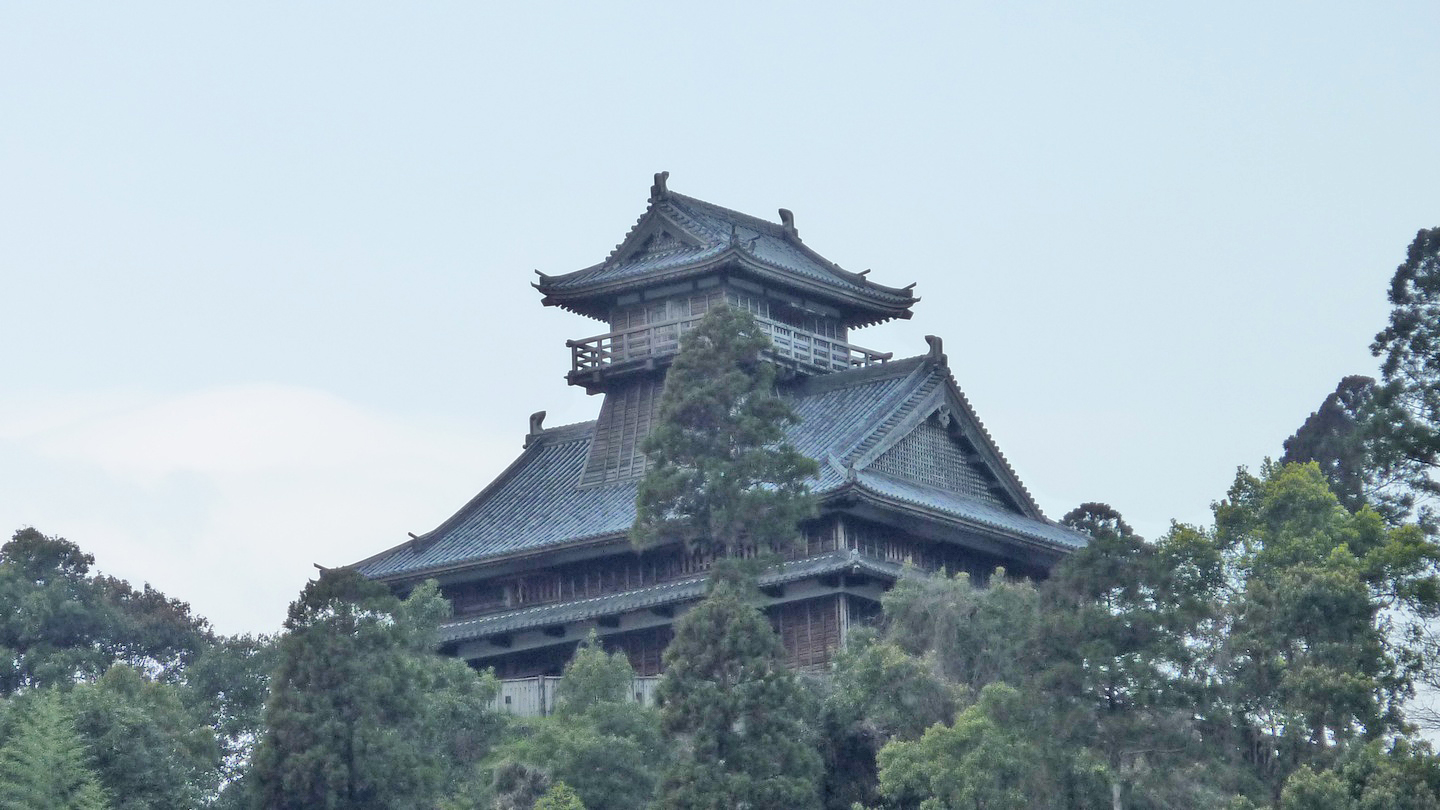
Aya Castle 1331–1615, mountain castle, once one of the 48 castles of Ito clan

=== The Shimazu clan and Miyazaki ===
The Shimazu clan, the tozama daimyo, was a powerful clan and its territory spanned the provinces of Satsuma, Osumi and the south-west region of Hyūga, and had the Ryūkyū Kingdom as a vassal state. The territory is largely contiguous with today's Kagoshima prefecture, and parts of Miyazaki prefecture.

== Meiji Era ==
Miyazaki Prefecture was placed, but it was made a part of Kagoshima Prefecture once. In 1883, Hyuga was separated from Kagoshima Prefecture, naming it Miyazaki Prefecture. A part of previously Hyuga remained in the Kagoshima Prefecture.

=== Peculiarities of the capital of Miyazaki Prefecture ===
- The area of Miyazaki City had been an exclave of Ito clan, Nobeoka han, Obi han, Kagoshima han, Takanabe han, Tenryo (shogunate governed) depending on the time and areas. Therefore, a deserted village of Kamibeppu Mura was chosen as the site of the prefectural building in 1873. It was very lonely, and it was said that badgers and foxes lived there. The name of the prefecture was from the Miyazaki gun of the village.
- Almost all sites of the prefectural capital cities are the so-called castle towns. Miyazaki and Hokkaido are exceptions.
- The development of Miyazaki Prefecture was very slow. People from other prefectures were invited to live there.

== Miyazaki Shrine and Hakko Ichiu Monument ==
Miyazaki-jingū 宮崎神宮
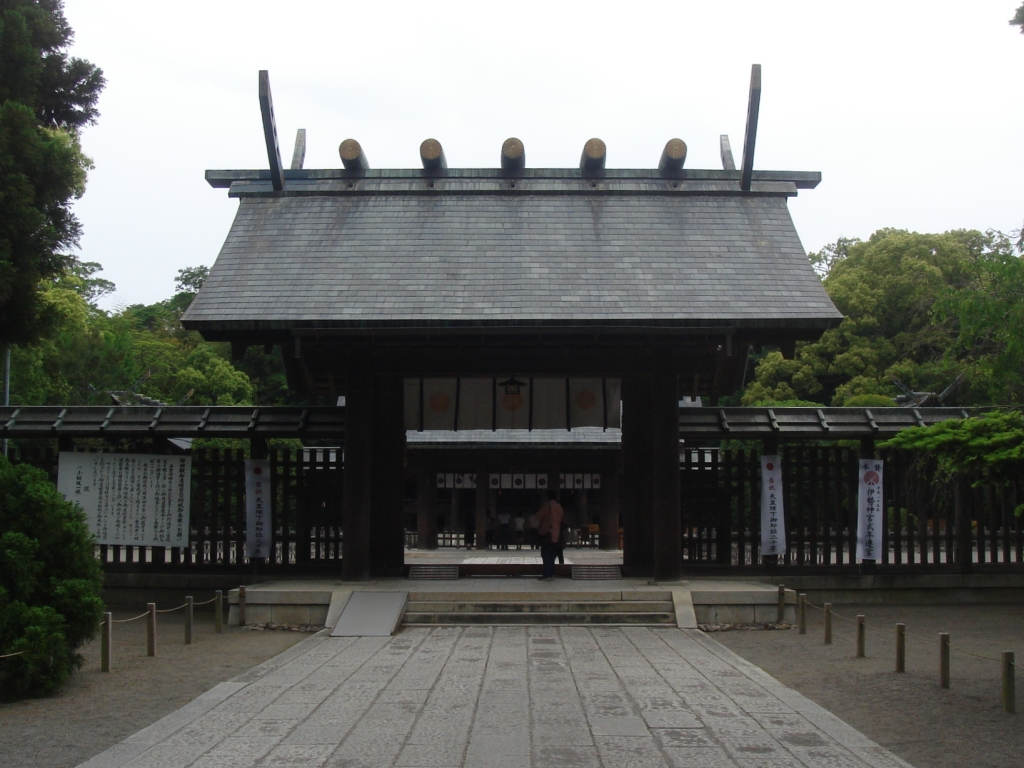

Religion
- Affiliation: Shinto
- Deity: Jinmu; Ugayafukiaezu; Damayoribime

Location
- Location: 2-4-1, Jingū, Miyazaki; Miyazaki 880-0053

Website
- miyazakijingu.jp

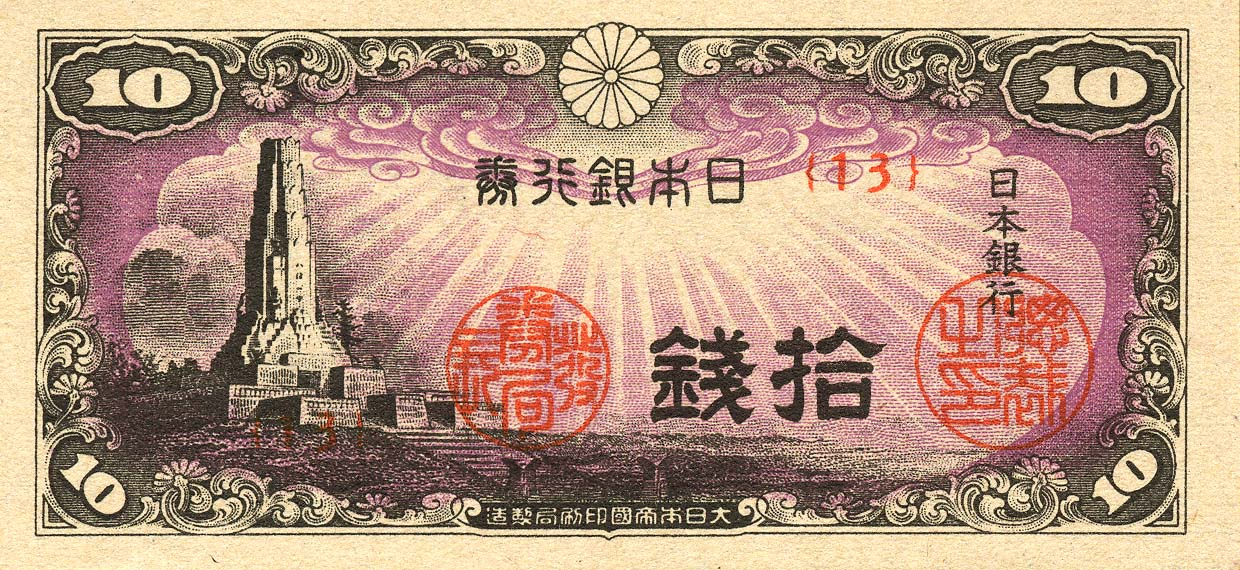
Prewar 10-sen Japanese banknote, illustrating the Hakkō ichiu monument in Miyazaki

- Miyazaki-jingū in which Emperor Jimmu was enshrined was established and enlarged in Miyazaki City. The Imperial house of Japan traditionally based its claim to the throne on its descent from Jimmu. No firm dates can be assigned to this early emperor's life or reign, nor for the reigns of his early successors. Most modern historians dismiss this entire period as being beyond what history can know.
- Hakkō ichiu (八紘一宇, "eight cords, one roof" i.e. "all the world under one roof") was a Japanese political slogan that became popular from the Second Sino-Japanese War to World War II, and was popularized in a speech by Prime Minister of Japan Fumimaro Konoe on January 8, 1940.

== Atarashiki-mura movement ==
- Atarashiki-mura, "New Village", is a Japanese intentional community founded by the author, artist and philosopher Saneatsu Mushanokōji. It was founded in 1918 in Hyūga, in the mountains of Miyazaki Prefecture in Kyūshū. Work in the village and do creative work was their motto. In 1939 they were warned that much of their land was about to be submerged by the construction of a dam, so they searched for a new home and found 10 hectares in Moroyama-machi, Iruma-gun, Saitama Prefecture. A few members remain at Hyūga.

== Sightseeing and Miyazaki ==
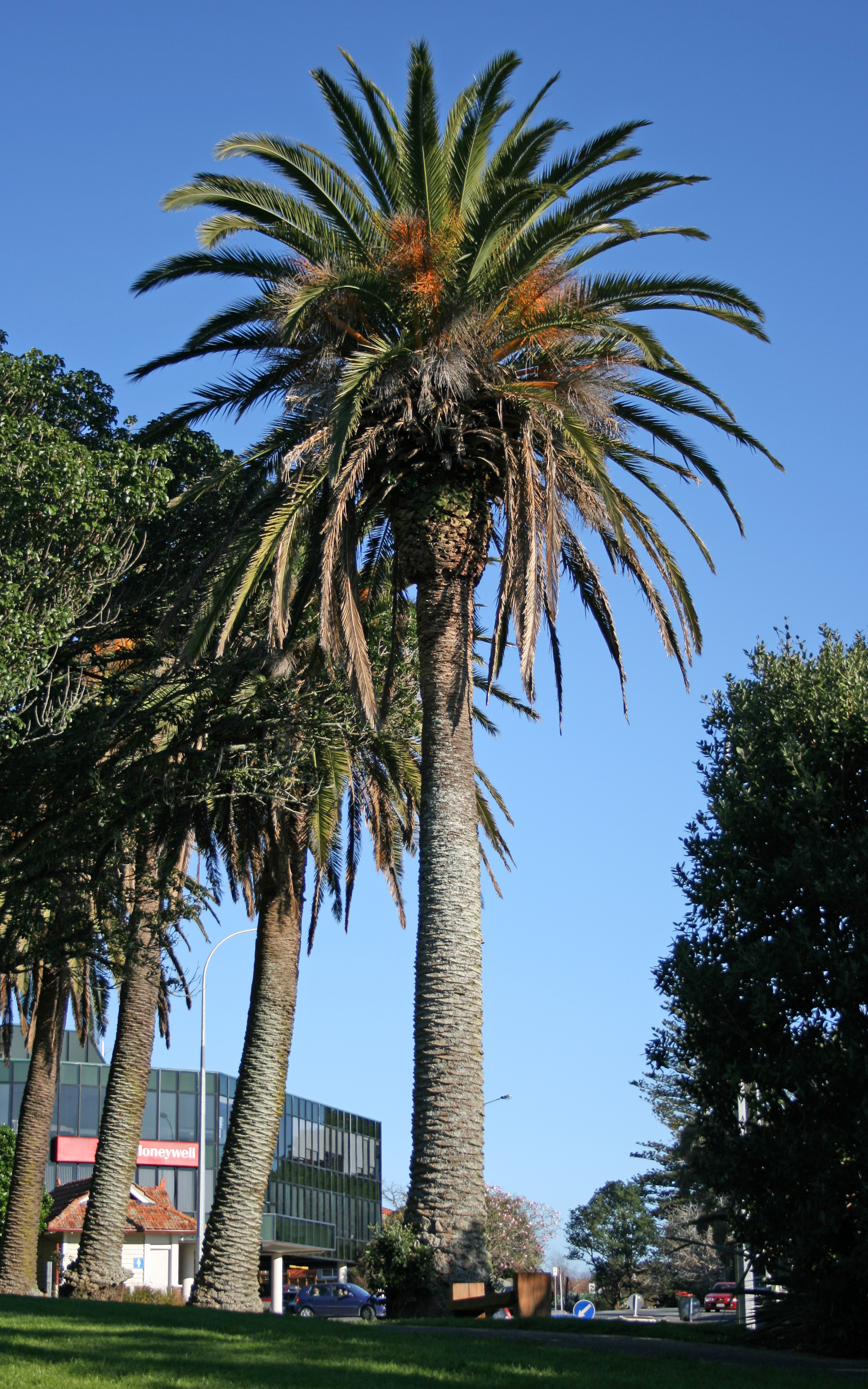
Phoenix canariensis

Based on the History of Miyazaki Sightseeing,

- Sightseeing, opening events and congresses have become important industries of Miyazaki.
- In 1926, Miyazaki City Bus Company(now Miyazaki Kotsu Co., Ltd.) was founded.
- In 1932, Tachibana Bridge was completed.
- In 1937, Cactus Park was made along the Nichinan Coast.
- In 1939, Children's Park was founded in Aoshima, Miyazaki.
- In 1954, 51 phoenix canariensis trees (tree of the Prefecture) were transplanted in the Tachibana Park.
- In 1959, professional baseball team Tokyo Giants started off-season training camp in Miyazaki. Several other teams followed later.
- In 1965, a popular television program Tamayura was broadcast, starting honeymoon boom here in Miyazaki.
- In 1971, Phoenix seaside hotel, zoo, golf course opened.
- In 1974, the first Dunlop Phoenix Tournament (golf) started.
- In 1974, the peak of Miyazaki honeymoon boom.
- In 1984, Teruha suspension bridge was completed at Aya.
- In 1994, Seagaia Ocean Dome opened in Miyazaki.
- In 2001, Seagaia Ocean Dome went into financial failure.
- In 2004, Seagaia Ocean Dome reopened.

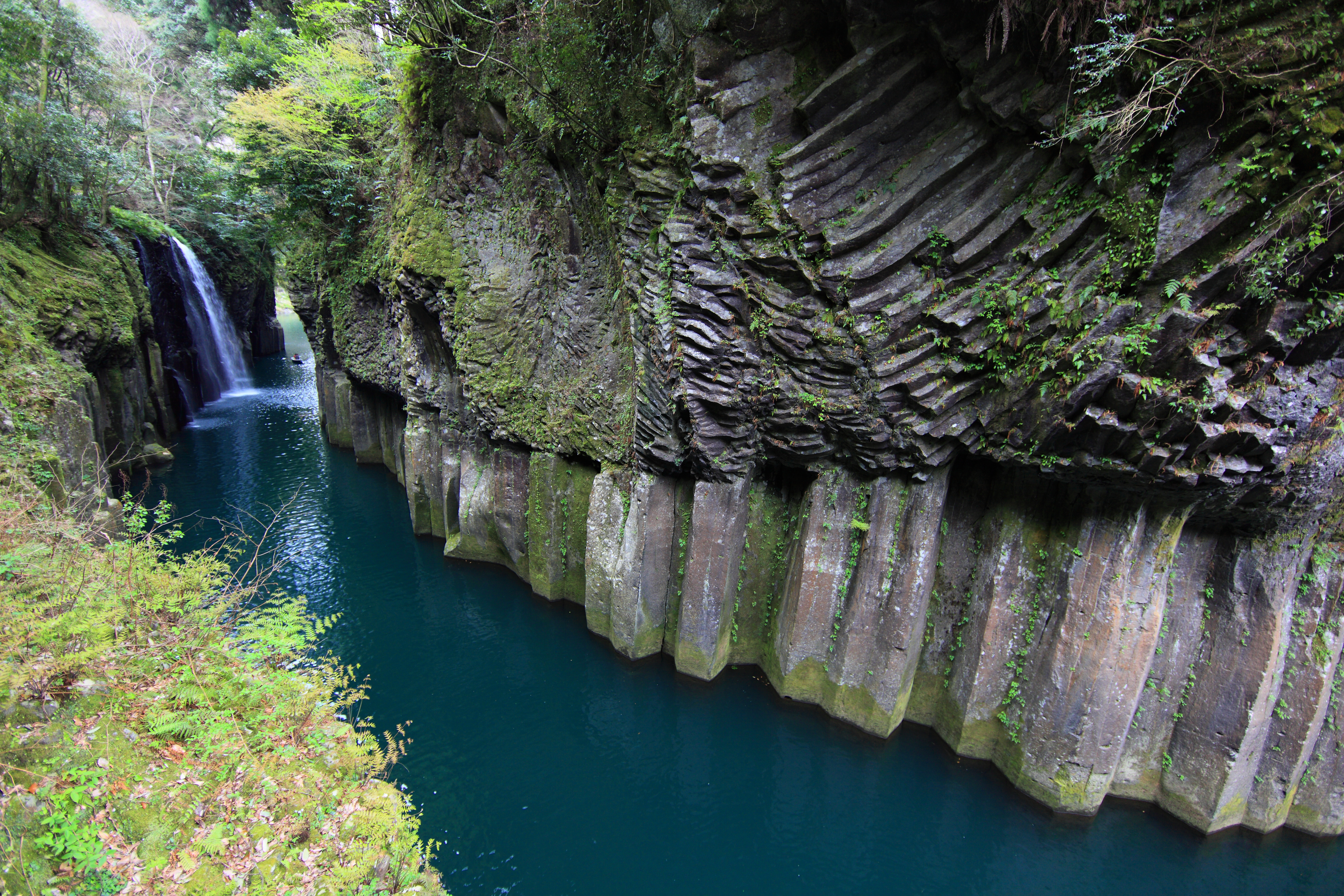
Takachiho-kyo(Gorge) and Manai waterfall

== Hideo Higashikokubaru, Governor of Miyazaki Prefecture (2007–2011) ==
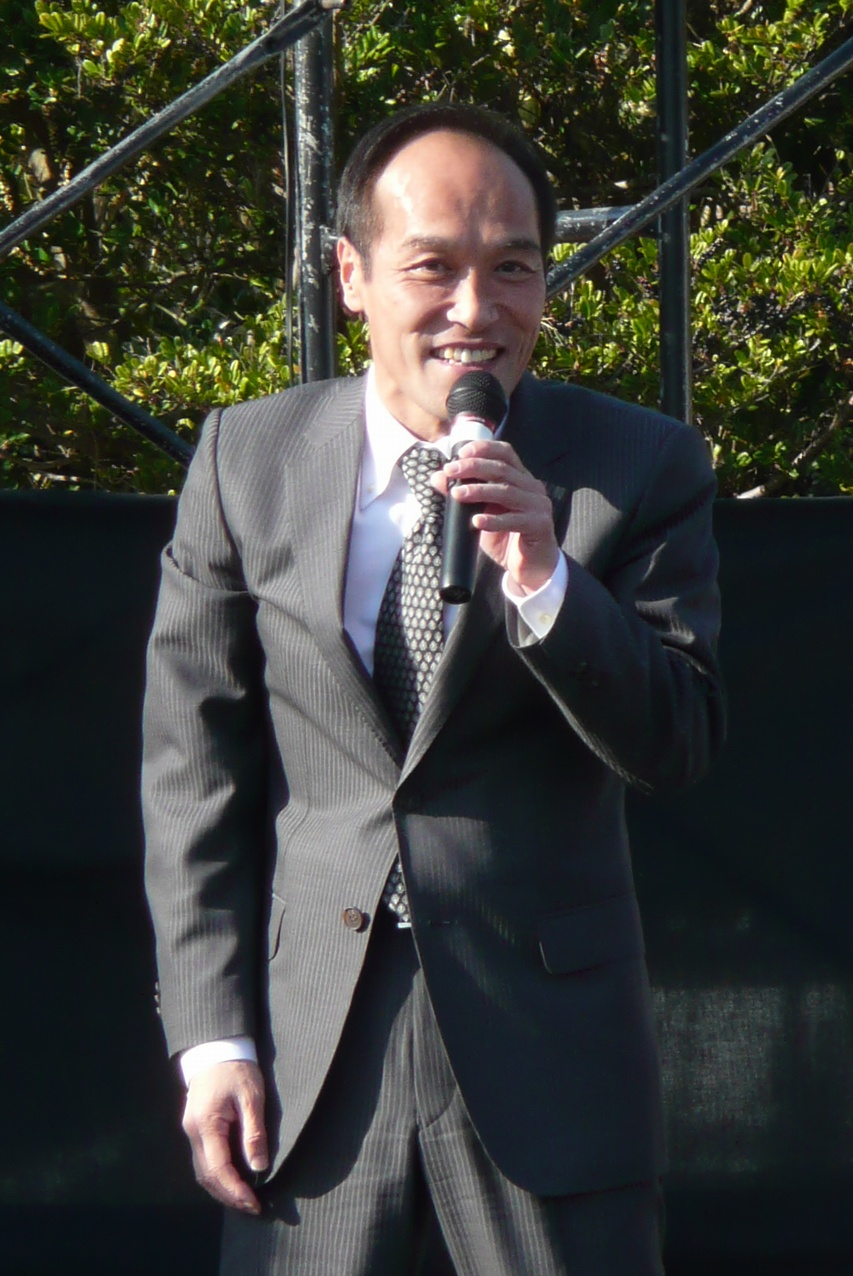
Hideo Higashikokubaru

- Nicknamed Sonomanma Higashi, a name he used as a comedian, he revealed his true name to be Hideo Higashikokubaru in his campaign to become the governor of Miyazaki Prefecture. An election which he won by a landslide. Hideo frequently appeared in television and often worked as a salesman of the Miyazaki Prefecture. At the start of his term, Hideo was very active in office due to an outbreak of avian influenza. In his later days in office, Hideo played a key role as the governor of Miyazaki during an outbreak of foot-and-mouth disease, prevalent in both cows and pigs across the prefecture. Hideo was very popular with the people of Miyazaki with support levels at around 90%. In 2011, he ran for the governor of Tokyo but finished second to Shintaro Ishihara.
