= Yatake Kōgen Prefectural Natural Park =

Prefectural Natural Park in western Miyazaki Prefecture, Japan

- 矢岳高原県立自然公園
- Location within Miyazaki Prefecture Location within Japan
- Location: Miyazaki Prefecture, Japan
- Coordinates: 32.08°N 130.77°E
- Area: 6.68 km^{2} (2.58 sq mi)
- Established: 24 December 1966

Yatake Kōgen Prefectural Natural Park (矢岳高原県立自然公園, Yatake Kōgen kenritsu shizen kōen) is a Prefectural Natural Park in western Miyazaki Prefecture, Japan. Established in 1966, the park is within the municipality of Ebino. The park derives its name from the Yatake plateau (矢岳高原), celebrated for its views of the Kirishima mountains and Sakurajima.

== See also ==
- National Parks of Japan
