= Wanitsuka Prefectural Natural Park =

Natural park in Miyazaki prefecture, Japan

- わにつか県立自然公園
- Location within Miyazaki Prefecture Location within Japan
- Location: Miyazaki Prefecture, Japan
- Coordinates: 31.77°N 131.27°E
- Area: 47.01 km^{2} (18.15 sq mi)
- Established: 31 March 1961

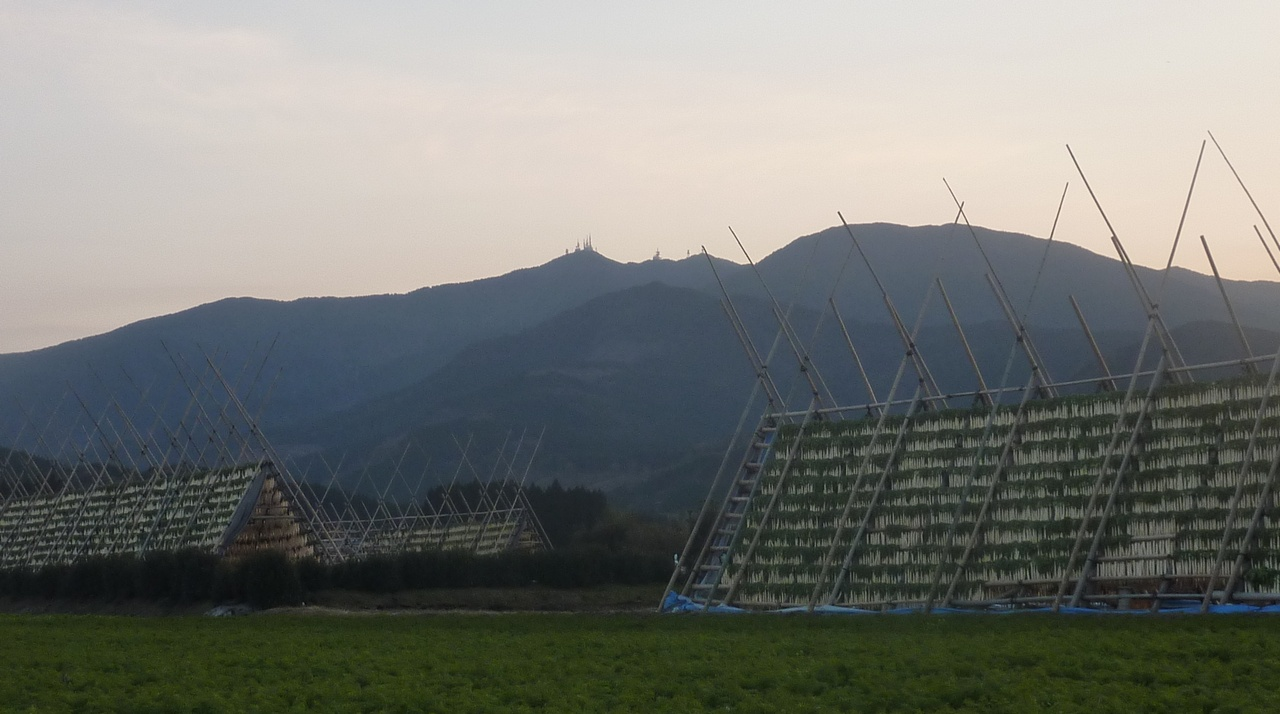

Wanitsuka Prefectural Natural Park (わにつか県立自然公園, Wanitsuka kenritsu shizen kōen) is a prefectural natural park in southern Miyazaki Prefecture, Japan. Established in 1961, the park spans the municipalities of Mimata, Miyakonojō, Miyazaki, and Nichinan. The park encompasses a number of valleys in the Wanitsuka, Boruishi (双石山), and Tokuso mountains and is celebrated for its views of the Kirishima mountains and Sakurajima.

== See also ==
- National Parks of Japan
