= Shinto texts =

Japanese sacred texts

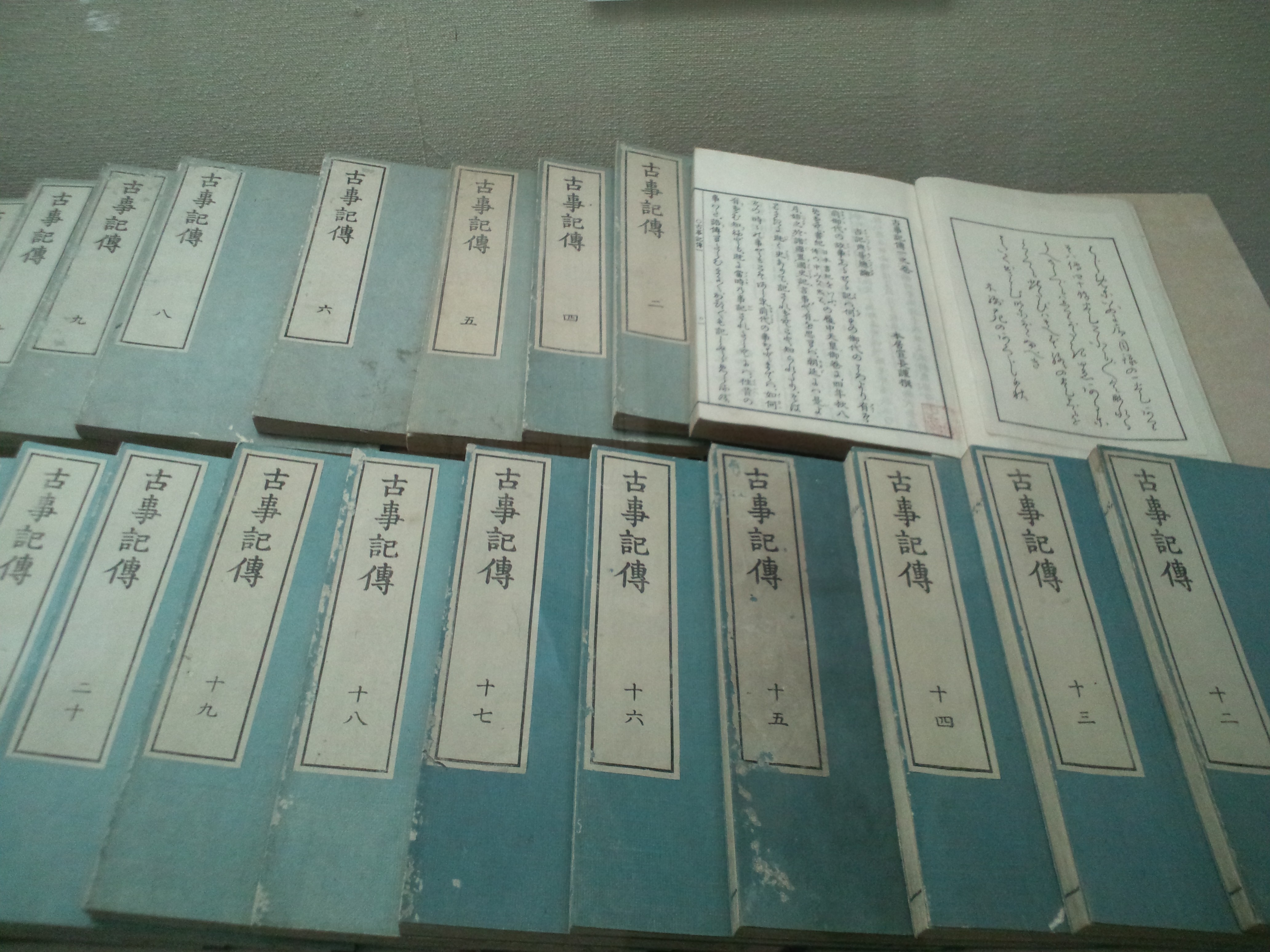
Copies of the Kojiki at a museum

Shinto texts (神典, Shinten) are the holy books of Shinto.

The main two books are the Kojiki and the Nihon Shoki, collectively called the Kiki (記紀).

== Content ==
- Tennōki record of the genealogy of the Imperial Family. Burned in a fire in 645 with no other copies existing. Only record is in the Nihon Shoki.
- Kojiki - One of the Kiki.
- Nihon Shoki – One of the Kiki, first of the Rikkokushi.
- Enryaku-gishiki-cho
- Kogo Shūi
- Kujiki – A book that used to be part of the Kiki, generally seen as a forgery based on the Nihon Shoki, the Kojiki and the Kogo Shūi. No longer seen as scripture.

These books are sometimes considered scripture

- Engishiki
- Fudoki
- Manyoshu
- Ritsuryo codes
- Rikkokushi
- Shinsen Shōjiroku
- Konjaku Monogatarishū
- Nihon Ryōiki

== History ==
The Kojiki was written first in 711. It is the oldest surviving Japanese book. It is believed that the compilation of various genealogical and anecdotal histories of the imperial (Yamato) court and prominent clans began during the reigns of Emperors Keitai and Kinmei in the 6th century, with the first concerted effort at historical compilation of which we have record being the one made in 620 under the auspices of Prince Shotoku and Soga no Umako. According to the Nihon Shoki, the documents compiled under their initiative were the Tennōki (天皇記, also Sumera-mikoto no fumi) or the "Record of the Emperors", the Kokki (国記, also Kunitsufumi) or the "National Record", and other "fundamental records" (本記, hongi or mototsufumi) pertaining to influential clans and free subjects. Out of these texts, only the Kokki survived the burning of Soga no Emishi's estate (where these documents were kept) during the Isshi incident of 645, and was itself apparently lost soon after.

The Kojiki's preface indicates that leading families also kept their own historical and genealogical records; indeed, one of the reasons it gives for the compilation of the Kojiki is the correction of errors that had supposedly crept into these documents. According to the preface, Emperor Tenmu (reigned 673–686) ordered the review and emendation of clan documents and commissioned a certain court attendant (toneri) of exceptional memory named Hieda no Are to memorize records and oral traditions concerning the imperial lineage. Beyond this memorization, nothing occurred until the reign of Empress Genmei (reigned 707–715), who on the 18th of the 9th month of 711 (Wadō 4) ordered the courtier Ō no Yasumaro to record what had been learned by Hieda no Are. He finished and presented his work to Empress Genmei on the 28th of the 1st month of 712 (Wadō 5).

The Kojiki is a collation of different traditions woven into a single "official" mythology, made in an attempt to justify the rule of the imperial Yamato polity and at the same time to subsume different interest groups under its wing by giving them a place and an interest in the national genealogy-mythology. Apart from furthering the imperial agenda, an increased interest in the nation's origins in reaction to the influx of foreign culture and the need for an authoritative genealogical account by which to consider the claims of noble families and to reorganize them into a new system of ranks and titles are also possible factors for its compilation.

The Kojiki's narrative establishes the Yamato line's right to rule via myth and legend, portraying it as the progeny of heavenly deities and the rightful heir to the land of Japan. A good part of the latter portion of the text is spent recounting various genealogies which served not only to give the imperial family an air of antiquity (which may not necessarily reflect historical reality), but also served to tie, whether true or not, many existing clans' genealogies to their own. Regardless of the work's original intent, it finalized and possibly even formulated the framework by which Japanese history was examined in terms of the reign of emperors.

The Kojiki and Nihongi are believed to have been derived from earlier written sources. Such sources were not clear, but a structure of the Kojiki can be deduced as such.

1. The first gods were Ame-no-Minakanushi, Takamimusubi, and Kamimusubi.
2. Izanagi and Izanami, god siblings, came from heaven. They had children. Izanami created the Japanese archipelago. She died birthing the fire god Kagutsuchi and was taken to Yomi the land of the dead. Izanagi couldn't retrieve her. Cleaning himself, he created Amaterasu, Tsukuyomi, and Susanoo-no-Mikoto.
3. After fighting Susanoo-no-Mikoto, Amaterasu hid in a cave. The world became dark. Gods performed a ceremony to bring her out. Susanoo-no-Mikoto and Okuninushi got powerful treasures. They used them to build lands.
4. Takami-musubi and Amaterasu wanted to rule Japan's central lands. They convinced or forced Okuninushi and the other Kunitsukami to surrender the land.
5. They sent Ninigi, their grandson, to Japan. This was the Tenson Korin or the descent from Heaven. Ninigi came with many other Amatsukami.
6. Ninigi's great-grandson, Emperor Jinmu, moved from Kyushu to Yamato in the mythical war Jimmu's Eastern Expedition. He defeated the desdendants of Kunitsukami with the help of Amatsukami.
7. The descendants of Jimmu ruled over Japan and expanded their rule. The narrative transitioned to recorded history.

The Kojiki frequently makes brief mentions of figures who are never mentioned again, It is interpreted as a compression of a much larger mythology dedicated to the overarching purpose of legitimizing Imperial rule.

This contrasts with the Nihon Shoki which differs in three core ways

1. Follows Chinese dynastic histories in its structure with consistent dates.
2. Has multiple versions of each myth with a main version first, followed by subsequent quoted versions.
3. Omits much of the story of Okuninushi.
  1. Less focus on the Kunitsukami in general.
4. Has a lower presence of Solar imagery, and does not mention Amaterasu as an ancestress of the imperial lineage.

The Nihon Shoki came second in 720 In with the Kojiki, the Nihon Shoki is the first of six histories commissioned by the imperial court, which was modeled on Chinese dynastic histories and was intended to be a national chronicle that could be shown with pride to foreign envoys, the Kojiki is inward looking, concerned mainly with the ruling family and prominent clans, and is apparently intended for internal consumption. Whereas the Nihon Shoki uses a variety of source documents (including Chinese texts), the Kojiki is apparently based on sources handed down within the court.

The historical relationship between the Kojiki and Nihon Shoki are unclear. But during the Nara period the Kojiki was generally not quoted.

Imperial edicts from 697 to 749 referenced the Emperor as a descendant of the sun but also Cthonic associations.

In the Nihon Shoki there is a myth related to the rule of Emperor Sujin, Yamato Okunitama and a possible decline of the role of Amaterasu.

The idea of there being a static "Canon" mythology may have originated in the early 700s as a product of an attempt to legitimize Imperial rule.

In 807 the Kogo Shui a record of the Inbe clan was written, showing mythology was still in flux at that time. It is believed to have been written to raise the status of the Inbe clan, a sacerdotal clan that ran Awa Shrine and Inbe Shrine.

Later on the Kujiki was written as a compilation of elements from the Kojiki, Nihongi and Kogo Shui, likely by an author from the Mononobe clan as it seems to prominently praise the clan. It may indicate a decline of Imperial influence as it challenged the established authority of the Kiki.

Scholarship on the Kujiki generally considers it to contain some elements, specifically that Book 5 preserves traditions of the Mononobe and Owari clans, and that Book 10 preserves the earlier historical record the Record of the Provincial governors (国造本紀, Kokuzō Hongi).

The Rikkokushi directly follow the Nihongi but are considered separate due to their historical nature

== Early modern period ==
It was only in 1790 when Kokugaku scholar Motoori Norinaga published Kojiki-den that the Kojiki became widely studied. Before then the primary source that was used was the Nihon Shoki.

Unlike the Nihon Shoki, Kuni-no-Tokotachi does not have a creator role in the Kojiki, and he was highly significant in the currently dominant Suika Shinto and Yoshida Shinto.

Early Kokugaku thinkers actually avoided the usage of the word Shinto as it was associated with Yoshida Shinto.

The Kujiki was recognized as a forgery in the Edo period and stopped being used then.

The Kiki (記紀) became more prominent in the Meiji period since it was used for State Shinto.

== See also ==
- Japanese mythology
- Kojiki
- Nihon Shoki
- Waka (poetry)
- Chinese creation myths
- Japanese creation myth
- Kiki no Michi a path named after the Kiki
- Kojiki
- Nihon Shoki
- Waka (poetry)

== Bibliography ==
- Bentley, John R. The Authenticity of Sendai Kuji Hongi: A New Examination of Texts, With a Translation And Commentary. (ISBN 90-04-15225-3)
- Brownlee, John S. (1997) Japanese historians and the national myths, 1600-1945: The Age of the Gods and Emperor Jimmu. Vancouver: University of British Columbia Press. (ISBN 0-7748-0644-3) Tokyo: University of Tokyo Press. (ISBN 4-13-027031-1)
- Brownlee, John S. (1991). Political Thought in Japanese Historical Writing: From Kojiki (712) to Tokushi Yoron (1712). Waterloo, Ontario: Wilfrid Laurier University Press. (ISBN 0-88920-997-9)
- Nihon Koten Bungaku Daijiten Henshū Iinkai (1986). Nihon Koten Bungaku Daijiten (in Japanese). Iwanami Shoten. ISBN 4-00-080067-1.
- Ono, Motonori Shinto: The Kami Way
- Starrs, Roy (2005). "The Kojiki as Japan's National Narrative", in Asian Futures, Asian Traditions, edited by Edwina Palmer. Folkestone, Kent: Global Oriental, ISBN 1-901903-16-8
- Wittkamp, Robert F. (2018). "The Body as a Mode of Conceptualization in the Kojiki Cosmogony" in「東西学術研究所紀要」第51輯 (Tōzai gakujutsu kenkyūsho kiyō 51, pp. 47–64, PDF online available).
- Wittkamp, Robert F. (2020): "Re-Examining Japanese Mythologies: Why the Nihon Shoki has two books of myths but the Kojiki only one" in「東西学術研究所紀要」第53輯 (Tōzai gakujutsu kenkyūsho kiyō 53, pp. 13–39, PDF online available).
- Yamaguchi, Yoshinori; Takamitsu Kōnoshi (1997). Nihon Koten Bungaku Zenshū: Kojiki. Tōkyō: Shogakukan. ISBN 4-09-658001-5.
