= Mochio-Sekinoo Prefectural Natural Park =

Natural park in Miyazaki prefecture, Japan

Coordinates: 31.762122°N 130.986107°E

- 母智丘関之尾県立自然公園
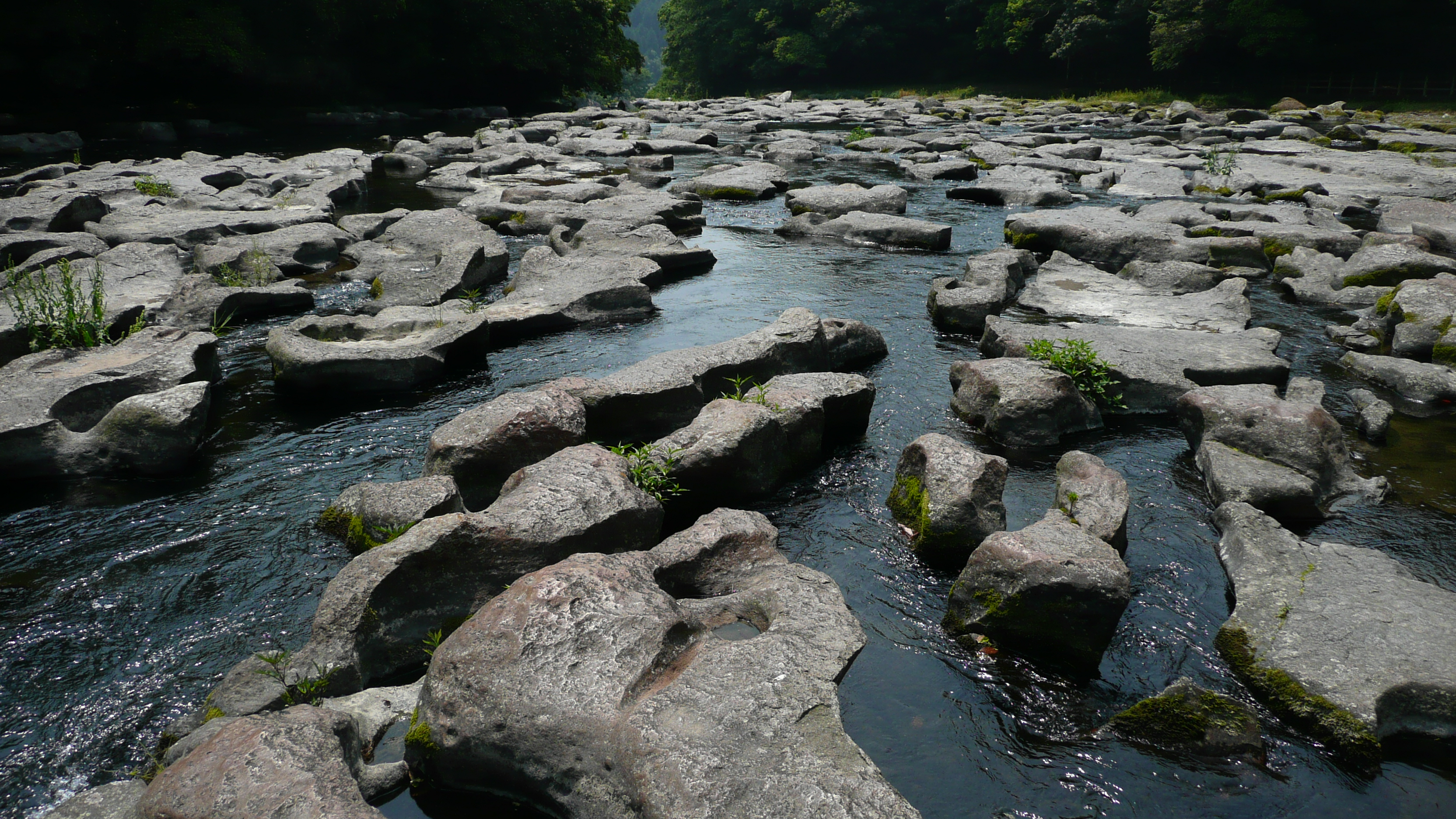
- Sekinoo potholes
- Interactive map of Mochio-Sekinoo Prefectural Natural Park
- Location: Miyazaki Prefecture, Japan
- Area: 6.34 km^{2} (2.45 sq mi)
- Established: 1 September 1958

Mochio-Sekinoo Prefectural Natural Park (母智丘関之尾県立自然公園, Mochio-Sekinoo kenritsu shizen kōen) is a Prefectural Natural Park in southern Miyazaki Prefecture, Japan. Established in 1958, the park is within the municipality of Miyakonojō. The area is celebrated for its cherry blossoms, waterfalls, and potholes - which have been designated a Natural Monument.

== See also ==
- National Parks of Japan
