= Miyazaki Prefecture =

Prefecture of Japan

Coordinates: 32°1′N 131°21′E

Miyazaki Prefecture 宮崎県
- Prefecture

Japanese transcription(s)
  - Japanese: 宮崎県
  - Rōmaji: Miyazaki-ken
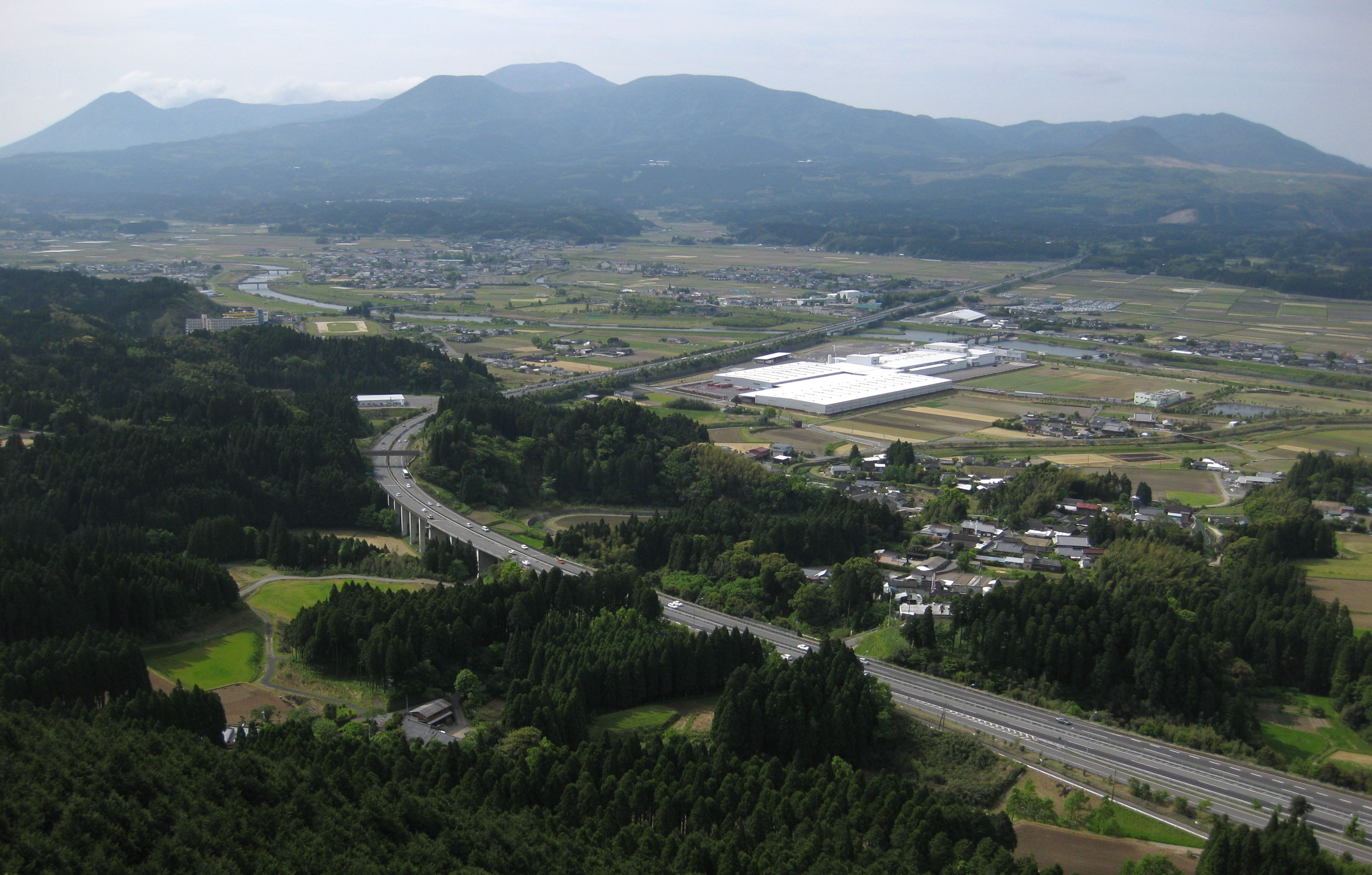
- Panoramic view of the Kakutō Basin in Ebino City, Miyazaki Prefecture. The Ebino Interchange between the Kyushu and Miyazaki Expressways can be seen

- Flag Symbol
- Anthem: Miyazaki kenminka
- Country: Japan
- Region: Kyushu
- Island: Kyushu
- Capital: Miyazaki
- Subdivisions: Districts: 6, Municipalities: 26

Government
  - Governor: Shunji Kōno

Area
  - Total: 7,735.32 km^{2} (2,986.62 sq mi)
  - Rank: 14th

Population (February 1, 2025)
  - Total: 1,026,874
  - Rank: 35th
  - Density: 133/km^{2} (340/sq mi)

GDP
  - Total: JP¥ 3,767 billion US$ 27.9 billion (2022)
- ISO 3166 code: JP-45
- Website: www.pref.miyazaki.lg.jp
- Symbols of Japan
- Bird: Ijima copper pheasant (Phasianus soemmerringii ijimae)
- Flower: Hamayu (Crinum asiaticum var. japonicum)
- Tree: Phoenix palm (Phoenix canariensis)

Miyazaki Prefecture (宮崎県, Miyazaki-ken; Japanese pronunciation: [mʲì.jä́.(d͡)zä̀.k̟ʲì, -(d͡)zä́.k̟ʲi̥.kè̞ɴ̀]) is a prefecture of Japan located on the island of Kyūshū. Miyazaki Prefecture has a population of 1,028,215 as of 1 January 2025 and has a geographic area of 7,735 km^{2} (2,986 sq mi). Miyazaki Prefecture borders Ōita Prefecture to the north, Kumamoto Prefecture to the northwest, and Kagoshima Prefecture to the southwest.

Miyazaki is the capital and largest city of Miyazaki Prefecture, with other major cities including Miyakonojō, Nobeoka, and Hyūga. Miyazaki Prefecture is located in southeastern Kyūshū on Japan's Pacific coast, with its coastline extending from Nobeoka near the entrance to the Bungo Channel to Shibushi Bay in Kushima.

== History ==
Historically, after the Meiji Restoration, Hyūga Province was renamed Miyazaki Prefecture.

In Japan, Miyazaki Prefecture was first created in 1873 when Mimitsu Prefecture was merged with parts of Miyakonojō Prefecture. The first Miyazaki existed only until 1876 when it was merged (back) into Kagoshima Prefecture. Under public pressure and demands in the Kagoshima Prefectural Assembly, Miyazaki became finally independent from Kagoshima in 1883.

== Geography ==
Miyazaki Prefecture is on the eastern coast of the island of Kyushu, surrounded by the Pacific Ocean to the south and east, Ōita Prefecture to the north, and Kumamoto and Kagoshima prefectures to the west. It is one of only two locations on Earth where the fungus Chorioactis geaster is found. Miyazaki is the home of the hyuganatsu fruit. It is also home to two virgin forests of the palm Livistona chinensis, one of which, on the islet of Aoshima, Miyazaki, is the northernmost reproducing population of its native range.

As of 31 March 2019, 12% of the total land area of the prefecture was designated as Natural Parks, namely the Kirishima-Kinkōwan National Park; Kyūshū Chūō Sanchi, Nichinan Kaigan, Nippō Kaigan, and Sobo-Katamuki Quasi-National Parks; and Mochio-Sekinoo, Osuzu, Saitobaru-Sugiyasukyō, Sobo Katamuki, Wanitsuka, and Yatake Kōgen Prefectural Natural Parks.

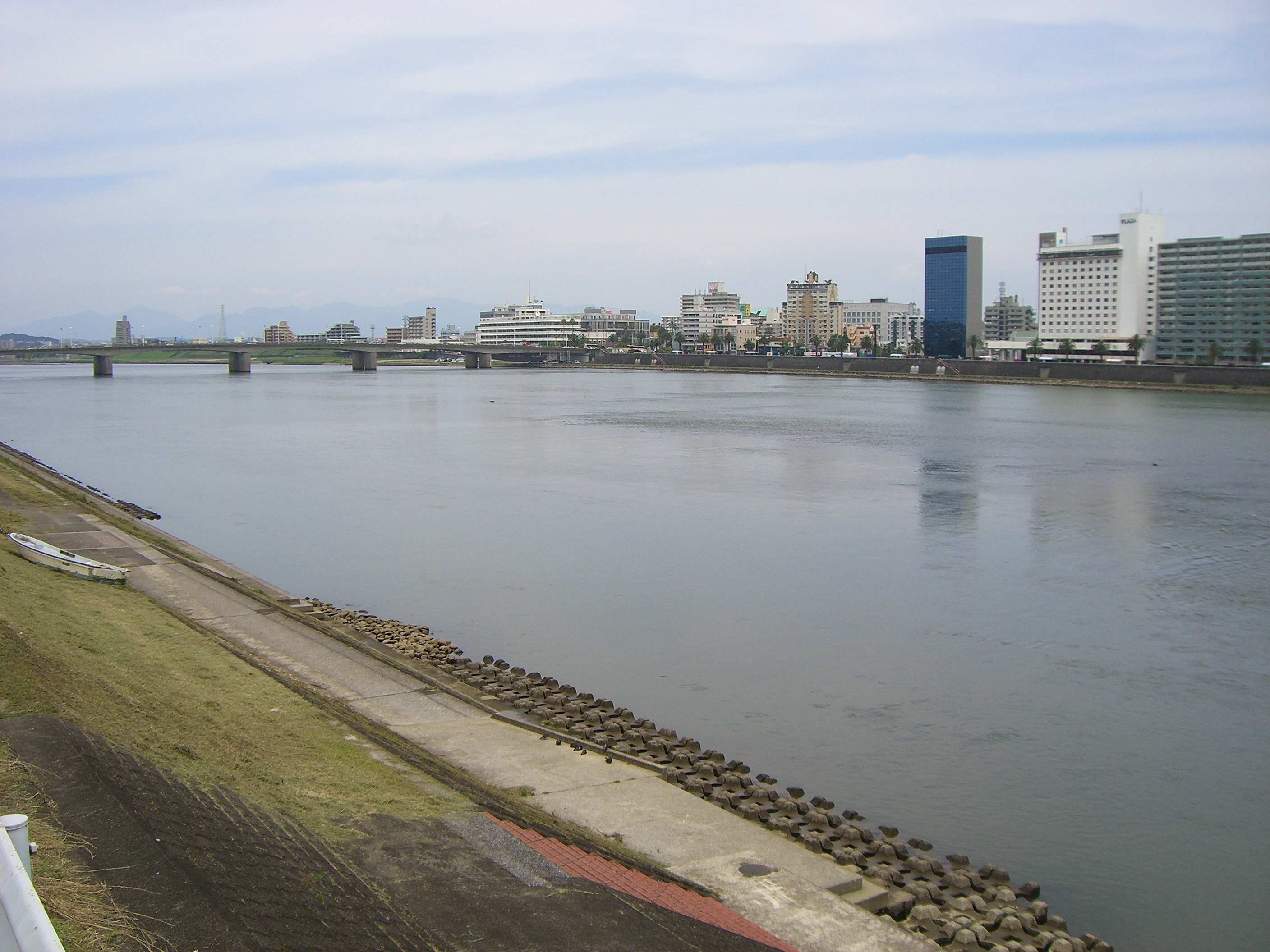
Ōyodo River in Miyazaki City

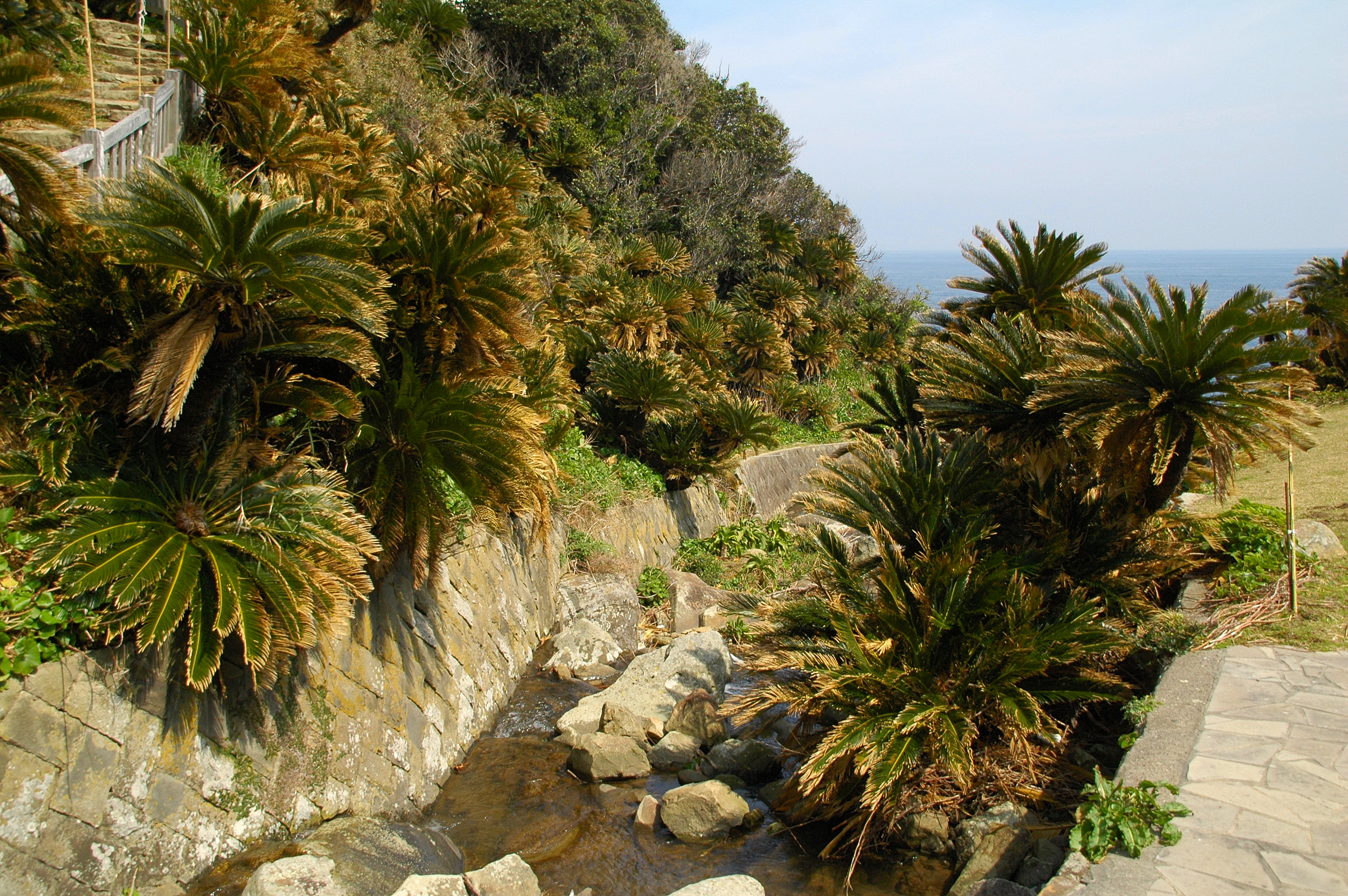
Cape Toi, habitat of Cycas revoluta (Sotetsu)

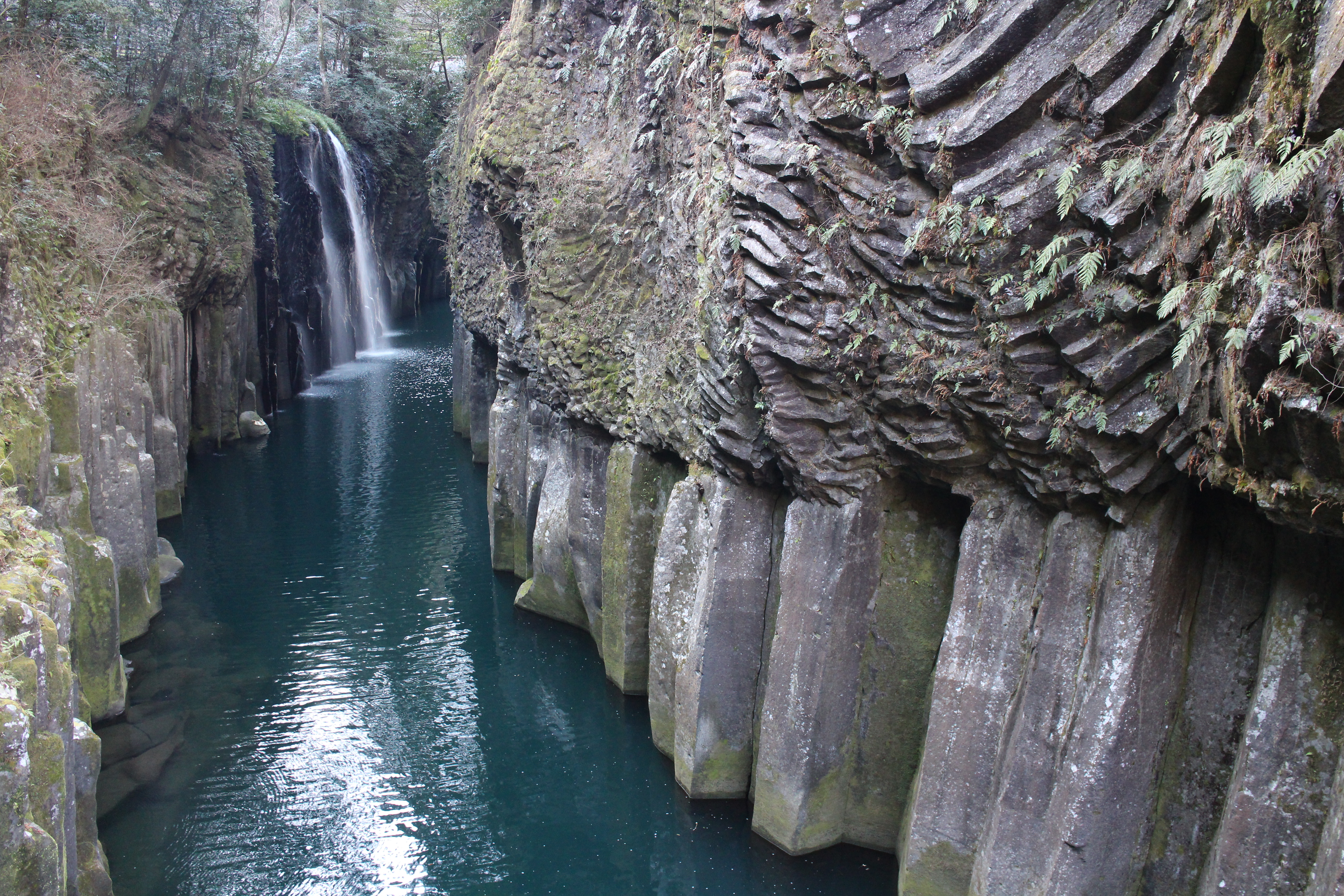
Takachiho Valley

=== Cities ===
Map of Miyazaki Prefecture City Town Village

Nine cities are in Miyazaki Prefecture:

| Name | | Area (km^{2}) | Population | Map |
| Rōmaji | Kanji | Area (km^{2}) | Population | Map |
|---|---|---|---|---|
| Ebino | えびの市 | 282.93 | 18,337 | |
| Hyūga | 日向市 | 336.94 | 60,037 | |
| Kobayashi | 小林市 | 562.95 | 44,154 | |
| Kushima | 串間市 | 295.16 | 17,457 | |
| Miyakonojō | 都城市 | 653.36 | 161,137 | |
| Miyazaki (capital) | 宮崎市 | 643.67 | 398,215 | |
| Nichinan | 日南市 | 536.11 | 51,241 | |
| Nobeoka | 延岡市 | 868.02 | 119,521 | |
| Saito | 西都市 | 438.79 | 29,262 | |

=== Districts ===
Miyazaki prefecture population pyramid in 2020

These are the towns and villages of each district:

| Name | | Area (km^{2}) | Population | District | Type | Map |
| Rōmaji | Kanji | Area (km^{2}) | Population | District | Type | Map |
|---|---|---|---|---|---|---|
| Aya | 綾町 | 95.19 | 7,023 | Higashimorokata District | Town | |
| Gokase | 五ヶ瀬町 | 171.73 | 3,537 | Nishiusuki District | Town | |
| Hinokage | 日之影町 | 277.67 | 3,656 | Nishiusuki District | Town | |
| Kadogawa | 門川町 | 120.52 | 17,526 | Higashiusuki District | Town | |
| Kawaminami | 川南町 | 90.12 | 15,372 | Koyu District | Town | |
| Kijō | 木城町 | 145.96 | 5,008 | Koyu District | Town | |
| Kunitomi | 国富町 | 130.63 | 18,717 | Higashimorokata District | Town | |
| Mimata | 三股町 | 110.02 | 25,379 | Kitamorokata District | Town | |
| Misato | 美郷町 | 448.84 | 4,823 | Higashiusuki District | Town | |
| Morotsuka | 諸塚村 | 187.56 | 1,532 | Higashiusuki District | Village | |
| Nishimera | 西米良村 | 271.51 | 1,013 | Koyu District | Village | |
| Shiiba | 椎葉村 | 537.29 | 2,579 | Higashiusuki District | Village | |
| Shintomi | 新富町 | 61.53 | 16,663 | Koyu District | Town | |
| Takachiho | 高千穂町 | 237.54 | 11,959 | Nishiusuki District | Town | |
| Takaharu | 高原町 | 85.39 | 8,709 | Nishimorokata District | Town | |
| Takanabe | 高鍋町 | 43.8 | 20,185 | Koyu District | Town | |
| Tsuno | 都農町 | 102.11 | 10,028 | Koyu District | Town | |

== Sports ==
The sports teams/events listed below are based in Miyazaki.

=== Association football ===
- Honda Lock S.C. (Miyazaki City)
- Tegevajaro Miyazaki (Miyazaki City)

=== Basketball (bj League) ===
- Miyazaki Shining Suns (Miyazaki City)

=== Golf (Japan Golf Tour) ===
- Dunlop Phoenix Tournament (ダンロップフェニックストーナメント, Danroppu fenikkusu tōnamento) (Miyazaki City)
  - Annual Japan Golf Tour event, with one of the highest prize money amounts on the tour, that attracts top players from around the world.

== Transportation ==
=== Rail ===
- JR Kyushu
  - Nippō Main Line, Miyazaki Kūkō Line, Nichinan Line, Kitto Line, Hisatsu Line

=== Bus ===
- Miyazaki Kōtsu

=== Airport ===
- Miyazaki Airport

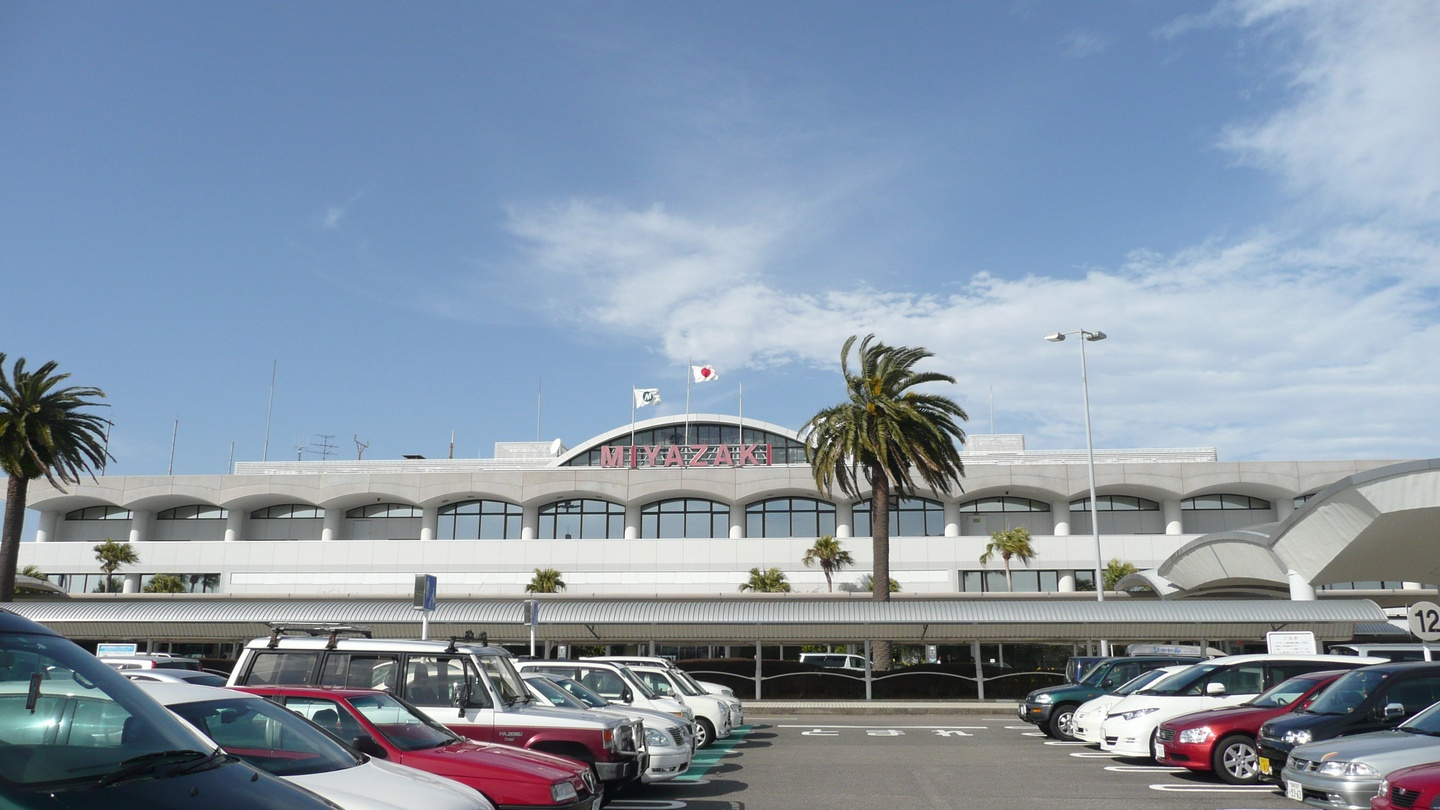
Miyazaki Airport

== Notable people ==
- Masatoshi Nei (1931–2023), evolutionary biologist, born in Miyazaki Prefecture
- Mei Terada (2005 - ) member of K-pop group Say My Name

== See also ==
- History of Miyazaki Prefecture
- Miyazaki Ocean Dome
