= List of mergers in Miyazaki Prefecture =

Here is a list of mergers in Miyazaki Prefecture, Japan since the Heisei era.

== Mergers from April 1, 1999 to Present ==
- On January 1, 2006 - the towns of Sadowara and Tano (both from Miyazaki District), and the town of Takaoka (from Higashimorokata District) were merged into the expanded city of Miyazaki.
- On January 1, 2006 - the old city of Miyakonojō absorbed the towns of Takajō, Takazaki, Yamada and Yamanokuchi (al from Kitamorokata District) to create the new and expanded city of Miyakonojō.
- On January 1, 2006 - the villages of Kitagō, Nangō and Saigō (all from Higashiusuki District) were merged to create the town of Misato.
- On February 20, 2006 - the towns of Kitakata and Kitaura (both from Higashiusuki District) were merged into the expanded city of Nobeoka.
- On February 25, 2006 - the town of Tōgō (from Higashiusuki District) was merged into the expanded city of Hyūga.
- On March 20, 2006 - the village of Suki (from Nishimorokata District) was merged into the newer and more expanded city of Kobayashi.
- On March 31, 2007 - the town of Kitagawa (from Higashiusuki District) was merged into the expanded city of Nobeoka.
- On March 30, 2009 - the old city of Nichinan absorbed the towns of Kitagō and Nangō (both from Minaminaka District) to create the new and expanded city of Nichinan. Minaminaka District was dissolved as a result of the merger.
- On March 23, 2010 - the town of Kiyotake (from Miyazaki District) was merged into the expanded city of Miyazaki. Miyazaki District was dissolved as a result of the merger.
- On March 23, 2010 - the town of Nojiri (from Nishimorokata District) was merged into the expanded city of Kobayashi.
