= Nangō, Miyazaki =

Nangō may refer to the following places in Miyazaki Prefecture, Japan:

- Nangō, Miyazaki (Higashiusuki), a former village in Higashiusuki District
- Nangō, Miyazaki (Minaminaka), a town in Minaminaka District
