= Kitagō, Miyazaki =

Kitagō, Miyazaki may refer to the following places in Miyazaki Prefecture, Japan:

- Kitagō, Miyazaki (Minaminaka), a former town located in Minaminaka District
- Kitagō, Miyazaki (Higashiusuki), a former village located in Higashiusuki District
