= Sadowara, Miyazaki =

Dissolved municipality in Miyazaki prefecture, Japan

Coordinates: 32°02′N 131°26′E

Sadowara (佐土原町, Sadowara-chō) was a town located in Miyazaki District, Miyazaki Prefecture, Japan.

== Population ==
As of 2003, the town had an estimated population of 32,882 and a density of 578.50 persons per km^{2}. The total area was 56.84 km^{2}.

== History ==
On January 1, 2006, Sadowara, along with the town of Tano (also from Miyazaki District), and the town of Takaoka (from Higashimorokata District), was merged into the expanded city of Miyazaki and no longer exists as an independent municipality.

== Local culture ==
Residents of Sadowara were known for flying Kujiranobori—streamers shaped like whales, similar to the traditional koinobori carp streamers.
