= Miyazaki District, Miyazaki =

Former district in Miyazaki prefecture, Japan

Coordinates: 31°54′28″N 131°25′13″E

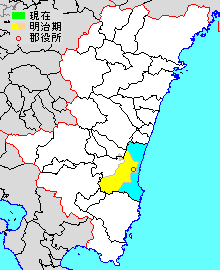

Miyazaki (宮崎郡, Miyazaki-gun) was a district located in Miyazaki Prefecture, Japan.

As of 2003 population statistics (but following the January 1, 2006 merger of the towns of Sadowara and Tano), the district had an estimated population of 28,937 and the density of 605.25 persons per km^{2}. The total area was 47.81 km^{2}.

== Former towns and villages ==
- Kiyotake
- Sadowara
- Tano

== Mergers ==
- On January 1, 2006 - the towns of Sadowara and Tano, along with the town of Takaoka (from Higashimorokata District), were merged into the expanded city of Miyazaki.
- On March 23, 2010 - the town of Kiyotake was merged into the expanded city of Miyazaki. Miyazaki District was dissolved as a result of this merger.
