= Hi no kuruma =

Mythical transport to hell in Japanese Buddhism

[[File:Ichiemon Hi-no-kuruma.jpg|right|thumb|240px|"kasha no sakura [Cherry Tree of the Fire Cart]".{{right|{{small|Nishimura Ichirōemon Shin otogi bōko (1683)]] hi no kuruma (火の車 or kasha (火車, lit. "fire cart"), in Japanese Buddhist common belief, is a fiery cart said to convey sinful humans at their death to hell.

== Nomenclature ==
The term according to Buddhist scripture is kasha but colloquially called hi no kuruma. It often appears in the Classical Chinese form kasha in medieval and early modern texts (cf. § In classic).

Kasha is rendered as "fire cart" or "car of fire" (Note: Joly gives kwasha or hi kuruma as "wheels of fire".)

The term originally denoted an instrument of torture, as in the set phrase kasha jigogu (火車地獄) referring to the particular area of hell where it is used, but later came to refer to the vehicle that carrying the hell-bound. Even later kasha became transferred to the name of the ogre-type lightning deity or cat-type yōkai held responsible for swooping down and snatching bodies from coffins (cf. kasha (folklore)) In modern times, the term kasha usually refers to the cat monster.

== Description ==
When a person who has compiled evil deeds is on the brink of death, the Gozu and Mezu ("Ox-Head and Horse-Head", baliffs of hell) or gokusotsu (wardens of hell) drawing the fire cart arrives to pick up the person for their journey to hell.

The fire cart features in the Heian Period anthology Konjaku monogatarishū, and later in early to mid-Edo Period literature such as Kii zōdanshū, the Shin chomonjū, Tankai (譚海). (Note: A passage in this work discusses the kasha that came to the second chief priest of Zōjō-ji, but Shin chomonshū below discusses what happened to the third priest at this temple, named Onyo.) In these fire four examples, the fire cart is normally written in the Classical Chinese style as kasha, (Note: That is to say, written as 火車 rather than 火の車. The former can be read as either "kasha", Chinese style, or "hi no kuruma", Japanese style.) and the same applies to other works such as the Shin otogi bōko below (cf. § In classics).

== In classics ==
=== Konjaku monogatarishū and Uji shūi monogatari ===
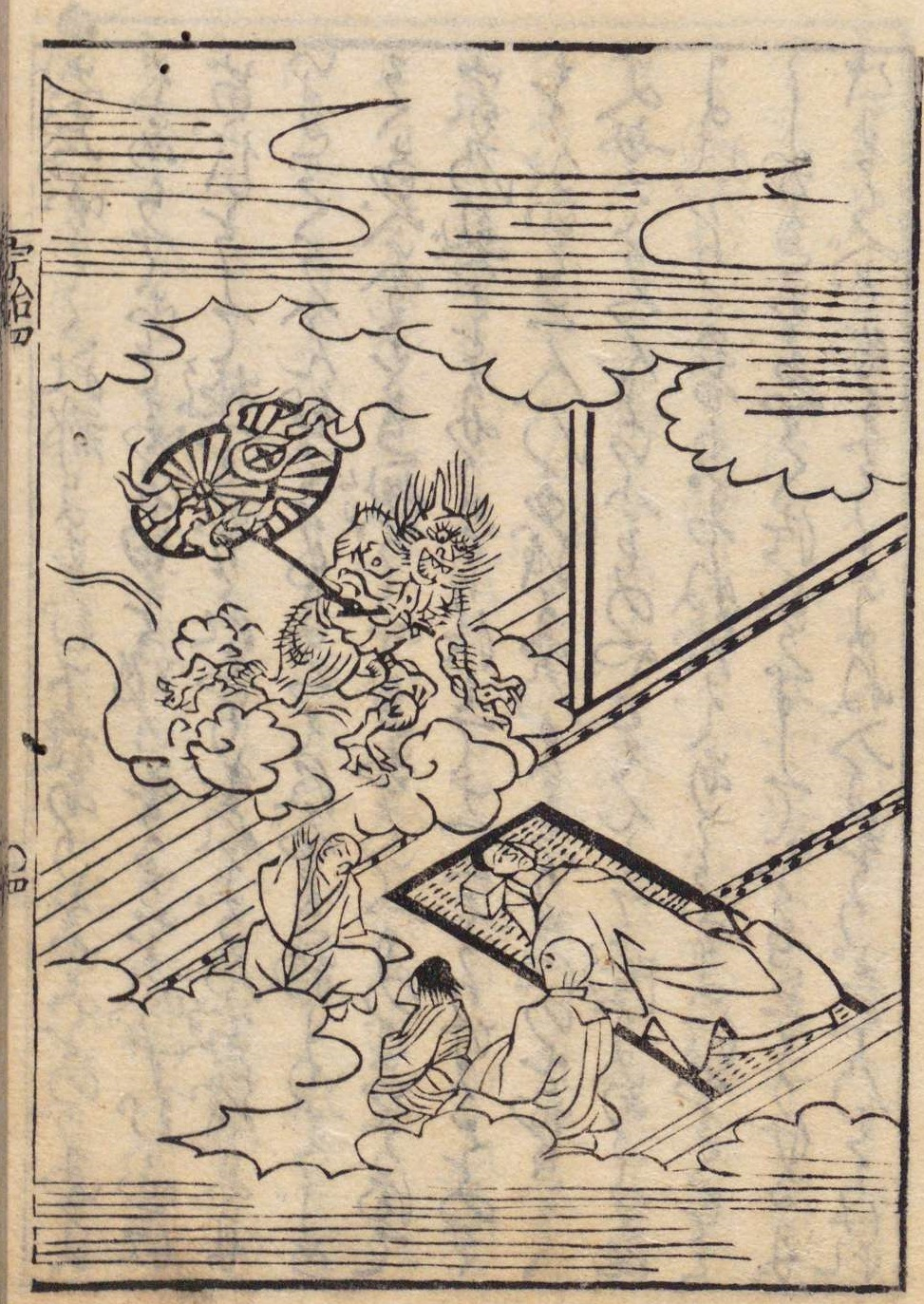
An oni ogre drawing a fire cart appears at the deathbed of the bettō high priest of Yakushi-ji. ―『宇治拾遺物語』

The Konjaku monogatarishū (after 1120s), Book 15, "Saigen, a sōzu-rank priest at Yakushi-ji's words at his death, part 4" (Note: Japanese: 「薬師寺済源僧都、往生語第四」.) describes how a kasha appeared at the deathbed of the sōzu-rank high priest Saigen (済源; 882-964), despite his near-impeccable character.

The same tale in essentially the same wording appears in the Uji shūi monogatari (c. 1212–1221), in Book 4, Tale 3 "Matter of the Yakushi-ji's bettō" (Note: Japanese: 「薬師寺別当の事」.) but the priest is unnamed, and given as a sōzu-ranked priest serving as a managing bettō. He was most upright and never embezzled any of the temple's property. (Note: The story ends in commenting that others in the same position elsewhere were prone to steal from the temple to fulfill their desire, and the narrator wonders what their fate would be, if even the Yakushi-ji priests small flaw brings the fire cart.) and was alarmed that his pick-up party from heavenly nirvana had not arrived, and the fire cart from hell came instead. The priest inquired the ogre pulling the cart as to why, and the oni ogre explained the priest had borrowed 5 to of rice not yet repaid. So the high priest ordered his subordinates to chant 1 sho of rice worth of prayer (double the amount owed), and they did so though perplexed as to why, and the fire cart dismissed itself. The priest then told his subordinates that the party from paradise has now arrived instead to escort him, and he rubbed the palms of his hands together in delight before expiring.

=== Shin otogi bōko ===
In Nishimura Ichiroemon (西村市郎右衛門)'s anthology Shin otogi bōko (新御伽婢子; pub. Tenna 3/1683), Book 1, Tale 16, "Cherry Tree of the Fire Cart" (cf. top image) (Note: Japanese: 「火車の桜」.) tells of an elderly couple who lived in the plains near Osaka. Their two married daughters visited a few days to nurse their sick mother day and night back to a measure of recovery. But that night, the daughters back at their home both dreamed that the mother was carried away on a fire cart pulled by the ox- and horse-headed wardens of hell. The women tried hard to restrain the cart by tying it to the cherry tree, but the rope and tree both burned off, and the cart got away. When the daughters returned to their parents, they were informed the mother just died, a horrible evil face frozen on her, and their back yard cherry tree had withered, with a clear rope mark on its trunk.

=== Kii zōdanshū and Kanwa kii ===
==== Higane jizō pavilion ====
In the Kii zōdanshū (published 1687, with earlier dated manuscripts), Book 4, Tale 3 "Matter of seeing the fire cart at the jizō [pavilion] in Higane, Mt. Hakone" (Note: Japanese: 「筥根山火金の地蔵にて火車を見る事」.) is an anecdote set in year Tenbun 6/1537, where a jige (unranked) official named Saemon went on a pilgrimage to the Higane jizō-dō (dō is often translated as "pavilion"), in Izu Province, and thought he saw the wife of a high-ranking neighbor, a yakata or "lord of the mansion" named Asahina Magohachirō (Note: Japanese: 朝日名孫八郎.) She looked gaunt and pallid, and slid right past without acknowledging him, which Saemon thought rather odd. Then dark clouds rose and a kijin came and carried the woman off in the fire cart.

The same narrative is also given in the Kanwa kii (漢和希夷; first written down in the early modern period), Tale 2.

=== Shin chomonjū ===
In the Shin chomonjū (新著聞集; pub. 1749), the following two anecdotes describe kasha as the fire vehicle, though the same work also contain kasha denoting a monster (cf. kasha (folklore) § Shin Chomonjū).

==== High Priest Onyo rides ====
The Shin chomonjū (新著聞集; pub. 1749), Part five on Exalted Deeds has an entry titled "High Priest Onyo himself rides a kasha/hi no kuruma, (Note: Japanese: 「音誉上人自ら火車に乗る」.) which purports that on the 2nd day of the Seventh month of Bunmei 11 (July 29, 1479), Onyo Shōnin (音誉上人) of Zōjō-ji was greeted by a kasha or hi no kuruma (i.e., the vehicle) which had come to carry him away. But this was not an envoy of hell, but rather an envoy of the pure land. The work asserts that the appearance of the kasha depended on whether or not one believed in the afterlife.

==== Inflammation and rot of lower body ====
The same work, Part ten on Strange Events has a entry titled "Sighting the Kasha, lower body gets inflamed and is destroyed", (Note: Japanese: 「火車の来るを見て腰脚爛れ壊る」.) which is set in Myōganji-mura (妙願寺村) village near Kisai in Musashi Province (now Kisai, Saitama). One time, a man named Yasubei who ran an alcohol shop suddenly ran off down a path, shouted "a kasha (hi no kuruma) is coming," and collapsed. By the time the family rushed to him, he had already lost his sanity and could not properly utter speech. He became bedridden, and ten days later, his lower body started rotting and he died.

=== Seiban kaidan jikki ===
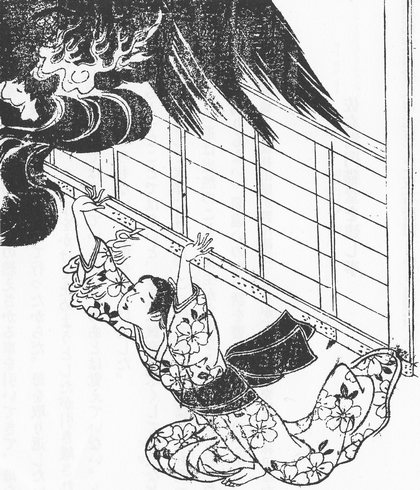
Seiban kaidan jikki (1682) Fire cart singing a woman's hand and clothing

In the ghost story collection 西播怪談実記 (Seiban kaidan jikki; Hōreki 4/1754), Book 3, the tale "Tatsuno Hayashida-ya's servant woman chases the fire cart getting her hand and clothing singed" (Note: Japanese: 「龍野林田屋の下女火の車を追ふて手并着物を炙し事」.) recollects that during the Kyōhō era in Tatsuno, Ibo District, Hyōgo (now Tatsunochō in Tatsuno, Hyōgo), there was a merchant proprietorship called Hashida-ya whose regular guest, an old woman, caught cold during her stay. The old woman grew feverish and delusional, despite her daughter's ministering efforts. One evening, the daughter ran out declaring her mother had been taken away for a ride. The merchant family thought the daughter became crazed out of sorrow, but when the daughter recovered from fainting, they noticed she complained of feeling hot, and her sleeves were burnt underneath. The old woman was found dead. The daughter testified to seeing an ogre-like being pulling a burning fire cart, throwing her mother in the car and taken her away, as she had seen in pictures. (cf. image right).

== Figurative use ==
The phrase "hi no kuruma" for being in financial traits derives from the Buddhist notion of the "fire car" that takes sinners to hell.
