= Kunitomi, Miyazaki =

Kunitomi 国富町
- Town
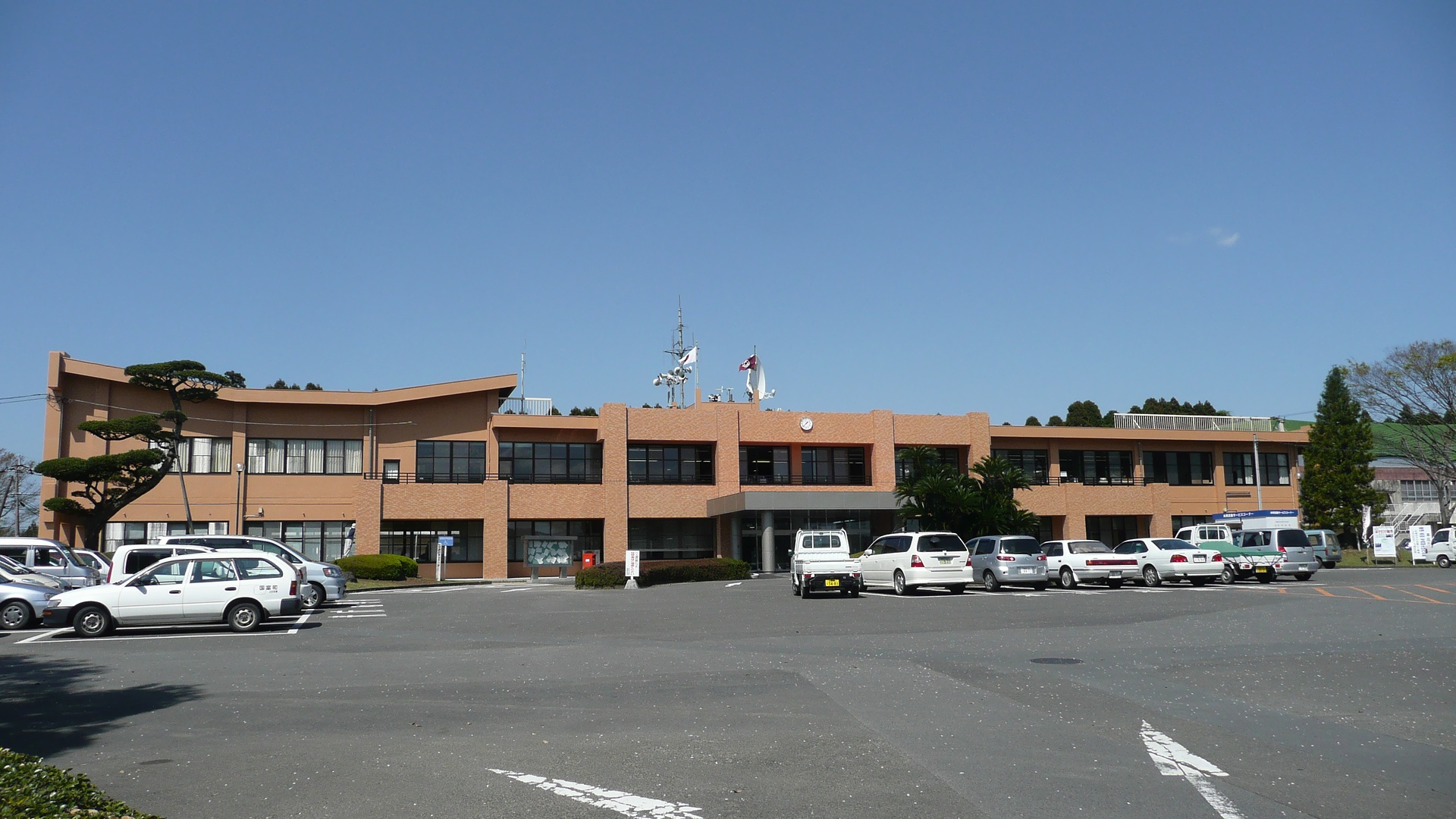
- Kunitomi Town Office

- Flag Emblem
- Interactive map of Kunitomi
- Location in Japan
- Coordinates: 31°59′26″N 131°19′25″E
- Country: Japan
- Region: Kyushu
- Prefecture: Miyazaki
- District: Higashimorokata

Area
  - Total: 130.63 km^{2} (50.44 sq mi)

Population (October 1, 2023)
  - Total: 17,757
  - Density: 135.93/km^{2} (352.07/sq mi)
- Time zone: UTC+09:00 (JST)
- City hall address: 4800 Honjō, Kunitomi-chō, Miyazaki-ken 880-1192
- Website: Official website
- Symbols
- Flower: Cosmos
- Tree: Evergreen oak

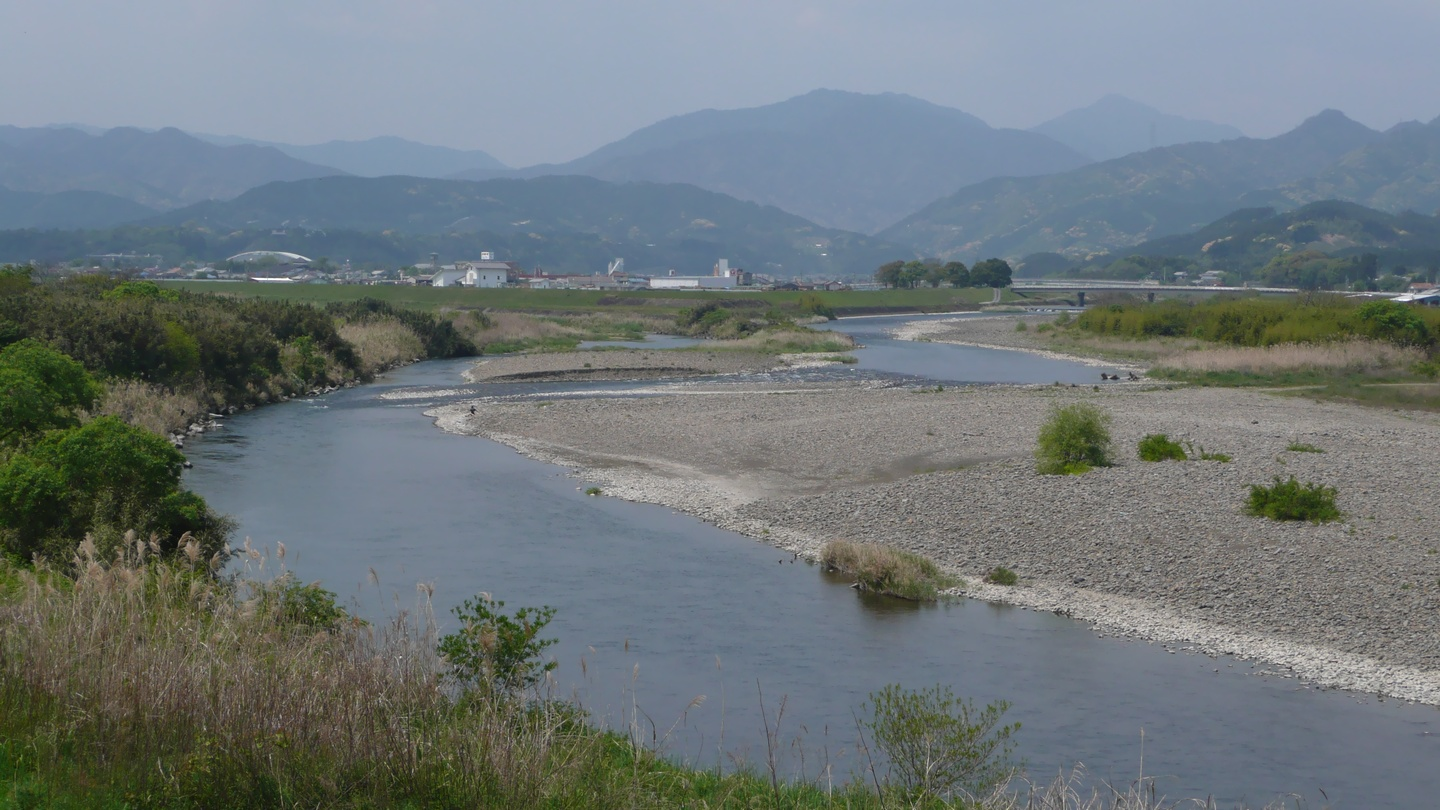
Honjō River in Kunitomi

Kunitomi (国富町, Kunitomi-chō) is a town located in Higashimorokata District, Miyazaki Prefecture, Japan. As of 1 October 2023, the town had an estimated population of 17,757 in 7481 households, and a population density of 140 persons per km^{2}. The total area of the town is 130.63 square kilometres (50.44 sq mi).

== Geography ==
It is an inland area located in the central part of Miyazaki Prefecture, northwest of Miyazaki City, and is a long and narrow town area extending from northwest to southeast, with the center on the south side. The area from the center to the eastern edge occupies a part of the Miyazaki Plain, and there are many plateaus. On the other hand, the northwestern part occupies a part of the Kyushu Mountains, and the northwestern tip is the summit of Mt. Kamondake (1223 meters). The Honjō River (a tributary of the Ōyodo River), the clearest stream in Kyushu, flows from east to west through the southern part of the town.

=== Neighbouring municipalities ===
Miyazaki Prefecture

- Aya
- Miyazaki
- Nichinan
- Nishimera
- Saito

=== Climate ===
Kunitomi has a humid subtropical climate (Köppen Cfa) characterized by warm summers and cool winters with light to no snowfall. The average annual temperature in Kunitomi is 16.3 °C. The average annual rainfall is 2309 mm with September as the wettest month. The temperatures are highest on average in August, at around 26.0 °C, and lowest in January, at around 6.2 °C.

=== Demographics ===
Per Japanese census data, the population of Kunitomi is as shown below

Historical population
Year	Pop.	±%
1950	18,024	—
1960	24,608	+36.5%
1970	23,368	−5.0%
1980	19,037	−18.5%
1990	19,864	+4.3%
2000	21,339	+7.4%
2010	22,367	+4.8%
2020	20,901	−6.6%

== History ==
The area of Kunitomi was part of ancient Hyūga Province, and contains many burial mounds from the Kofun period. During the Sengoku period, Toyotomi Hidenaga made a temple in the hamlet of Honjō his field headquarters during the Kyūshū campaign of 1586–1587. In the Edo period, most of the area was tenryō territory administered directly by Tokugawa shogunate, with small enclaves belonging to Nobeoka Domain and Takanabe Domain. The area was noted for its production of washi paper. The village of Honjō within Higashimorokata District, Miyazaki was established on May 1, 1889, with the creation of the modern municipalities system. It was raised to town status on March 1, 1919. Honjō merged with the village of Yashiro on September 30, 1956, to form the town of Kunitomi.

== Government ==
Kunitomi has a mayor-council form of government with a directly elected mayor and a unicameral town council of 13 members. Kunitomi, collectively with the town of Aya, constributes one member to the Miyazaki Prefectural Assembly. In terms of national politics, the town is part of the Miyazaki 1st district of the lower house of the Diet of Japan.

== Economy ==
Agriculture is the main focus of the local economy, and tobacco leaf and dried daikon radish production are ranked No. 1 in Japan. Industry includes solar cell production.

== Education ==
Kunitomi has four public elementary schools and three public junior high schools operated by the town government, and one public high school operated by the Miyazaki Prefecture Board of Education.

== Transportation ==
=== Railways ===
Kunitomi does not have any passenger railway service. The nearest train station is Miyazaki Station on the JR Kyushu Nippō Main Line.

=== Highways ===
- Miyazaki Expressway

== Local attractions ==
- Honjō Kofun Cluster, National Historic Site
