= Minaminaka District, Miyazaki =

District in Miyazaki Prefecture, Japan

(Japan > Miyazaki Prefecture > Minaminaka District)

Minaminaka (南那珂郡, Minaminaka-gun) was a district located in Miyazaki Prefecture, Japan.

Until the day before the dissolution, the district contained two towns.

- Kitagō (北郷町; Kitagō-chō)
- Nangō (南郷町; Nangō-chō)

== Timeline ==
- 1884 - Minaminaka District was created when Naka District, Miyazaki was divided into Minaminaka and Kitanaka Districts.
- May 1, 1889 - Due to the municipal status enforcement, the town of Aburatsu (油津町) and 15 villages were formed within Minaminaka District.(1 town, 15 villages)
- January 1, 1900 - The village of Obi (飫肥村) was elevated to town status to become the town of Obi (飫肥町). (2 towns, 14 villages)
- October 1, 1926 - The village of Fukushima (福島村) was elevated to town status to become the town of Fukushima (福島町). (3 towns, 13 villages)
- December 1, 1940 - The village of Nangō (南郷村) was elevated to town status to become the town of Nangō. (4 towns, 12 villages)
- January 1, 1941 - The village of Hosoda (細田村) was elevated to town status to become the town of Hosoda (細田町). (5 towns, 11 villages)
- May 3, 1948 - The village of Agata (吾田村) was elevated to town status to become the town of Agata (吾田町). (6 towns, 10 villages)
- January 1, 1950 - The towns of Aburatsu, Obi and Agata, and the village of Tōgō (東郷村) were merged to create the city of Nichinan(日南市). (3 towns, 9 villages)
- January 1, 1951 - The town of Fukushima, and the village of Kitakata (北方村) were merged to create the town of Fukushima. (3 towns, 8 villages)
- November 3, 1954 - The town of Fukushima, and the villages of Ōtsuka (大束村), Ichiki (市木村), Honjō (本城村) and Toi (都井村) were merged to create the city of Kushima. (2 towns, 4 villages)
- February 11, 1955 - The town of Hosoda, and the village of Udo (鵜戸村) were merged into the city of Nichinan. (1 town, 3 villages)
- April 1, 1956: (1 town, 1 village)
  - The village of Sakatani (酒谷村) was merged into the city of Nichinan.
  - The village of Yowara (榎原村) was split into the town of Nangō and the city of Nichinan (respectively).
- January 1, 1959 - The village of Kitagō (北郷村) was elevated to town status to become the town of Kitagō. (2 towns)
- March 30, 2009 - The towns of Kitagō and Nangō were merged into the expanded city of Nichinan. Minaminaka District is dissolved.

明治22年以前	明治22年5月1日	明治22年 - 昭和19年	昭和20年 - 昭和29年		昭和30年 - 昭和63年	平成1年 - 現在	現在
	油津町	油津町	油津町	昭和25年1月1日 日南市	日南市	平成21年3月30日 日南市	日南市
	吾田村	明治41年 平野の一部を 油津町に編入	昭和23年5月3日 町制	昭和25年1月1日 日南市	日南市	平成21年3月30日 日南市	日南市
	飫肥村	明治33年1月1日 町制	飫肥町	昭和25年1月1日 日南市	日南市	平成21年3月30日 日南市	日南市
	東郷村	東郷村	東郷村	昭和25年1月1日 日南市	日南市	平成21年3月30日 日南市	日南市
	細田村	昭和16年1月1日 町制	細田町		昭和30年2月11日 日南市に編入	平成21年3月30日 日南市	日南市
	鵜戸村	鵜戸村	鵜戸村		昭和30年2月11日 日南市に編入	平成21年3月30日 日南市	日南市
	酒谷村	酒谷村	酒谷村		昭和31年4月1日 日南市に編入	平成21年3月30日 日南市	日南市
	榎原村	榎原村	榎原村		昭和31年4月1日 日南市に編入 （大窪の一部）	平成21年3月30日 日南市	日南市
	榎原村	榎原村	榎原村		昭和31年4月1日 南郷町に編入 （椿ノ口・大窪の一部）	平成21年3月30日 日南市	日南市
	南郷村	昭和15年12月1日 町制	南郷町		南郷町	平成21年3月30日 日南市	日南市
	北郷村	北郷村	北郷村		昭和34年1月1日 町制	平成21年3月30日 日南市	日南市
	福島村	大正15年10月1日 町制	昭和26年1月1日 福島町	昭和29年11月3日 串間市	串間市	串間市	串間市
	北方村	北方村	昭和26年1月1日 福島町	昭和29年11月3日 串間市	串間市	串間市	串間市
	大束村	大束村	大束村	昭和29年11月3日 串間市	串間市	串間市	串間市
	本城村	本城村	本城村	昭和29年11月3日 串間市	串間市	串間市	串間市
	市木村	市木村	市木村	昭和29年11月3日 串間市	串間市	串間市	串間市
	都井村	都井村	都井村	昭和29年11月3日 串間市	串間市	串間市	串間市

== See also ==
- List of dissolved districts of Japan
- Naka District, Hyūga
- Kitanaka District, Miyazaki(Dissolved in 1896)
- Naka District, Ibaraki
- Naka District, Saitama
- Naka District, Kagawa
- Naka District, Fukuoka
- Naka District, Tokushima
- Naka District, Shizuoka
- Naga District, Wakayama
- Naka District, Shimane
