= Tano, Miyazaki =

Dissolved municipality in Miyazaki prefecture, Japan

Tano (田野町, Tano-chō) was a town located in Miyazaki District, Miyazaki Prefecture, Japan.

As of 2003, the town had an estimated population of 12,066 and the density of 111.41 persons per km^{2}. The total area was 108.30 km^{2}.

On January 1, 2006, Tano, along with the town of Sadowara (also from Miyazaki District), and the town of Takaoka (from Higashimorokata District), was merged into the expanded city of Miyazaki and no longer exists as an independent municipality.
