= Takaoka, Miyazaki =

Dissolved municipality in Miyazaki prefecture, Japan

Takaoka (高岡町, Takaoka-chō) was a town located in Higashimorokata District, Miyazaki Prefecture, Japan.

As of 2003, the town had an estimated population of 12,621 and the density of 87.29 persons per km^{2}. The total area was 144.58 km^{2}.

On January 1, 2006, Takaoka, along with the towns of Sadowara and Tano (both from Miyazaki District), was merged into the expanded city of Miyazaki and no longer exists as an independent municipality.
