= Kitagō, Miyazaki (Minaminaka) =

Dissolved municipality in Miyazaki prefecture, Japan

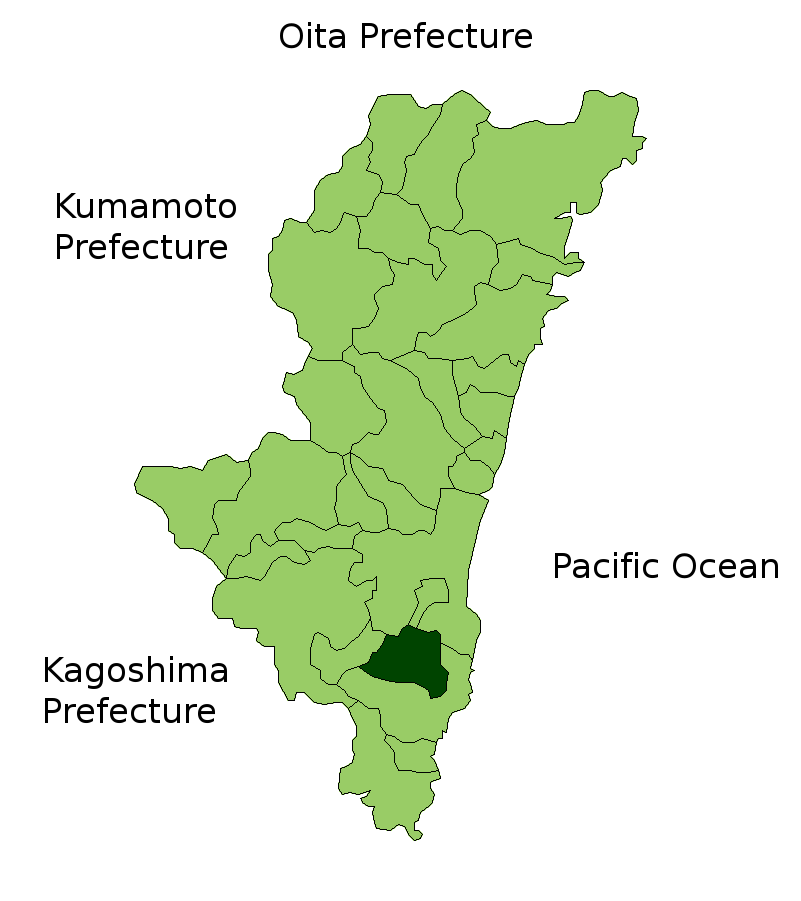
Location of Kitagō in Miyazaki Prefecture.

Kitago's Inohae Waterfall

Kitagō (北郷町, Kitagō-chō) was a town located in Minaminaka District, Miyazaki, Japan.

As of 2008, the town had an estimated population of 4,859 and a population density of 27.2 persons per km^{2}. The town's total area was 178.49 km^{2}.

On March 30, 2009, Kitagō, along with the town of Nangō (also from Minaminaka District), was merged into the expanded city of Nichinan. Minaminaka District was dissolved as a result of this merger.

It was bordered by Nichinan City to the south and east; Kiyotake Town and Miyazaki City to the north; and Mimata Town to the west.

Kitago literally means "north shire". The town is in the northern part of the former Obi Shire, Himuka.

== History ==
The town was established as a village in 1889 by merging the villages of Gonohara, Ofuji and Kitagawachi; which was later elevated to town status in 1959.

== Land use ==
- Rice Field: 2.2%
- Other Farmland: 1.1%
- Residential: 1.1%
- Mountain Forest: 88.2%
- Wilderness: 0.1%
- Mixed Use: 3.9%
- Other: 3.3%
