= Nangō, Miyazaki (Minaminaka) =

Dissolved municipality in Miyazaki prefecture, Japan

Coordinates: 31°31′18″N 131°21′0″E

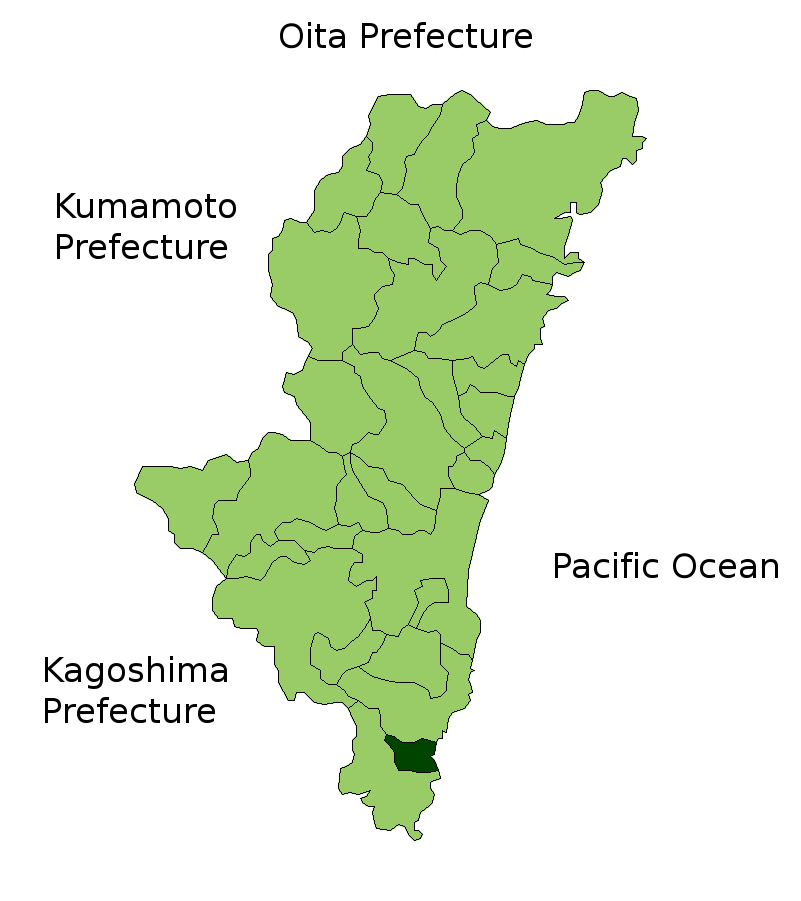
Location of Nangō in Miyazaki Prefecture.

Nangō (南郷町, Nangō-chō) was a town located in Minaminaka District, Miyazaki, Japan.

As of 2003, the town had an estimated population of 11,845 and the density of 187.51 persons per km^{2}. The total area was 63.17 km^{2}.

On March 30, 2009, Nangō, along with the town of Kitagō (also from Minaminaka District), was merged into the expanded city of Nichinan. Minaminaka District was dissolved as a result of this merger.

Nango literally means "south shire". The town is in the southern part of the former Obi Shire, Himuka.

== History ==
The municipality of Nangō was created on 1 May 1889 as part of the nationwide implementation of the modern municipal system (shi–chō–son system) during the Meiji era. It was formed by merging six smaller villages: Taninokuchi (谷之口), Wakimoto (脇本), Katagami (片上), Nienami (二重波見), Tsuyano (津屋野), and Nakamura (中村).

On 1 December 1940, the settlement was officially elevated from village (mura) to town (chō) status, becoming Nangō-chō.^{2} Throughout the mid-20th century, Nangō functioned as part of Minaminaka District, alongside Kitagō and other neighboring towns. Its economy historically relied on fishing, forestry, and agriculture, reflecting the region's coastal location and mountainous hinterland.

As part of Japan's nationwide wave of Heisei municipal mergers, Nangō was merged on 30 March 2009 with the town of Kitagō into the expanded city of Nichinan. Following this merger, Minaminaka District was dissolved.
