= Saigō, Miyazaki =

Dissolved municipality in Miyazaki prefecture, Japan

Saigo (西郷村, Saigō-son) was a village located in Higashiusuki District, Miyazaki Prefecture, Japan.

== Etymology ==
Saigo literally means "west shire". This village was a western quarter of so-called Irigo (literally Inlands Shire) area.

== Population ==
As of 2003, the village had an estimated population of 2,718 and the density of 19.65 persons per km^{2}. The total area was 138.32 km^{2}.

== History ==
The village was established in 1889 by merging the villages (now hamlets) of Obaru, Tashiro, Tateishi and Yamasanga.

On January 1, 2006, Saigō, along with the villages of Kitagō and Nangō (all from Higashiusuki District), was merged to create the town of Misato and no longer exists as an independent municipality.
