= Nangō, Miyazaki (Higashiusuki) =

Dissolved municipality in Miyazaki prefecture, Japan

Nangō (南郷村, Nangō-son) was a village located in Higashiusuki District, Miyazaki Prefecture, Japan.

As of 2003, the village had an estimated population of 2,479 and the density of 13.03 persons per km^{2}. The total area was 190.23 km^{2}.

On January 1, 2006, Nangō, along with the villages of Kitagō and Saigō (all from Higashiusuki District), was merged to create the town of Misato and no longer exists as an independent municipality.

Nango literally means "south shire". This village was a southern quarter of so-called Irigo (literally Inlands Shire) area.

== History ==
The village was established in 1889 by merging the villages (now hamlets) Kamidogawa, Nakadogawa, Mizushidani, Kijino and Mikado.
