= Kitagō, Miyazaki (Higashiusuki) =

Dissolved municipality in Miyazaki prefecture, Japan

Kitagō (北郷村, Kitagō-son) was a village located in Higashiusuki District, Miyazaki Prefecture, Japan.

As of 2003, the village had an estimated population of 1,985 and the density of 16.52 persons per km^{2}. The total area was 120.17 km^{2}.

On January 1, 2006, Kitagō, along with the villages of Nangō and Saigō (all from Higashiusuki District), was merged to create the town of Misato and no longer exists as an independent municipality.

Kitago literally means "north shire". This village was a northern quarter of so-called Irigo (literally Inlands Shire) area.

== History ==
The village was established in 1889 by merging the villages (now hamlets) of Unama, Kurogi and Nyushita.
