= Kiyotake, Miyazaki =

Dissolved municipality in Miyazaki district, Miyazaki prefecture, Japan

Coordinates: 31°51′35″N 131°23′14″E

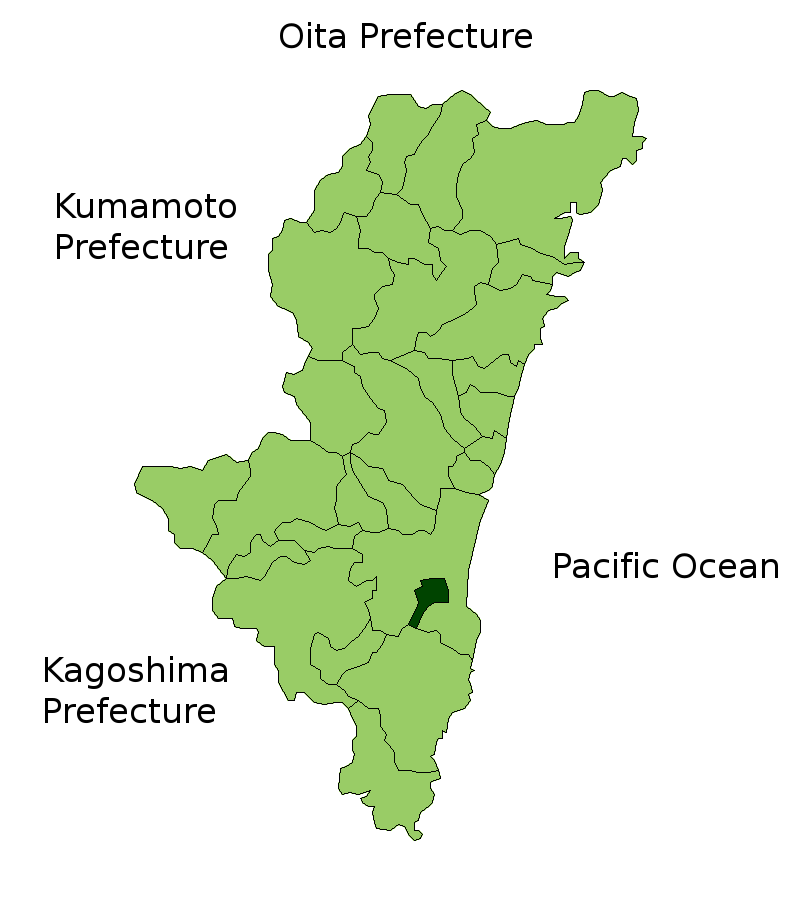
Location of Kiyotake in Miyazaki

Kiyotake (清武町, Kiyotake-chō) was a town located in Miyazaki District, Miyazaki Prefecture, Japan.

As of 2003, the town had an estimated population of 28,937 and the density of 605.25 persons per km^{2}. The total area was 47.81 km^{2}.

On March 23, 2010, Kiyotake was merged into the expanded city of Miyazaki and no longer exists as an independent municipality. Miyazaki District was dissolved as a result of this merger.
