= Higashimorokata District, Miyazaki =

District in Miyazaki prefecture, Japan

Coordinates: 31°59′N 131°19′E

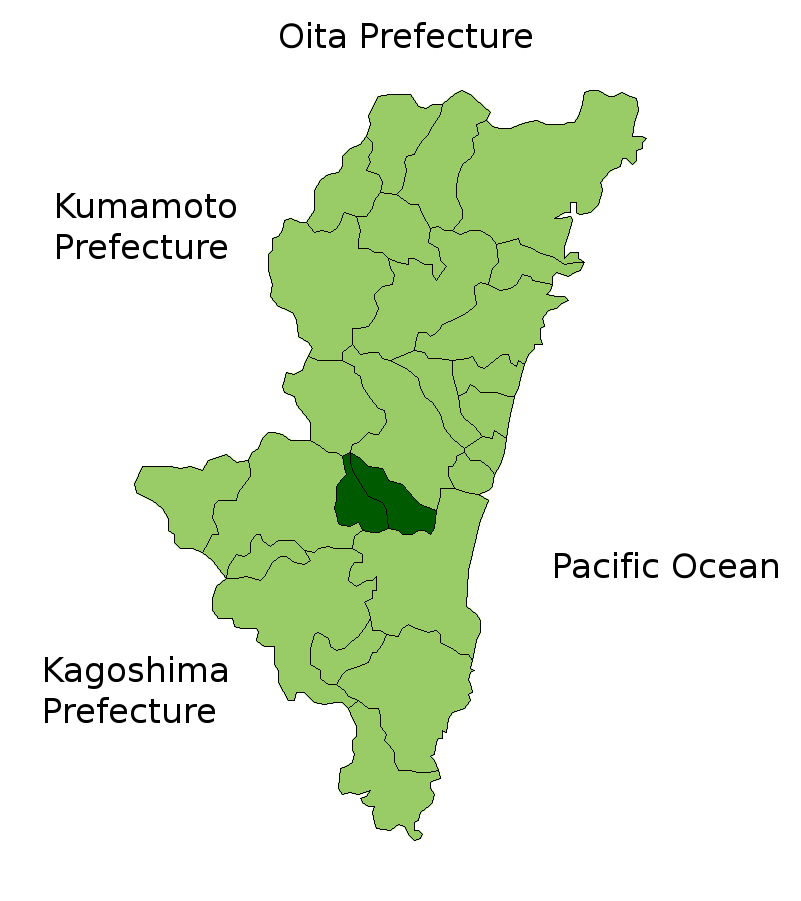
Higashimorokata District in Miyazaki Prefecture

Higashimorokata (東諸県郡, Higashimorokata-gun) is a district located in Miyazaki Prefecture, Japan.

As of October 1, 2019, the district has an estimated population of 25,740 and the density of 114 persons per km^{2}. The total area is 225.82 km^{2}.

== Towns and villages ==
- Aya
- Kunitomi

== Merger ==
- On January 1, 2006 the town of Takaoka merged into the city of Miyazaki.
