= Sadowara Castle =

Castle in Miyazaki, Japan

Coordinates: 32°2′52.2″N 131°25′25.8″E

- 佐土原城
- Sadowara, Miyazaki Japan
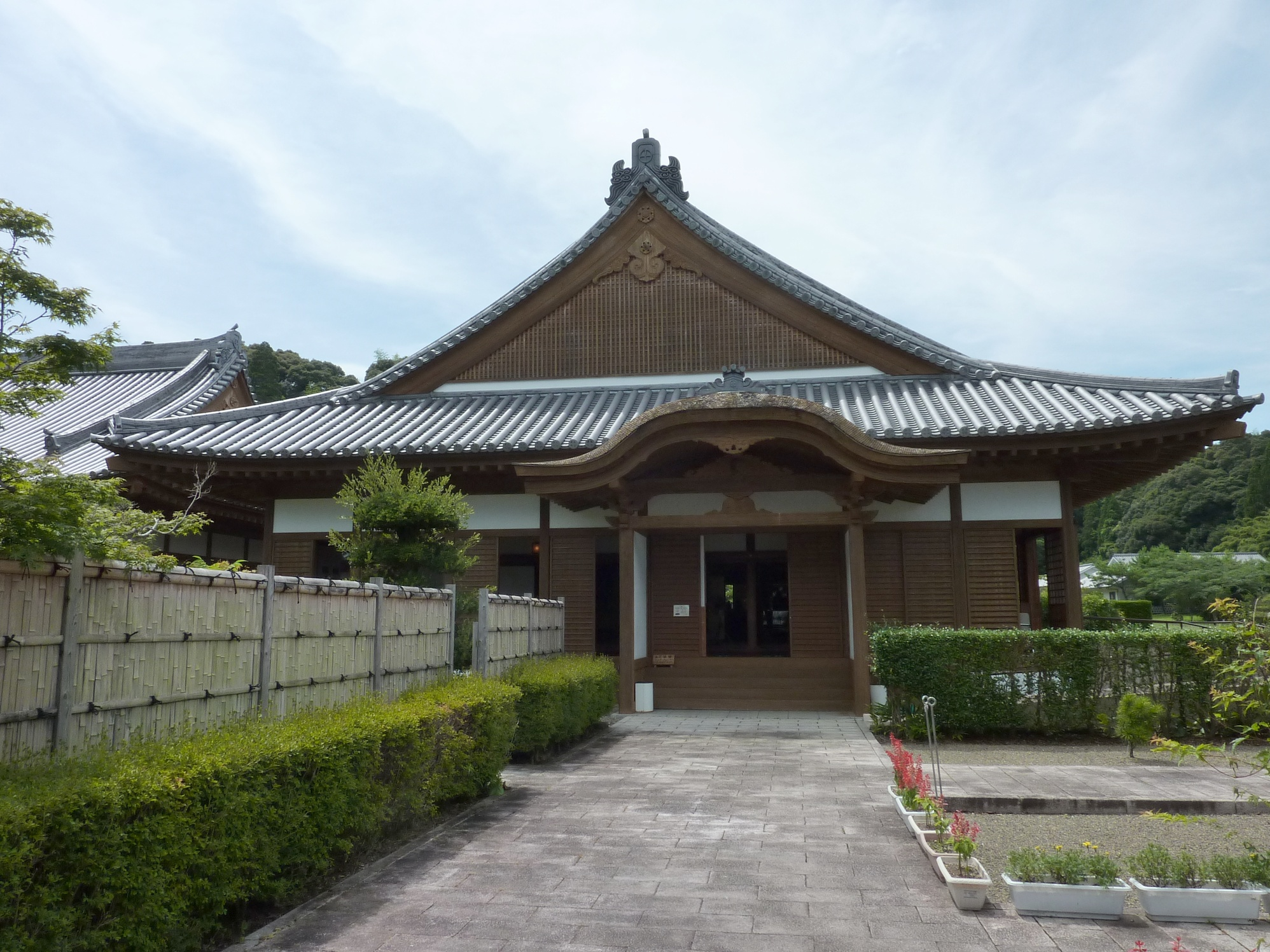
- Sadowara Castle Historical Museum

Site information
- Type: yamajiro-style Japanese castle
- Controlled by: Ito clan, Shimazu clan
- Open to the public: yes
- Condition: Archaeological and designated national historical site; castle ruins

Location
- Location within Miyazaki Prefecture Location within Japan

Site history
- Built: C. Kamakura period
- In use: Sengoku - Edo period

Garrison information
- Past commanders: Itō Yoshisuke, Shimazu Iehisa, Shimazu Toyohisa
- National Historic Site of Japan

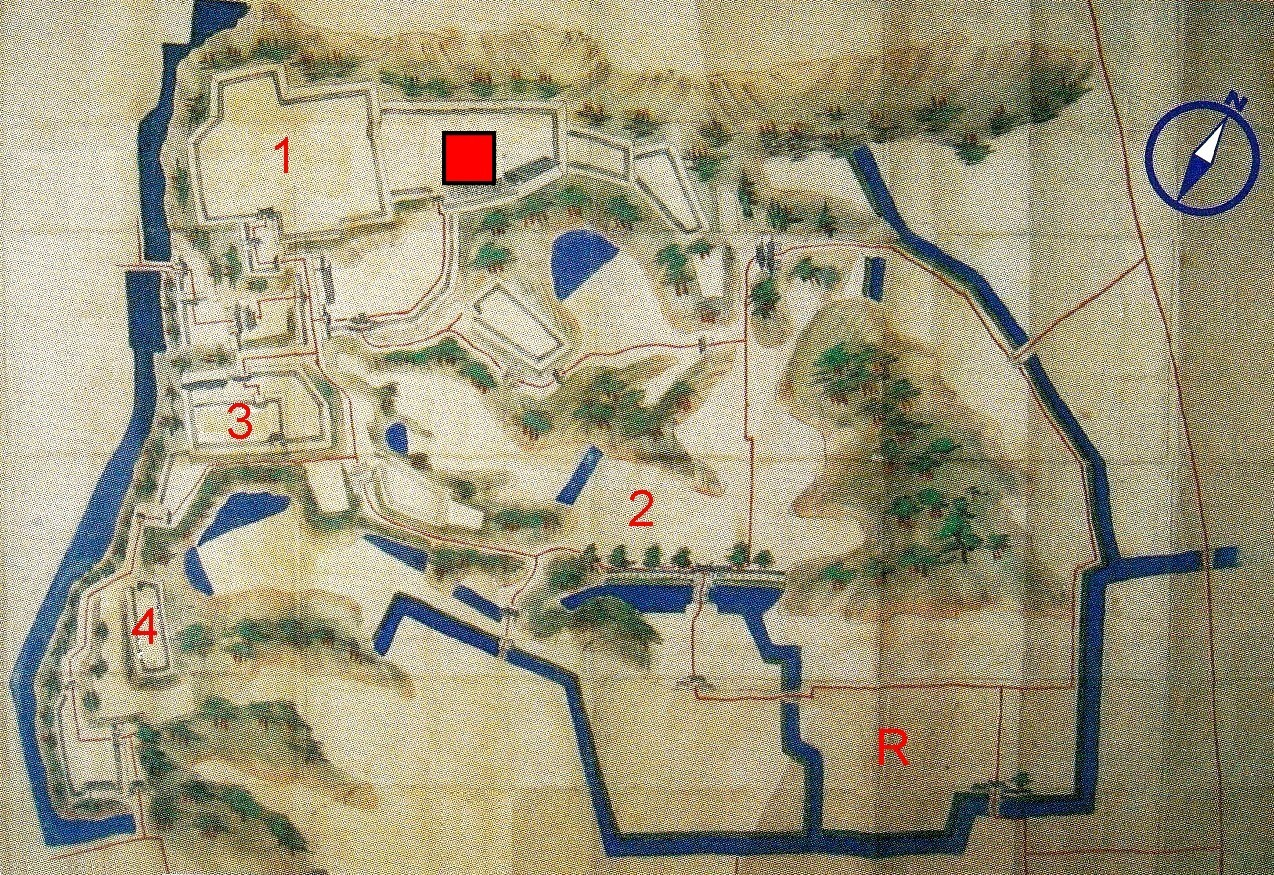
Old map of the castle

Sadowara Castle (佐土原城, Sadowara-jō) is a Japanese castle located in the Sadowara neighborhood of the city of Miyazaki, Miyazaki Prefecture, on the island of Kyushu, Japan. It is also called Tsurumatsu Castle (鶴松城, Tsurumatsu-jō), and later Shōkaku Castle (松鶴城, Shōkaku-jō). During the Sengoku period, it was the stronghold of the Itō clan and later was controlled by the Shimazu clan. Shimazu Toyohisa was command of the castle. During the Edo period, the castle was headquarters of Sadowara Domain, which ruled portions of Hyūga Province (modern-day Miyazaki) from 1603 to 1871. The castle site has been a National Historic Site since 2004.

== History ==
Sadowara Castle is located on Mount Kakusho, a 100-meter hill in the center of Sadowara town, 15 kilometer north from the urban center of Miyazaki city. The plateau area between the Hitotsuse River and Ōyodo River north of Miyazaki city was historically the stronghold of the Itō clan from the Kamakura period. Sadowara Castle is in the middle of north line of plateau, at entrance of small valley controlling access to the top of plateau. It is thought Sadowara Castle is used as a residence and administrative base to manage commercial town and river port, and Tonokōri Castle about five kilometers to the east was the main military base.

The Itō clan claimed descent from Kudō Suketsune, who had been famously assassinated as per the events recounted in the Soga Monogatari. His son, Itō Suketoki, had been awarded estates in Hyūga Province by Minamoto no Yoritomo and these were managed by a cadet branch of the clan who took the surname of "Tajima", who constructed the castle as "Tajima Castle" in the mid-14th century. However, it was not until the Nanboku-chō period in which the main line of the Itō clan relocated to Hyūga by order of Ashikaga Takauji, and renamed the castle "Sadowara Castle" as their stronghold. After a major fire in 1537, Itō Yoshitsuke significantly expanded Sadowara Castle to encompass the whole mountain and renamed it "Tsurumatsu Castle". As was common with mountain castles of the period, Sadowara Castle consisted of numerous enclosures, protected by earthen ramparts and dry moats, extending along the ridge of the mountain and making use of the natural terrain as part of its defenses. An old illustration of castle shows there was three-story tenshu, and an archaeological excavation based on this picture found the ruins of its foundation in the inner bailey, along with that of a masugata-style compound gate. The remains of 14th century ceramics, and a shachihoko roof tile with gold-leaf have also been found.

In the early Sengoku period, the Itō clan expanded to rule most of Hyūga conquering areas to the north to the border of Bungo Province, and (after a protracted campaign), wresting Obi Castle to the south from the Shimazu clan in 1569. However, Itō Yoshitsuke's successor, Itō Yoshimasu, was not the military leader his father had been, and in 1572 was decisively defeated by the Shimazu, who captured Sadowara Castle, forcing the Itō clan into exile.

After the fall of Itō clan, the Shimazu clan placed Shimazu Iehisa (1547-1587), younger brother of the warlord Shimazu Yoshihisa (1533-1611) as castellan of Sadowara. Shimazu Iehisa was excellent commander, defeating the numerically superior army of Ryuzoji clan with a small force at the Battle of Okitanawate in 1584, and serving in the vanguard at the Battle of Hetsugigawa. However, just after the surrender of Shimazu clan to Toyotomi Hideyoshi in 1587, Iehisa suddenly died at Sadowara Castle, and it was rumored that he had been poisoned by order of Hideyoshi. Yoshihisa's younger brother, Shimazu Yoshihiro, who was also an accomplished and experienced general, served in the Western Army loyal to Toyotomi Hidetsugu at the 1600 Battle of Sekigahara. When the defeat of the pro-Toyotomi Western Army became evident, he led his forces in a breakthrough of the Eastern Army advance guard, which enabled the Shimazu forces to escape from the conflict and return to Kyushu. After the battle, the victorious Tokugawa Ieyasu ordered that Sadowara Castle be surrendered; however, the Tokugawa turned it over to Shimazu Mochihisa from a cadet branch of the Shimazu clan, and created Sadowara Domain. It is a matter of debate as to whether this was to make favor to the Shimazu clan, or to create an alternative Shimazu house with loyalty directly to the Tokugawa shogunate is a matter of debate, but the Sadowara branch of the Shimazu clan would continue to rule Sadowara Domain to the Meiji restoration. Sadowara Castle was rebuilt in 1611 with stone walls, a tenshu, and yagura turrets. The tenshu at Sadowara is the southernmost in Japan, as it was the policy of the Shimazu clan not to construct such structures, even at Kagoshima Castle.

The tenshu was lost only 14 years after its completion, mainly due to fiscal issues. The entire hilltop area of the castle was abolished in 1625 under Shimazu Tadaoki, as there was no longer possibility of external conflict and maintaining the hilltop fortifications was expensive. The official name of the castle was changed to "Shokaku Castle", although the castle continued to be popularly referred to as Sadowara Castle. In the late Bakumatsu period and in the first years of the Meiji period, Sadowara Domain planned to relocate its seat to a newly-built Hirose Castle, but the abolition of the han system occurred in 1870, before the move could be made.

== Current ==
At present, there are no structures on the hilltop, but the general shape of hilltop area still remains, with remnants of low walls and earthworks. In the secondary area, the daimyō residence was partially reconstructed in 1993, based on the results of archaeological excavations. Sadohara Castle historical museum is on site.

The castle was listed as one of the Continued Top 100 Japanese Castles in 2017.

== Literature ==
- Benesch, Oleg and Ran Zwigenberg (2019). Japan's Castles: Citadels of Modernity in War and Peace. Cambridge: Cambridge University Press. p. 374. ISBN 9781108481946.
- De Lange, William (2021). An Encyclopedia of Japanese Castles. Groningen: Toyo Press. pp. 600 pages. ISBN 978-9492722300.

== See also ==
- List of Historic Sites of Japan (Miyazaki)
