= Siege of Kagoshima =

1587 battle in Japan

Coordinates: 31.59667°N 130.55722°E

- Part of Toyotomi Hideyoshi's Kyūshū Campaign
Date	1587
Location	Kagoshima, Satsuma Province, Japan
Result	Toyotomi Hideyoshi victory through negotiation
Territorial changes	Satsuma (and most of Kyūshū) falls to Hideyoshi

Belligerents
Forces of Toyotomi Hideyoshi	Forces of the Shimazu clan

Commanders and leaders
Hashiba Hidenaga; Katō Kiyomasa; Fukushima Masanori; Kuroda Yoshitaka; Takayama Ukon	Shimazu Yoshihisa; Shimazu Yoshihiro; Shimazu Toshihisa; Shimazu Iehisa; Uwai Satokane

Strength
60,000	11,000

The 1587 siege of Kagoshima took place during Japan's Sengoku period, and was the last stand of the Shimazu family against the forces of Toyotomi Hideyoshi. This was the final battle in Hideyoshi's campaign to take Kyūshū.

Following the Shimazu defeat at Sendaigawa, the Shimazu then retreated to their home castle of Kagoshima. Hideyoshi's forces numbering roughly 60,000, then made a landing, having set off from Akune. Under the leadership of Hashiba Hidenaga, Fukushima Masanori, Katō Kiyomasa, and Kuroda Yoshitaka, they then surrounded the city. The land-based divisions, which were not on the boats from Akune, had traversed the volcanic valleys defending the city with the help of local monks. In the end, however, negotiation precluded any fighting.

== See also ==
- Bombardment of Kagoshima (1862)
