= Shimazu Toyohisa =

Japanese samurai (1570–1600)

- 島津 豊久

Lord of Sadowara Castle
- In office 1587–1600
- Preceded by: Shimazu Iehisa

Personal details
- Born: July 1570
- Died: October 21, 1600 (aged 30) Battle of Sekigahara
- Resting place: Tenshouji graveyard
- Spouse: Daughter of Shimazu Tadanaga
- Parents: Shimazu Iehisa (father); a daughter of Kabayama Yoshihisa (mother)
- Relatives: Shimazu Mitsuhisa (brother); Shimazu Tadanao (brother) sister (wife of Nejime Shigehira) sister (wife of Sata Hisayoshi) sister (wife of Shimazu Hisanobu & Sagara Yoriyasu); Shimazu Tadatsune (cousin); Shimazu Yoshihiro (uncle); Shimazu Yoshihisa (uncle); Shimazu Toshihisa (uncle)
- Other work: Chamberlain (Jijyuu); Ministry of Central Affairs (Nakatsukasashou)
- Nickname(s): Houjumaru (豊寿丸); Tadatoyo (忠豊); Ten'rei Shōun (天岑昌運); Matashichirou (又七郎)

Military service
- Allegiance: Shimazu clan Toyotomi clan Western Army
- Unit: Shimazu clan
- Battles/wars: Battle of Okitanawate (1584); Kyūshū campaign (1587); Siege of Odawara (1590); Korean campaign (1592-1598); Battle of Sekigahara (1600)

Shimazu Toyohisa (島津 豊久; July, 1570 – October 21, 1600) or Shimazu Tadatoyo, son of Shimazu Iehisa and nephew of Shimazu Yoshihiro, was a Japanese samurai who was a member of the Shimazu clan. He was also the castle lord in command of Sadowara Castle. He served in the Battle of Kyushu (1587) under his uncle against the Toyotomi. He fought bravely, but was ambushed off route when he charged forward. He was saved by his uncle. His wife was the daughter of Shimazu Tadanaga, cousin and karō to Shimazu Yoshihisa.

== Early life ==
Shimazu Toyohisa was born in 1570 as Shimazu Iehisa's child. Houjumaru was his childhood name, and he was originally called Shimazu Tadatoyo before changing his name to Toyohisa. On June 1, 1583, Uwai Satokane traveled to Sadowara, but his father, Iehisa, was not there. And before he received his genpuku, Toyohisa was regarded as a full-fledged military commander.

When Toyohisa was 14 years old in 1583 (Tensho 11), the Shimazu clan's chief vassal, Uwai Satokane, paid a visit to Sadowara Castle, which was his home. Since his father, Shimazu Iehisa, was not present at the time, it is said that Toyohisa, who was standing in front of his genpuku, replied. About the fact that he had not yet had his manhood ceremony, he defeated one of the enemy's leaders when under the guardianship of Niiro Tadamoto. Toyohisa also made his first appearance before his genpuku.

=== Battle of Okitanawate ===
Ryuzoji Takanobu, based in Hizen Province (currently Saga and Nagasaki prefectures), and Okita, commanded by Shimazu Iehisa, clashed with the Shimazu-Arima Allied Force in 1584 (Tensho 12). He took part in the Battle of Okitanawate and has a list of the enemy's commanders. Shimazu Iehisa defeated more than 25,000 Ryuzoji troops in the fight for dominance in Kyushu with just around 6,000 troops. Ryuzoji Takanobu, the enemy general, was also killed, and his heroism was celebrated in Kyushu. A story from the battle of Okitanawate illustrates the relationship between Shimazu Iehisa and Shimazu Toyohisa. Iehisa grew concerned about his son Toyohisa on the eve of the war and encouraged him to come home. Toyohisa Shimazu, on the other hand, flatly denied, saying, "Even if you are in your homeland, if you know your father's problems, you will come to see him, but if you leave on the eve of the war, even if you are young, it will be a shame until the last generation." Shimazu Iehisa saw his son's armor on the day of the final battle and said, "It's been a wonderful warrior."

He retied the sash after thanking him and promising Toyohisa, "If I can succeed today and live, my father can untie this upper belt." He dispatched him to the fight. Iehisa and Toyohisa are said to have fought fiercely in Okitanawate, and Iehisa is said to have untied Toyohisa's obi.

He celebrated his coming-of-age ceremony in Higo Province on May 23, 1584. In February 1586, Uwai Satokane told his father, Iehisa, that he needed a medicine called 'Sokoen' to cure the smallpox of Toyohisa's three brothers.

== Kyushu Campaign ==
=== Battle of Hetsugigawa ===
Even after his genpuku, Toyohisa and his father met a daunting adversary. Toyotomi Hideyoshi invaded Kyushu in 1587 (Tensho 15), at the behest of Otomo Sorin, daimyō of Bungo Province (currently Oita Prefecture).

Shimazu Iehisa and Shimazu Toyohisa, joined by over 10,000 troops, surrounded Tsuruga Castle (now Oita City, Oita Prefecture) near the Hetsugigawa River in Bungo Province at the time. The forces of Chosokabe Motochika, Chosokabe Nobuchika, Sengoku Hidehisa, Sogō Masayasu, and others came here as an advance corps of the Toyotomi army.

The Toyotomi army is a massive army of over 20,000 soldiers (actual work is about 6,000 people). As a result, the Shimazu army lifted the siege of the castle, buried the corps in the forest while withdrawing, and prepared to fight.

When the Toyotomi army knew about the retreat of the Shimazu army, they began to cross the Toji River, but the Shimazu army swooped in. Toyotomi's army was caught off guard, and the defeated soldiers came out one after the other. During the deadly battle, more than 1,000 people were killed or injured by the Shimazu army, and Chōsokabe Nobuchika and Sogō Masayasu were killed in battle. The Shimazu army won the Battle of Hetsugigawa, which became the first battle of the Kyushu Campaign.

In addition, Shimazu Iehisa and Shimazu Toyohisa have defeated three daimyō in total: Ryuzoji Takanobu in the Battle of Okitanawate and Chōsokabe Nobuchika and Sogō Masayasu in the Battle of Hetsugigawa. There is no other warlord who defeated so many daimyō in the field throughout the Sengoku Period.

== Service under Hideyoshi ==
=== Lord of Sadowara Castle ===
On July 10, 1587, his father, Iehisa, died, and in 1588, he took over the traces and received a red seal and a list of territories in 979 towns such as Sadowara, Sadowara, Hyuga Province. Became the lord of the castle.

That year, the Shimazu surrendered to Toyotomi Hideyoshi, and Iehisa died suddenly after returning from the Toyotomi camp, likely due to assassination or poisoning. It is said that he ordered Shimazu Yoshihiro to give it. In addition, after the death of his father, his uncle Yoshihiro raised him as if he were his own child, Toyohisa is said to have learned the art of the war from his uncle.

After that, he participated in the conquest of Odawara in 1590 by the Toyotomi clan. In 1592, he served in the Invasion of Korea, which he sent troops to Korea.

=== Invasion of Korea ===
On May 3, he landed in Busan with about 30 cavalry and 500 miscellaneous soldiers, and invaded to the gate, but the Korean King Seonjo had fled to Uiju. When he was in Chuncheon Castle in Gangwon Province in early May, he besieged about 6 million enemy soldiers with about 500 people, fired 100 guns, and when the enemy stood up, he successfully repelled them with about 500 people from the castle gate. On May 20, the same year, he was ordered to capture Jinju and led 476 people. In 1593, at the Siege of Jinju (1593), the banner of Shimazu Toyohisa's army takes the first place. The name of Shimazu Toyohisa became known to the generals. On February 21, 1597 (Keicho 2), while he was on duty at Gadeokdo, he was ordered to sortie again, and Toyohisa was the third with 800 people. He was stationed at Angolpo. On July 15, the same year, he participated in the Battle of Chilcheolyang. Toyohisa, who rowed to the 3rd Great Ship of the Korean navy, was so active that it was recorded that 'he jumped to the enemy ship and slashed the enemy like hemp,' and the ship he took from the enemy while competing with the vassals was later presented to the Toyotomi government and received a letter of appreciation. On August 15 of the same year, he participated in the Siege of Namwon Castle in the vanguard and killed 13 enemy heads, and on the next day, he returned to Japan with the noses of the enemy heads. On September 20, the same year, he returned to Sacheon and commissioned Sacheon Castle. In December of the same year, he set out for the Siege of Ulsan Castle as the rear-guard. In January 1598, when attacking Hikoyo Castle, which was defended by Ming's soldiers. He advanced with a single horse and defeated the second-class enemy leader, but was injured his left ear. In August of the same year, he was ordered to return to Japan with Akizuki Tanenaga, Mototane Takahashi, and Sagara Yorifusa. He was ordered to return to Japan with him. On November 21, the same year, he stayed on Shiikijima in front of Busan on 20 ships, rescued Yoshihiro's father and son, and returned to Japan two days later. On February, 1599, he became a vice-minister to the Ministry of Central Affairs due to his achievements in Korea.

On March 29, 1599, Tokugawa Ieyasu ordered him to return to his territory and consult with Shimazu Yoshihisa, and arrived at Sadowara. In early June of the same year, he went to the Shonai War due to Shimazu Tadatsune's departure for the front. He became the general of the attack on Yamada Castle with Tadamoto Niiro and Shigeho Murao, and captured it, and on April 12, 1600, the Shonai War ended with the surrender of Ijuin Tadazane. For this achievement, he was given a letter of commendation and a sword by Shimazu Tadatsune. After the war ended, Shimazu Yoshihisa decided to give Nomiya (present Nomiya-cho, Miyakonojo City, Miyazaki Prefecture) to Toyohisa's military exploits, but Toyohisa declined the offer.

== Battle of Sekigahara ==
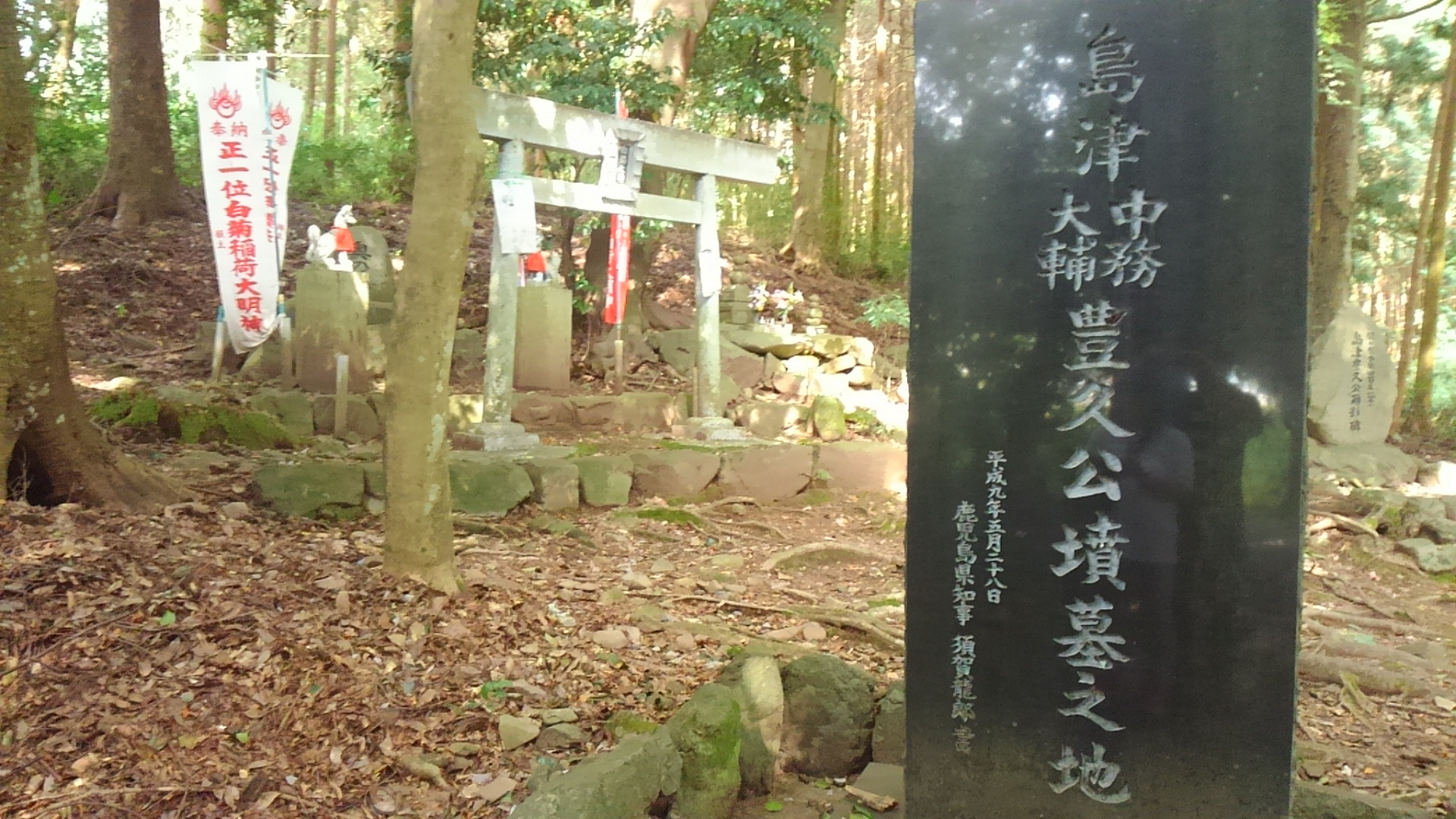
Tomb of Shimazu Toyohisa

On May 12, 1600, he left Sadowara to work in Fushimi and went to Osaka on June 5 to demand time for his return home. On August 1 of the same year, he joined the Western Army together with Yoshihiro and participated in the Battle of Fushimi-jo Castle. After the fall of Fushimi-jo Castle, on August 15 of the same year, he went from Fushimi to Sawayama, the castle of Ishida Mitsunari, and departed for the front in Mino Province. Based on the information that the East Army will attack Gifu Castle, Ishida Mitsunari asks Toyohisa to defend Etonowatari. On August 23 of the same year, he took control of Gifu Castle, but when he heard that the enemy was trying to block the back, he retreated to Gakuta outside Ogaki Castle.

When the Battle of Sekigahara broke out, he joined the Western Army together with his uncle Yoshihiro. It is said that Yoshihiro sent Toyohisa to Mitsunari Ishida's headquarters on September 14, 1600, and proposed a night attack against the Kanto army while in Akasaka, but Mitsunari rejected the proposal because his army was a horde and he decided to fight in Hirono during the day. However, it was said that Yoshihiro did not participate in the battle because he was distrustful of the Western Army who did not listen to the night attack proposed by him, but this anecdote was written in a secondary compilation called "ochko Shu"(collection of collected land), and since there are almost no articles on night attack in the historical materials of the Shimazu side, it can not be said that it is a historical fact. That night, the camp was changed to Sekigahara, and the camp was formed about a town from Ishida's camp in a dense fog under the rain before dawn on September 15. Then, Yoshihiro also took up his position at a distance of about a quarter. Toyohisa's preparations were greeted by Choujuin Morijun, who begged for time on horseback. "Our allies are weak today, but we can still hit them today," Toyohisa replied, and they parted, laughing at each other. When Sukezaemon Hachijima, a vassal of Mitsunari Ishida, came as a messenger to ask for help, the vassals cursed him for offering help from horseback instead of dismounting, and Toyohisa, furious at the messenger's attitude, shouted back, "Today, all of you can take credit for what you have done, and you should all be aware of the same thing.

It is said that Toyohisa, who lost sight of Yoshihiro once in the middle of the battle, was worried about what he would do with his tears, and that he was able to join Yoshihiro after that. Later, when the Eastern Army became dominant in the battle, the Shimazu Army became isolated in the battlefield, and Yoshihiro was forced to commit seppuku when he refused to retreat. However, Toyohisa felt that his uncle Yoshihiro needed to return alive to face the difficult situation that came after the war and said, 'The existence of the Shimazu family depends on Yoshihiro. You must survive.' Fighting is clear. I will die here. Yoshihiro should lead his army back to Satsuma. The existence of the nation was entirely dependent on the Lord (Yoshihiro)," he said, and urged his uncle to withdraw. Yoshihiro decided to withdraw to the direction of Ise-kaido Road without knowing Ieyasu's headquarters. Toyohisa served as the rear guard in this battle, but the Eastern army fiercely chased the Shimazu army, and the Shimazu army also suffered many casualties. Naomasa Ii's forces approached, and fired a volley once, resulting in a battle. Toyohisa, who became a scapegoat for Yoshihiro, rushed into the army with 13 horsemen including Gensuke Nakamura, Sadaemon Uehara, and Shodayu Toyama and died in battle. According to Sappan Kyuki-zatsuroku (Miscellaneaous Records of old Satsuma), 'He defeated Naomasa Ii with a gun and drove off the punitive force of the East Army. There is a description of Shimazu Toyohisa and a large amount of bleeding.'

According to one theory, Toyohisa followed Yoshihiro for nearly nine kilometers while he was seriously injured, and the chief priests and chief village officers of Ruriko-ji Temple held him, but he died around Kashiwara in Kamishizu, was cremated and buried in the nearby Ruriko-ji Temple, and a grave is still in existence at the temple. It is also said that a horse of Toyohisa was found in the saddle with a pool of blood and a main part of the horse was lost quite early. In any case, Toyohisa and others did die hard and Yoshihiro was able to return to Satsuma safely. However, it seems that the Shimazu side did not have any proof of the death of Toyohisa, and Shimazu Yoshihiro made Oshikawa Kinchika call himself Sankokuzo-mairi to investigate the safety of Toyohisa, and Kinchika traveled around the country for three years. Toyohisa's Buddhist name was 'Tenshin Shoun.' Incidentally, "Sekigahara Battle Picture Folding Screen" owned by Gifu City Museum of History depicts the figure of Toyohisa, who is in command of the horse.

== Aftermath ==
After the war, Sadowara, his territory, was temporarily confiscated by the Tokugawa family for the extinction of the family line, and Shoda Yasuhisa, a yoriki (a police sergeant) of Yamaguchi Naotomo, was appointed to the post, and later Shimazu Mochihisa, a member of the family, entered the post. Toyohisa had no children, and his niece's husband, Kiiri Tadahide, succeeded the family. However, the line was discontinued in 1624. Hisao, the son of Shimazu Iehisa (Tadatsune), the 18th family head, became his heir and remained as the Nagakichi Shimazu family.

Moreover, Shimazu Hisatoshi, a nephew born in 1602, and Shimazu Hisanobu, Hisatoshi's father and Toyohisa's younger brother-in-law, declined to succeed to the lord of the Sadowara Domain after Yoshihisa's death.

It is said that Toyohisa's armor was obtained by Shimazu Hisayoshi, the head of the Nagayoshi-Shimazu family, in 1777 and stored in Tensho-ji Temple, the family temple of the Nagayoshi-Shimazu clan, and now it is kept in Shoko Shusei-kan Hall, where a copy of it is exhibited at Heki City Central Community Center.

== Personality and anecdotes ==
According to the historical materials of the Satsuma Domain, "Shizumi no Madake" (The Dance of Yamato), which describes the young Toyohisa who led the vanguard in the first battle, describes him as a boy who was not only beautiful but also beautiful and brave," and also beautiful as a boy who excelled in both intelligence and bravery.'

Kumagusu Minakata was also told by Miharu Arakawa, a diplomat from Satsuma, that he was a Beautiful Boy besides Toyohisa Shimazu. In the face of the Seikan no eki (conquest of Korea), he called the brave warriors in the family to the front of each and every one of them.Therefore, he thought that the Lord loved all the fierce warriors, and he told everyone to fight hard at once.'

In the Battle of Sekigahara, he was called off and joined by Shimazu Yoshihiro just before he returned to Sadowara from Kyoto while he was staying, but it is not that his personal connection with Yoshihiro was deeply engraved in the materials.

== Popular culture ==
- Shimazu Toyohisa (voiced by Yūichi Nakamura) is the main character in Hirano Kouta's Drifters, where he fights alongside Oda Nobunaga, Nasu no Yoichi, and other historical figures in a fantasy world.
- He is also a playable character in Koei Tecmo's Samurai Warriors 4, where he is part of the Shimazu clan.
