= Siege of Oguchi Castle =

Historical battle

- Part of Sengoku period
| Date | 1569 |
| Location | Oguchi Castle, Satsuma Province 35°19′57″N 136°54′28″E |
| Result | Shimazu victory |

Belligerents
| Shimazu clan | Hishikari clan |

Commanders and leaders
| Shimazu Takahisa; Shimazu Yoshihisa; Shimazu Iehisa | Hishikari Takaaki; Marume Nagayoshi |

Strength
| | 8,000 |

The siege of Oguchi Castle was fought in the year of 1569 when forces of the Shimazu clan besieged the Hishikari clan's Oguchi Castle in Satsuma Province. The siege was successful and the castle fell to the Shimazu.
