= Kamachi Akimori =

Kamachi Akimori (蒲池 鑑盛; 1520 - December 7, 1578) was a Japanese samurai lord and retainer of the Ōtomo clan during the Sengoku period. Akimori served under Ōtomo Sōrin. He was known as a skilled military commander and was also considered to be one of the "Great Pillars" along with Takahashi Shigetane for the Ōtomo clan, serving in all their major campaigns.

On 1578, Sōrin attacked the Takajo Castle of the Shimazu clan. The castle garrison led by Yamada Arinobu, gathered 500 troops to hold ground at Takajo Castle. Yamada managed to defend the castle and this led to a decline in the morale of the Otomo troops. Shimazu Iehisa and Yamada Arinobu sallied from Takajo castle and attacked the Otomo army from the rear. Later, the Shimazu army defeated Otomo's, who retreated under heavy losses at Battle of Mimigawa. Kamachi Akimori killed in the battle.
