= Kokubu Castle =

Castle in Kagoshima, Japan

- 国分城
- Kirishima, Kagoshima Prefecture, Japan
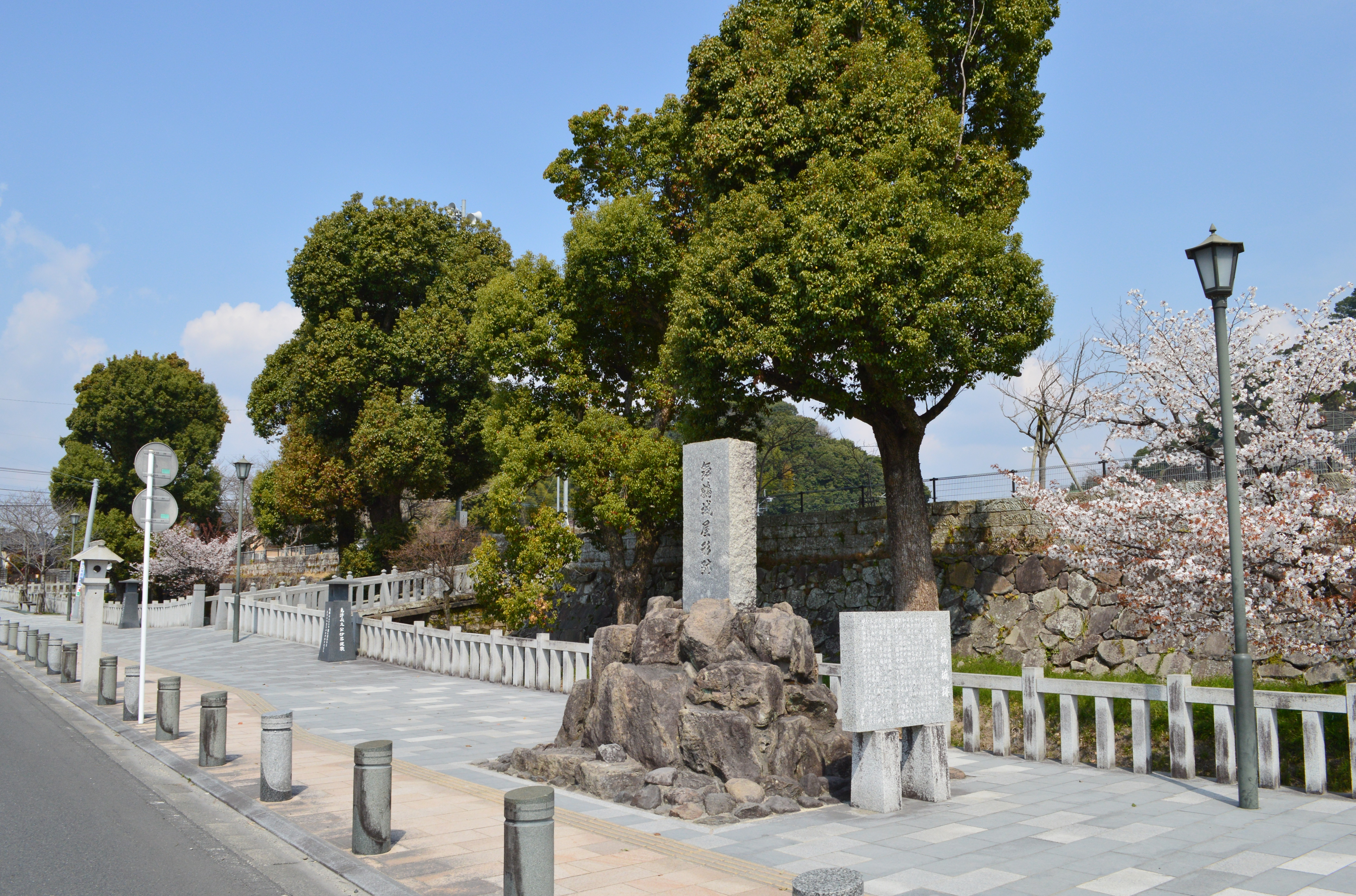
- Stone wall of Kokubu Castle

Site information
- Type: Hirajiro-style castle
- Owner: Shimazu clan
- Condition: ruins

Location
- Coordinates: 31°44′26″N 130°46′25″E

Site history
- Built: 1604
- Built by: Shimazu Yoshihiro

Garrison information
- Past commanders: Shimazu Yoshihiro, Shimazu Kameju

Kokubu Castle (国分城, Kokubu-jō) also called Maizuru Castle is the remains of a castle structure in Kirishima, Kagoshima Prefecture, Japan. The site is called a Kokubu castle, but it is a fortified residence rather than a castle.

In 1604, Shimazu Yoshihiro built the castle and moved from Tomiguma Castle. Shimazu Yoshihisa lived a retired life in the castle and died on January 21, 1611.

Currently Kokubu elementary school is on site, but stone walls, moats and gates still remain.

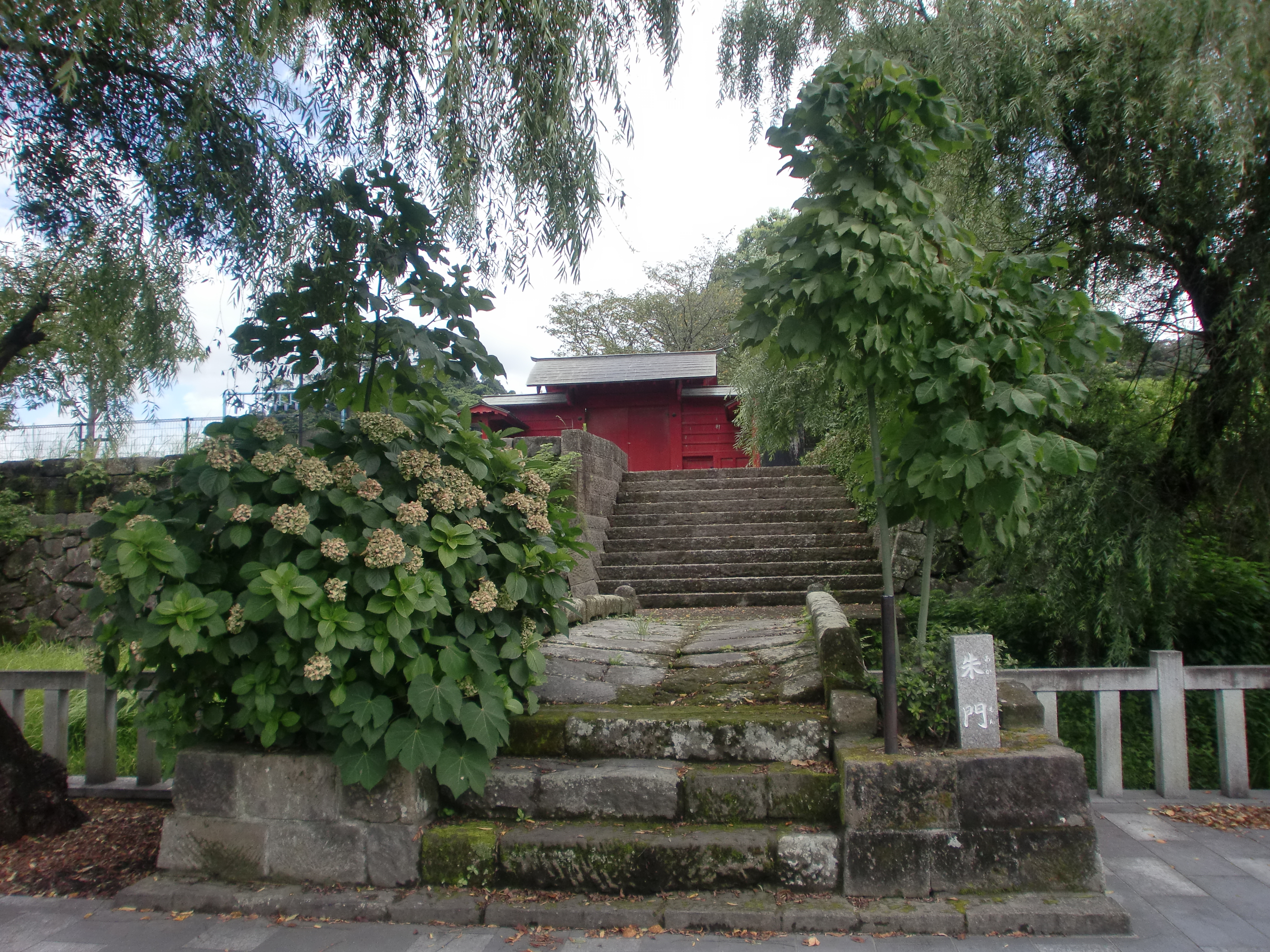
Akamon gate of Kokubu Castle
