= Shimazu Kameju =

Japanese noble woman

Jime-saa Shimazu Kameju
- 島津亀寿
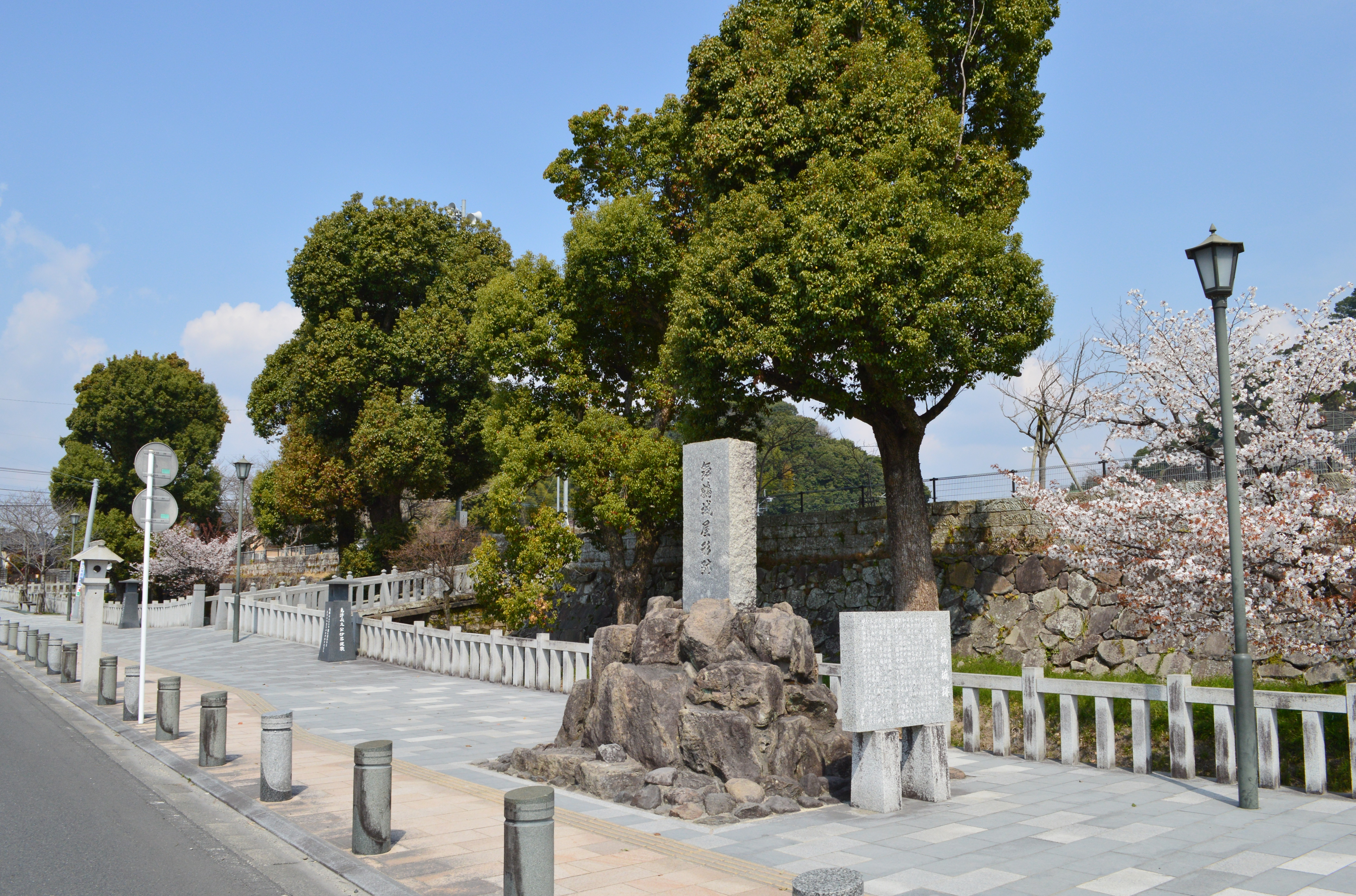
- Stone pillar where Kokubu Castle is located.

Castellan of Kokubu Castle
- In office 1611–1630

Personal life
- Born: 1571
- Died: 1630 (aged 58–59)
- Cause of death: natural causes
- Home town: Kagoshima
- Spouse: Shimazu Iehisa
- Parent: Shimazu Yoshihisa
- Occupation: Lady of Samurai family Bhikkhunī

Religious life
- Religion: Buddhism
- Dharma name: Jimyo-in

Military service
- Unit: Shimazu clan

Shimazu Kameju (島津亀寿, 1571 - 1630) or Kamejuhime (亀寿姫), was a Japanese noble woman from the Shimazu clan during the Sengoku period. She was the third daughter of Shimazu Yoshihisa, 16th head of the Shimazu clan, and wife to the 18th clan head, Shimazu Iehisa. Kameju is known as a beautiful and wise woman, it is said that she was very kind and loved by the people of Kagoshima. She played important roles as a diplomat when living under the Toyotomi clan, she later became castellan of Kokubu Castle.

It is said that visitors to Tsurugane Shrine will be blessed with her beauty, and each year a ceremony called Jimyo-sai is held where women gather to pray for health and beauty.

== Early life ==
Kameju was born in 1571 as the daughter of the powerful feudal lord, Shimazu Yoshihisa, who ruled much of the Satsuma area on the island of Kyushu.

Kameju's mother is the daughter of Tanegashima Tokitaka known for introducing firearms to Japan. Kameju's mother died when she was two years old, so she was raised by a nanny and a maid.

== First Marriage ==
Kameju Shimazu was the daughter of the head of the Shimazu family, when Toyotomi Hideyoshi conquers the island of Kyushu, the Shimazu family surrenders. Kameju, who was 17 at the time in 1587, went to Kyoto as a hostage. Kameju played the role of a hostage to show the loyalty of the Shimazu clan, who had fallen under the Toyotomi regime. She later returned to her homeland and married Shimazu Hisayasu, the son of Shimazu Yoshihiro.

As Yoshihisa did not have a son, he decided to make his successor his daughter's husband, Hisayasu was appointed as the next head of the Shimazu family, being the son-in-law of the current leader. The couple's relationship was reportedly good. However, in 1593, shortly after their marriage, Hisayasu died of illness at the age of 22 during the Bunroku War. Kameju was widowed at a young age after four years of marriage.

== Second Marriage ==
As Hisayasu, who was supposed to be the next family head, died of illness, Toyotomi Hideyoshi appointed Hisayasu's younger brother Shimazu Iehisa as the next head of the Shimazu clan. Thus, Kameju became Iehisa's lawful wife.

During the war with Korea, Iehisa participated by commanding 7,000 troops, he defeated 30,000 Ming troops, demonstrating his bravery. On the other hand, Kameju was once again taken hostage by the Toyotomi family. Upon arriving in the capital Osaka, she conveyed various information from Kyoto to the members of the Shimazu clan, and made a great contribution to transforming the clan, which was unaware of the situation in Kyoto, into one of the first clans with a complex system of diplomacy

It is believed that Shimazu Kameju's achievements are highly regarded by the Shimazu family. In 1599, Kameju was granted by Shimazu Yoshihiro (her uncle) landholdings of 5,000 koku in the Hioki District of Satsuma. The following year, she was granted by Shimazu Yoshihisa (her father) additional landholdings of 2,739 koku in the village of Ōnejime in Ōsumi Province.

=== Battle of Sekigahara ===
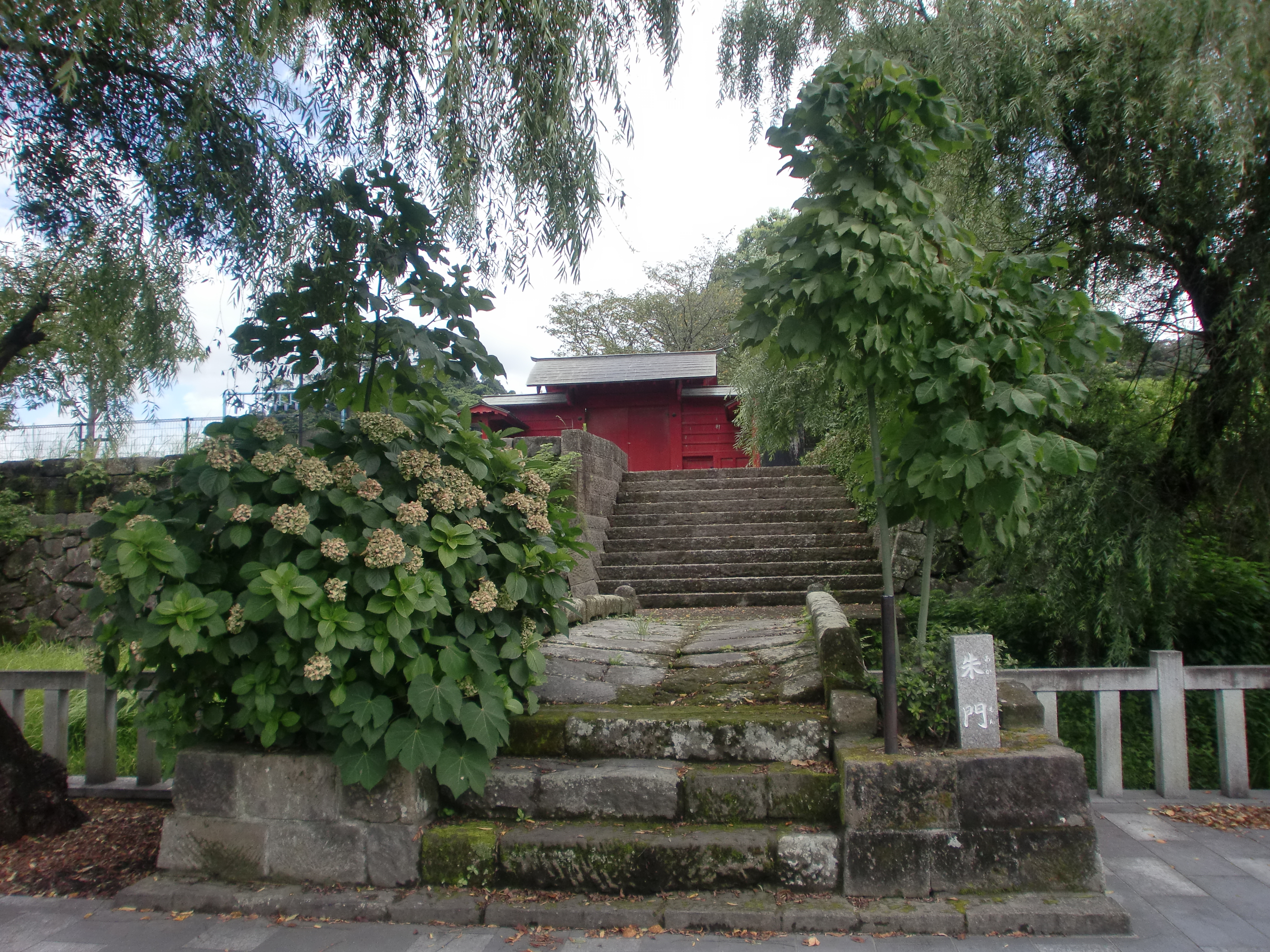
Kokubu Castle

After the death of Toyotomi Hideyoshi, a civil war broke out between supporters of Ishida Mitsunari and Tokugawa Ieyasu. This fight between the Western (Mitsunari's) and Eastern (Ieyasu's) armies became known as the Battle of Sekigahara. When the battle began, Kameju was held hostage in Osaka Castle by Mitsunari of the Western Army as a countermeasure against the defection of the Shimazu clan fearing that the Shimazu would ally with Ieyasu.

Mitsunari was killed and the Western army lost, so the Shimazu army managed to return from Sekigahara to Osaka. In the chaos after the battle ended, Shimazu Yoshihiro arrived at Osaka Castle. With the help of local merchants, Yoshihiro was able to free his wife Saisho and Shimazu Kameju, before the band of survivors returned home to Satsuma by boat..

=== Banished from Kagoshima ===
After the Battle of Sekigahara, the Shimazu clan lost much of its power and part of its land was divided. Kameju's father, Yoshihisa, who had sided with Mitsunari's army was punished, so Shimazu Iehisa saw it as an opportunity and apologized to Tokugawa Ieyasu in place of the leader of the Shimazu. After territorial settlement, Kameju's husband Tadatsune officially became the head of the Shimazu family, but Yoshihisa continued to wield great authority.

Although her husband became the head of the Shimazu family, their relationship was very bad and she had no children with him. As Shimazu Iehisa was married, he could not have a concubine. In order to get permission from Ieyasu Tokugawa to have a concubine, Iehisa asks to adopt the second son of Tokugawa Hidetada, the second shogun of the Tokugawa Shogunate.

In 1611, after the death of Shimazu Yoshihisa due to tensions between Shimazu Kameju and Shimazu Iehisa, Kameju was expelled from Kagoshima Castle, being deprived of the right to be a legal wife. Kameju went to live in Kokubun Castle and became a castellan. Then, as if to show off, Iehisa acquired eight consorts.

=== Nominating Successor ===
Kameju Shimazu was banished from Kagoshima Castle due to a conflict with her husband, but as the previous head of the family, Shimazu Yoshihisa, had no son, Kameju had the right to name a successor to the head of the family.

Kameju decided to adopt Shimazu Mitsuhisa, the second son of Shimazu Tadatsune and grandson of his older sister Ohira-kata, and named him as the clan's successor. Kameju's wish was granted and Shimazu Mitsuhisa reigned for a long time as head of the Shimazu family.

In 1624, she received another grant of 10,000 koku free of levies for her generation.

== Death ==
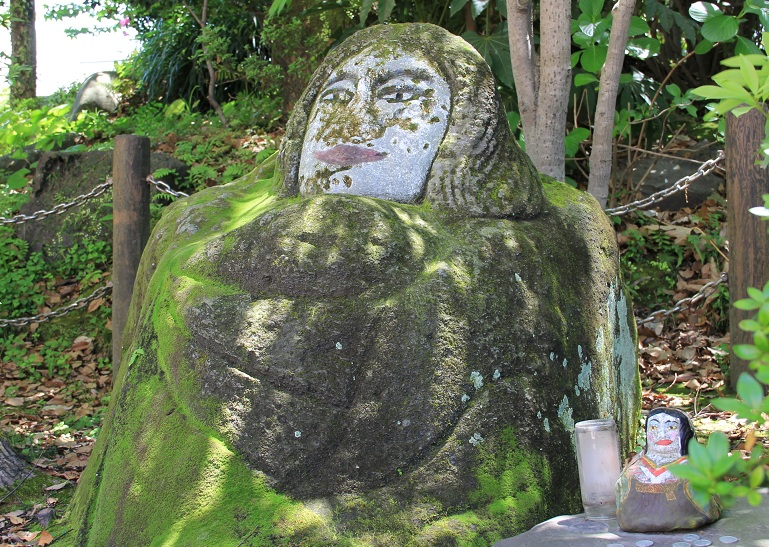
Statue representing Kameju. Every year on the date of Kameju's death, a group of women return to make up the stone.

In 1630, Kameju dies at Kokubun Castle. Kameju was worshiped in the Shimazu family, she received much of her ancestors' inheritance. Due to the fight with Iehisa, she preferred to give her inheritances to her servants and her adopted son. Kokubun Castle came under the direct control of the feudal lord, and a manor house was placed there.

Furthermore, there was a deep dislike for her husband, and it is said that her ex-husband, Iehisa, did not build a family shrine after Kameju's death and neglected the funeral service. Shimazu Iehisa sent a waka to her servants that is interpreted as: “In this transient world, Kameju died in the tenth month of the lunar calendar. I am not, however, weeping so much as to make my sleeves wet with tears.” However, there is also another interpretation of the waka that he was indeed crying to make his sleeve wet on the wish this was not the real world.

Mitsuhisa, who learned of this fact, built a family shrine for Kameju, buried his ashes in Koyasan, and ordered his vassals to visit the shrine without fail.

=== Legacy ===
In a secluded corner of the Kagoshima City Art Museum, nestled within the town of Shiroyama, Kagoshima, discreetly positioned behind a statue honoring Saigō Takamori, stands a stone figure known as Jimesā. This enigmatic statue, originally unearthed in 1929 on the former site of Kagoshima's municipal offices, is believed to represent Kameju, affectionately referred to as Jimesā in the Kagoshima dialect, derived from her posthumous name, Jimyōin.

A tradition unfolds each year on the anniversary of Kameju's passing, which falls on October 5. On this day, the statue is adorned with cosmetics, applied by the women of Kagoshima's municipal office. The makeup, featuring black and white poster paint, as well as lipstick and cheek rouge, reflects contemporary fashion trends and receives substantial media coverage. This enduring practice, dating back to 1929, serves as a tribute to the enduring memory of Kameju.

There exists a hypothesis that the statue referred to as Jimesā may not have originally been crafted in Kameju's likeness. In Kagoshima's Daijō Temple, affiliated with the Shingon sect, during the Edo period, a stone statue known as Shirochizō held significance. It was customary for visitors, including the Shimazu family, to apply face powder to this statue as part of their prayers. Remarkably, Shirochizō bore a resemblance to Jimesā. Following the Meiji period's movement to abolish Buddhism, which led to the closure of Daijō Temple, the statue found its new home at the current location of Jimesā. This intriguing connection between Shirochizō and Kameju established the Daijō Temple as an institution with a profound affinity for Kameju.

== See also ==
- List of female castellans in Japan

== Sources ==
- 田端泰子『女人政治の中世』講談社、1996年。
