= Battle of Mimigawa =

1578 battle of Japan's Sengoku period

- Part of Sengoku period
Date	10 December, 1578
Location	Mimi river, Hyūga Province, southern Kyushu, 32°09′58″N 131°28′50″E
Result	Shimazu clan victory

Belligerents
Shimazu clan	Ōtomo clan

Commanders and leaders
Shimazu Yoshihisa; Shimazu Yoshihiro; Shimazu Toshihisa; Shimazu Iehisa; Shimazu Tadahira; Shimazu Tadamune; Yamada Arinobu; Uwai Kakuken; Ei Hisatora	Ōtomo Sōrin; Ōtomo Yoshimune; Tawara Chikataka; Takita Shigekane †; Saeki Korenori †; Yoshioka Akioki †; Tsunokuma Sekiso †; Kamachi Akimori †; Kutami Akiyasu

Strength
30,000	50,000
- Location within Miyazaki Prefecture Battle of Mimigawa (Japan)

The Battle of Mimigawa was fought in Japan between the Ōtomo clan and the Shimazu clan in 1578. The Ōtomo force was led by Sorin's brother-in-law Tawara Chikataka, while the Shimazu clan was led by Shimazu Yoshihisa.

== Prelude ==
In May 1578, the Shimazu had been advancing north from their Satsuma Province to confront the Ōtomo clan, when Ōtomo Sōrin (retired daimyō) and his heir Yoshimune, moved south to attack Takajo castle. The Christian Ōtomo army destroyed Buddhist and Shinto religious buildings along the way. Later, The Ōtomo crossed the Mimigawa and laid siege to Takajo Castle on 20 October, The Takajo garrison only have 500 men led by Yamada Arinobu. The Ōtomo set up their Portuguese cannon, kunikuzuri or "destroyer of provinces", across the Kiribaragawa. The castle was soon reinforced by 1000 men under Yoshihisa's younger brother, Shimazu Iehisa.

Shimazu Yoshihisa had a dream the night before the battle, which he turned into a poem, and the Shimazu considered a good omen:

The enemy defeated host

Is as the maple leaves of autumn,

Floating on the water

Of the Takuta stream

== Battle ==
The Shimazu used their favorite decoy tactic, used 8 times from 1527 to 1600. In the center of their army as decoy was Shimazu Yoshihiro, with Shimazu Tadahira and Shimazu Tadamune on his flanks, and Shimazu Yoshihisa in reserve.

The Ōtomo army in the center, led by Takita Shigekane and Saeki Korenori, were led on by the Shimazu Yoshihiro false retreat, across the Takajogawa, into the Shimazu Toshihisa trap. In the mean time, Shimazu Iehisa and Yamada Arinobu sallied from Takajo castle and attacked the Otomo army from the rear.

Shimazu Toshihisa was able to ambush some Ōtomo troops and pursuit the survivors to their headquarters at Matsuyama castle.

Otomo's general, Tawara Chikataka fled while Takita Shigekane, Saeki Karenori, Yoshioka Akioki, Tsunokuma Sekiso and Kamachi Akimori were killed in battle. The bodies of the Otomo army littered the 25 km back to the Mimigawa in their retreat and pursuit by the Shimazu army.

According to Fabian Fucan, Shimazu used the battle to warn other daimyōs not to abandon the Buddhist religion.

== See also ==
- Battle of Takajō

== External link ==
- Shiroyama Park (Takajō Castle Ruins), Takajō River Battlefield, Nejirozaka Battlefield Site / Kijo Town
