= Sagara Yoshihi =

Japanese daimyō

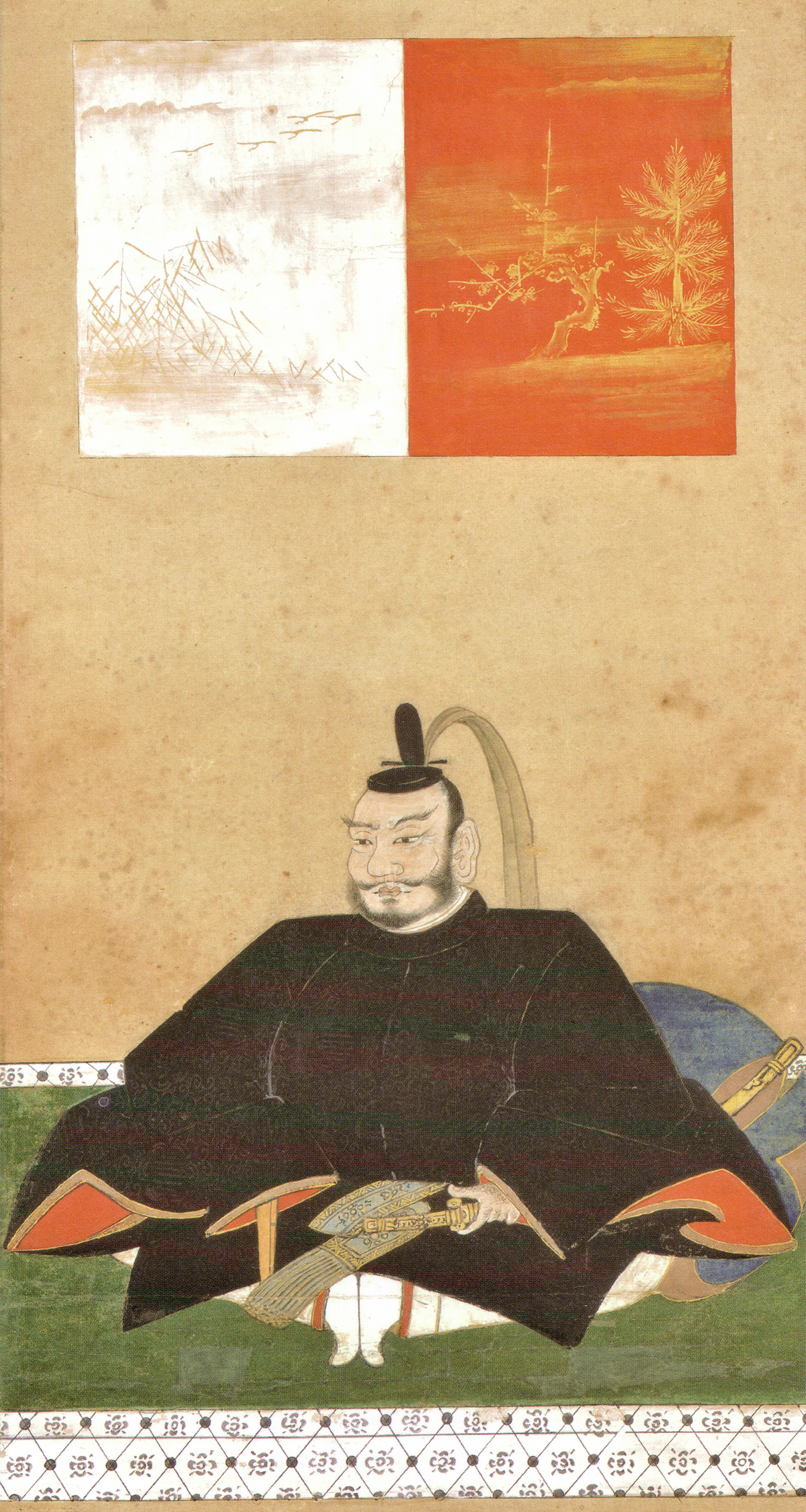
Sagara Yoshihi

Sagara Yoshihi (相良義陽) (1544–1581) was a Japanese daimyō of the Sengoku period, who ruled a region in southern Higo Province.

In the Siege of Minamata Castle, Sagara Yoshihi was guarded the Castle with 700 soldiers, it was a short siege of the castle of Minamata. Minamata was the entry point for the Ōtomo lands in Higo province. When Shimazu Iehisa encamped near the castle with 115,000 men, Yoshihi was forced to surrender.

Later, Yoshihi was killed in a surprise attack by Kai Sound's army in the Battle of Hibikinohara.

Yoshihi descendants were eventually confirmed in Hitoyoshi Domain, and remained daimyō until the Meiji Restoration.
