= Itō Yoshisuke =

Japanese daimyō (1512–1585)

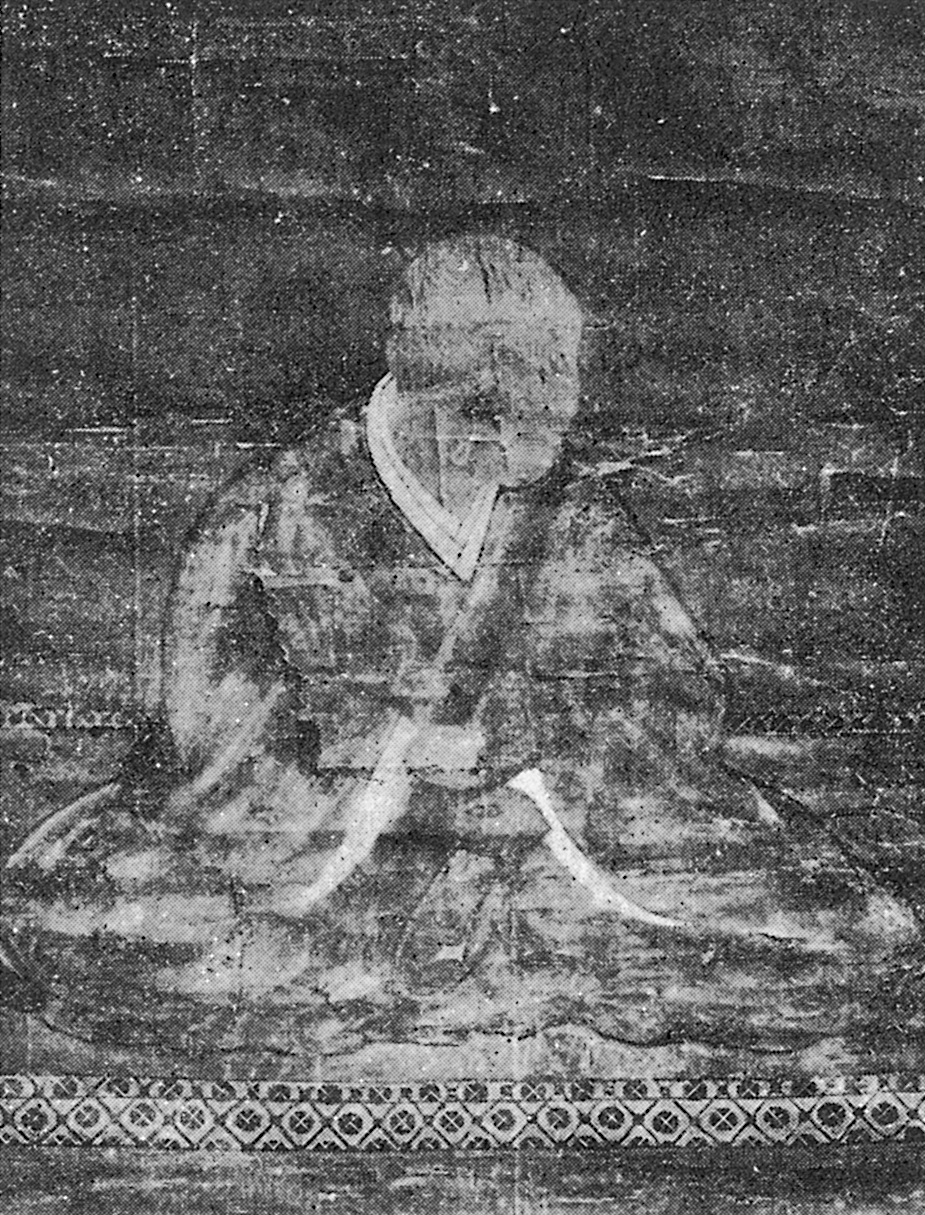
Itō Yoshisuke

Itō Yoshisuke (伊東 義祐, 1512 – August 29, 1585) was a Japanese daimyō of the Sengoku period. In his lifetime, he was the head of the Itō clan.

In 1538, he became the head of the Itō clan. In 1542, he restored his old territory occupied by the Shimazu clan. He was defeated by Shimazu Yoshihiro in the 1572 Battle of Kizaki. Yoshisuke capitulated to the advancing Shimazu clan in 1576 and sought refuge with the Otomo clan. then he defeated by Shimazu Yoshihisa in Siege of Takabaru.

Yoshisuke, who was the descendant of Itō Suketsune. He inherited Agata Domain in Hyūga Province in 1584.
