= Shimazu Tadahisa =

Founder of the Shimazu samurai clan (1179–1227)

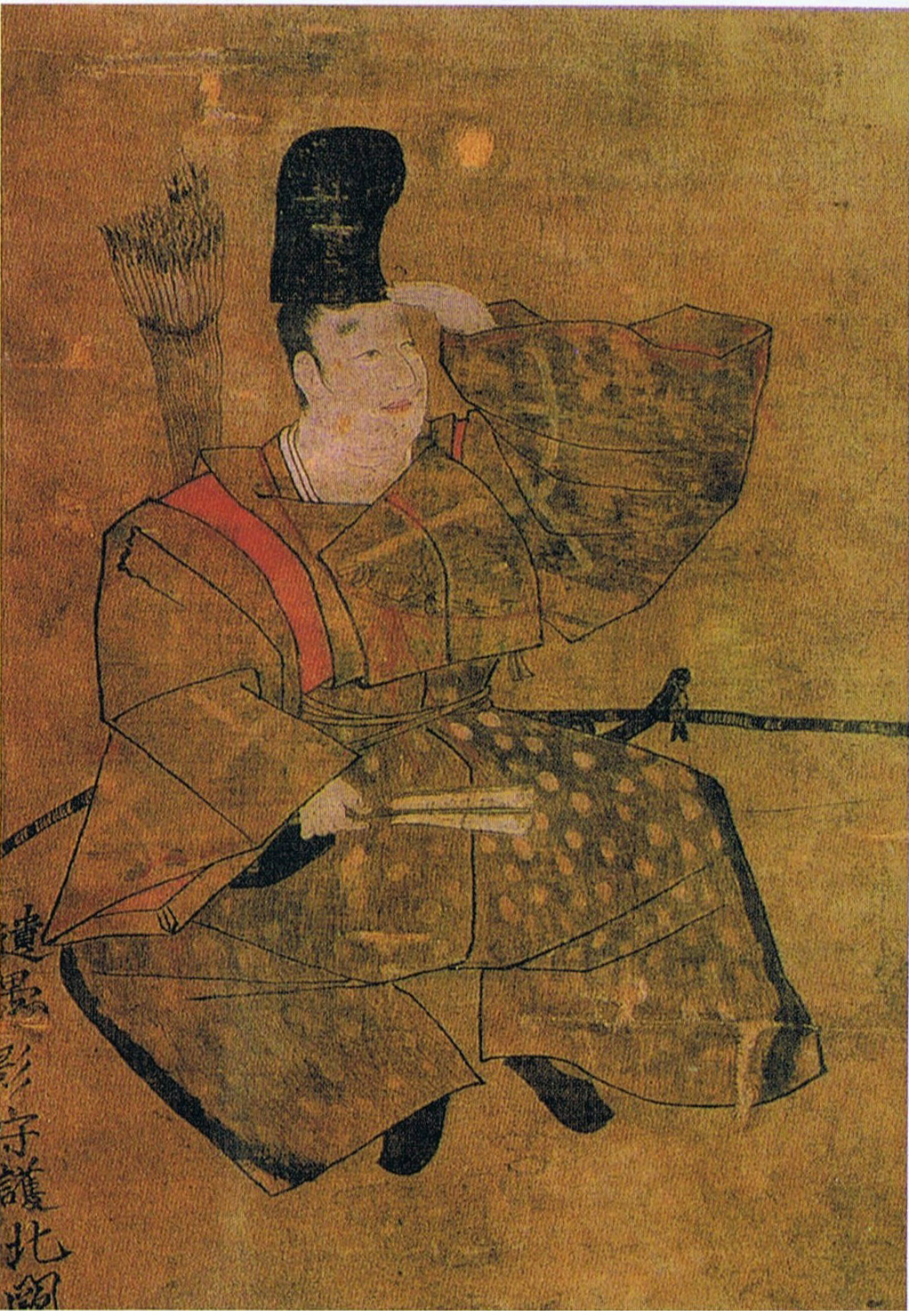

Shimazu Tadahisa (島津 忠久; 1179 – 1227) was the founder of the Shimazu samurai clan.

== Life ==
Tadahisa was a son of the Shōgun Minamoto no Yoritomo (1147–1199) by the sister of Hiki Yoshikazu.

According to a record of his life, he was reportedly born in Sumiyoshi Taisha in Osaka. He was initially Koremune no Tadahisa (惟宗忠久) but after being given the position of jitō (land steward) of the Shimazu Estate by Minamoto no Yoritomo, he took the name of Shimazu.

He received the domain of Shioda (Shinano province) in 1186 and was then named Shugo of Satsuma province. He sent Honda Sadachika to take possession of the province in his name and accompanied Yoritomo in his expedition to Mutsu in 1189.

He went to Satsuma in 1196, subdued Hyūga and Ōsumi provinces, and built a castle in the domain of Shimazu (Hyūga) which name he also adopted. He died in 1227 and was buried in Kamakura, near his father's tomb. His descendants ran the Shimazu clan (named after him) for hundreds of years.
