= Siege of Takabaru =

- Part of Sengoku period
Date	October, 1576
Location	Takabaru Castle, Hyūga Province, Kyushu 31°56′08″N 131°00′37″E
Result	Shimazu victory

Belligerents
Shimazu clan	Itō clan

Commanders and leaders
Shimazu Yoshihisa; Shimazu Yoshihiro; Shimazu Toshihisa; Yamada Arinobu	Itō Yoshisuke

Strength
6,000	
- Location within Miyazaki Prefecture Siege of Takabaru (Japan)

The siege of Takabaru occurred in October 1576 when the forces of Shimazu Yoshihisa besieged and took the Takabaru Castle, which belonged to the Itō clan.

The Shimazu family had by the 1570s started its rise as the dominant power in Kyūshū and continued its expansion in Hyūga Province at the expense of Itō clan.
