= Siege of Minamata Castle =

- Part of Sengoku period
Date	16–17 September 1581
Location	Minamata castle, Higo Province 32°13′00″N 130°24′00″E
Result	Shimazu victory

Belligerents
Shimazu clan	Ōtomo clan Sagara clan

Commanders and leaders
Shimazu Toshihisa; Shimazu Iehisa; Niiro Tadamoto; Uwai Kakuken	Sagara Yoshihi (surrendered)

Strength
115,000	700
- Location within Kumamoto Prefecture Siege of Minamata Castle (Japan)

The siege of Minamata Castle was a short siege of the castle of Minamata.

Minamata was the entry point for the Ōtomo lands in Higo province, the castle was guarded by Sagara Yoshihi with 700 soldiers.

When Shimazu Toshihisa and Iehisa encamped near the castle with 115,000 men, Yoshihi was forced to surrender.

Later, Yoshihi was killed in a surprise attack by Kai Soun's army in the Battle of Hibikinohara.
