= Battle of Okitanawate =

1584 battle in Sengoku Japan

- Part of Sengoku period
Date	May 3, 1584
Location	Near Shimabara, Hizen Province 32°48′09″N 130°21′52″E
Result	Allied victory
Territorial changes	Urakami ceded to the Society of Jesus

Belligerents
Shimazu clan Arima clan Portugal	Ryūzōji clan

Commanders and leaders
Arima Harunobu; Shimazu Iehisa; Shimazu Toyohisa; Niiro Tadamoto; Gaspar Coelho	Ryūzōji Takanobu †; Nabeshima Naoshige

Strength
6,300–9,000; 1 warship (under Ambrosio Fernandes)	25,000–50,000

Casualties and losses
Unknown	10,000 dead
- Location within Nagasaki Prefecture Battle of Okitanawate (Japan)

The Battle of Okitanawate (沖田畷の戦い), also known as the Battle of Shimabara, was fought on May 3 of 1584, the Arima–Shimazu alliance defeated the Ryūzōji with Portuguese military support, including firearms, mortars, and a Portuguese fusta commanded by Captain Ambrósio Fernandes. The intervention was organised locally through the Jesuit mission and Portuguese merchants.

Ryūzōji Takanobu was attacking a number of independent clans close to his territories. In 1582 he attacked the Arima clan and Arima Harunobu decided to ask the help of Shimazu Yoshihisa. Yoshihisa sent an army in December of that year but not much progress was made until 1584. When the army was reorganized and commanded by the able Shimazu Iehisa, younger brother of Yoshihisa, the allies put Shimabara under siege and Takanobu marched to relieve the castle with his main army.

On May 3 the Shimazu-Arima army entrenched on a hill in front of Shimabara and received the attack of the Ryūzōji who were well armed with muskets, including high calibre ones. They attacked the hill in three columns, one advancing along the road, another advancing along the hills and a third along the beach.

They were harassed by the Arima with large caliber arquebuses mounted on boats. The columns were defeated when the Shimazu enticed the Ryūzōji into a false retreat, Harunobu attacked the enemy's main force, and Shimazu retainer, Kawakami Tadakata, allowing a flying column of samurai to take Ryūzōji Takanobu's head.

Harunobu considered his victory to be the work of God. Out of gratitude, he ceded the town of Urakami to the Society of Jesus. In this way, the Jesuits gained administrative control of the area, and consequently, Urakami became a Christian town.
