= Shimazu Hisatsune =

Samurai and the third head of the Shimazu clan (1225 – 1284)

Shimazu Hisatsune (島津 久経; 1225 – 1284) (otherwise known as Hisachika) was a mid-Kamakura period samurai and the third head of the Shimazu clan. He served as a Kamakura shogunate gokenin and succeeded his father Shimazu Tadatoshi as clan head.

During the Mongol invasions of Japan, Hisatsune defended Hakata Bay alongside Shōni Kagesuke during the Battle of Kōan. He died in 1284.

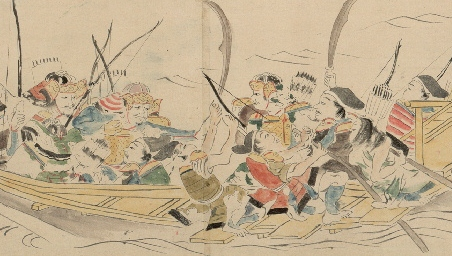
Shimazu Hisatsune's troops, Mōko Shūrai Ekotoba
