= Shimazu Yoshihisa =

Japanese feudal lord of Satsuma Province

- 島津 義久
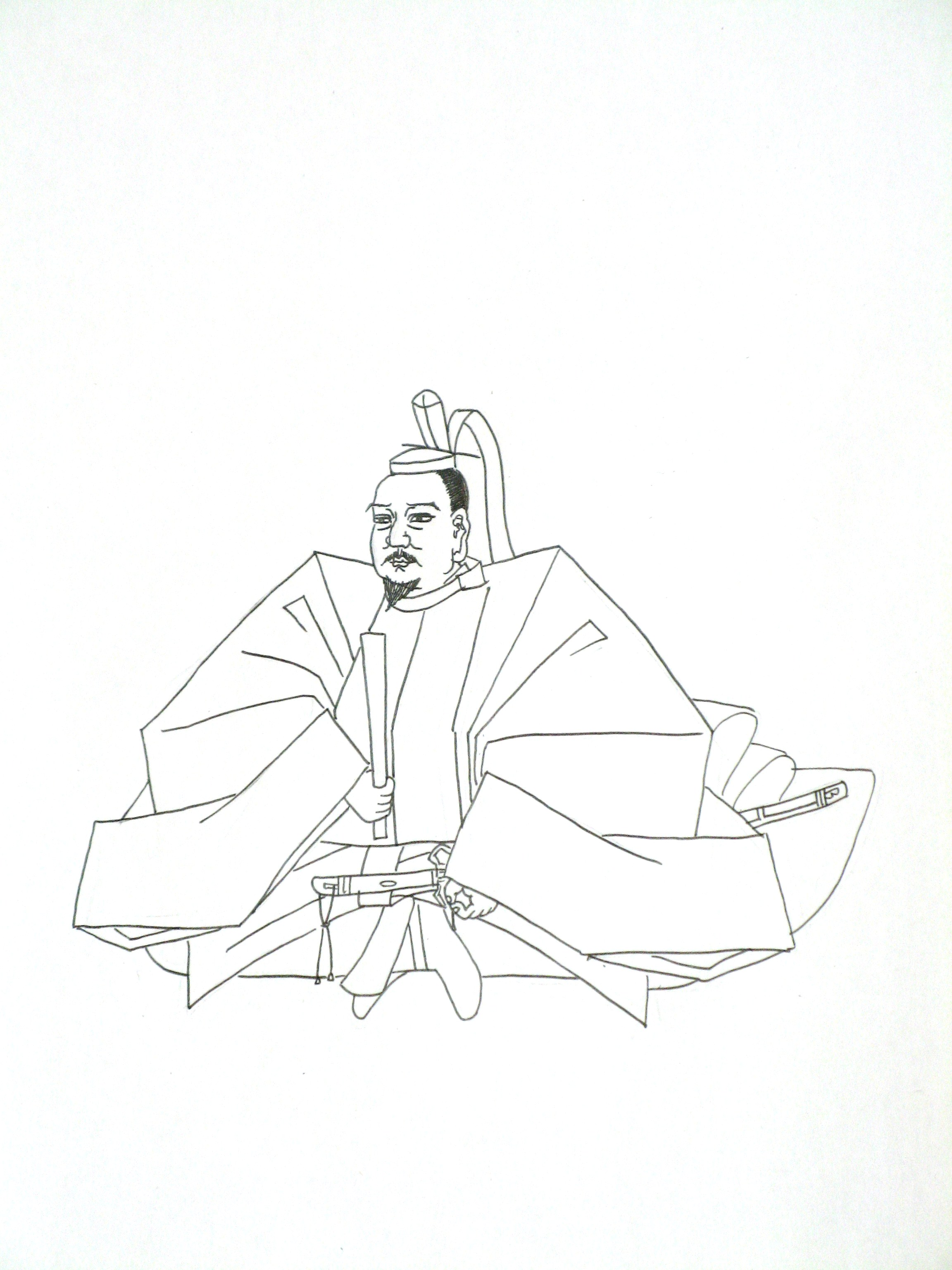

Head of Shimazu clan
- In office 1566–1587
- Preceded by: Shimazu Takahisa
- Succeeded by: Shimazu Yoshihiro

Personal details
- Born: February 9, 1533 Izaku Castle
- Died: March 5, 1611 (aged 78) Kokubu Castle, Kagoshima
- Parents: Shimazu Takahisa (father); Sesshō (mother)
- Relatives: Shimazu Yoshihiro (brother); Shimazu Toshihisa (brother); Shimazu Iehisa (half-brother)

Military service
- Allegiance: Shimazu clan Toyotomi clan
- Rank: Daimyo
- Unit: Shimazu clan
- Commands: Kagoshima
- Battles/wars: Siege of Takabaru (1576); Battle of Mimigawa (1578); Siege of Iwaya Castle (1585); Siege of Tachibana (1586); Kyushu Campaign (1586-1587)

Shimazu Yoshihisa (島津義久; February 9, 1533 – March 5, 1611) was a powerful daimyō and the 16th Chief of Shimazu clan of Satsuma Province, the eldest son of Shimazu Takahisa. He was renowned as a great general, who managed to subjugate Kyushu through the deft maneuvering of his three brothers. Eventually, in 1585, Yoshihisa seceded control of the entire Kyushu region.

== Early life and rise ==
His mother was a daughter of Iriki'in Shigesato (入来院重聡), Sesshō (雪窓). Shimazu Yoshihiro, Shimazu Toshihisa and Shimazu Iehisa were his brothers. He is said to have been born in Izaku Castle in 1535. His childhood name was Torajumaru (虎寿丸) but he went by the name of Matasaburō (又三郎). On his coming-of-age (genpuku), he took the name of Tadayoshi(忠良) but after receiving a kanji from the shōgun Ashikaga Yoshiteru, changed to Yoshitatsu (義辰). He later changed his name to Yoshihisa. He married his own aunt and after her death, married his relative, a daughter of Tanegashima Tokitaka.

In 1566, he succeeded his father as the head of Shimazu clan, becoming the clan's sixteenth leader.

== Unification of Kyushu ==
Working together with his brothers Yoshihiro, Toshihisa, and Iehisa, he launched a campaign to unify Kyūshū.

Starting in 1572 with a victory against Itō clan at the battle of Kizaki and the Siege of Takabaru in 1576, Yoshihisa continued to win battles.

In 1578, Yoshihisa defeated the Ōtomo clan at the battle of Mimigawa and pursuit the Ōtomo army to they homeland, though he did not take their territory;

Later, in 1581, Yoshihisa forces took Minamata castle in Higo Province with a force of 115,000 men;

In early 1584, his forces was victorious in Battle of Okitanawate In Hizen Province against Ryūzōji clan and defeated the Aso clan.

In 1585, Yoshihisa forces attack Horikiri Castle at Chikugo Province and later took Otomo's Iwaya castle resulted after the Shimazu invasion of Chikuzen Province.

By the middle of 1585, the Shimazu clan controlled; Chikugo, Chikuzen, Hizen, Higo, Hyūga, Osumi, and Satsuma, most of Kyūshū with the exception of Ōtomo's domain and unification was a feasible goal.

== Conflict with Hideyoshi ==
In 1585, during Shimazu's attempt to unify Kyushu, other Kyushu clans appealed to Toyotomi Hideyoshi for help; the Otomo clan and Ryuzoji clan asked Hideyoshi for aid, and though he had been unable to help at that time, Hideyoshi interceded, requesting that Yoshihisa make peace with Otomo. In response, Yoshihisa derided his attempt to intervene, not seeing Hideyoshi as being in a position to invade Kyushu.

In 1586, Shimazu Yoshihisa marched to attack Otomo's Tachibana castle, when the commanders of the Shimazu army arrived near Tachibana castle. Tachibana Muneshige led the defense of the castle with his wife, the former clan leader Tachibana Ginchiyo. Later, the Otomo leaders travelled to Osaka itself, seeking to persuade Hideyoshi to help. Hideyoshi was impressed with this embassy, and presumably agreed to help. Yoshihisa, seeing that Hideyoshi was prepared to invade, sent a message to Hideyoshi, claiming that he had attacked the other clans in self-defence, but Hideyoshi refused and leads his forces to Kyushu.

=== Kyushu campaign ===
In late 1586, Kyushu Campaign by Toyotomi Hideyoshi begin. The Ōtomo forces, were supported by Shikoku armies under Chōsokabe Motochika, Sengoku Hidehisa and Sogō Masayasu, they delayed Shimazu forces and weakened them in preparation for the arrival of Hideyoshi's armies. Hideyoshi mobilised a force of 200,000 soldiers and 20,000 pack animals, transporting supplies for an even larger army of 300,000 men. Toyotomi Hidenaga led the vanguard of 25,000 men and 3,000 horses.

By April 1587 Hideyoshi had reached the straits at Shimonoseki, moving through Chikuzen and Chikugo to attack Yoshihisa in Higo. At this point Mōri forces under Kobayakawa Takakage joined Hidenaga's force, as the Mōri had been recently suppressed. Hidenaga then drove back the Shimazu forces in Hyūga and Bungo. The Shimazu fought well, but had few firearms and lacked discipline and training; they were steadily overwhelmed through the superior quality and quantity.

By the end of May 1587, the various island daimyos had turned to Hideyoshi's side. In June, Shimazu was routed in Satsuma itself, and Hideyoshi laid Siege of Kagoshima castle. Yoshihisa sued for peace, and a truce was agreed. Hideyoshi offered generous terms for a lasting peace to son of Yoshihiro's and Iehisa's; though Yoshihisa initially refused the offer, Hideyoshi tried again and was this time successful.

== After surrender ==
Most of the domains Yoshihisa had conquered were given by Hideyoshi to three of his senior generals - Kato, Konishi, and Kuroda - and the Shimazu clan managed to retain only Satsuma Province and Ōsumi Province, as well as half of Hyuga. The Mori were given fiefs in northern Kyushu, and Kobayakawa gained Chikuzen. Yoshihisa shaved his head to surrender, showing that he would become a Buddhist monk if his life was spared. His name as a monk was Ryūhaku (龍伯) but it is unclear whether he retired in order to allow Yoshihiro to rule. As a retainer under Hideyoshi, his younger brother Yoshihiro controlled troops, but it is believed that Yoshihisa still managed day-to-day affairs in the domain. Yoshihisa did not have a son to succeed him, so he had Yoshihiro's son, Shimazu Tadatsune marry the third daughter Shimazu Kameju (亀寿) and adopted him as the successor.

Yoshihisa's knowledge of culture is not known, but after Hideyoshi granted Hosokawa Fujitaka a retirement estate at Osumi Province in 1595, Fujitaka taught him classic literatures, and Kampaku Konoe Wakihisa, who was skilled in waka and renga, is believed to have frequented Yoshihisa's house. He initially looked favourably on Christian missionaries such as Luís de Almeida.

After his domain was split up by Hideyoshi, Tokugawa Ieyasu invited Yoshihisa to Fushimi Castle. Ieyasu and his retainers repeatedly asked Yoshihisa how he managed to unify Kyushu; eventually, Yoshihisa relented, saying that he won his victories through his retainers - "[Because] my three younger brothers, led by Yoshihiro, as well as retainers like Uwai Satokane and Yamada Arinobu, fought so well united under the same goal, I never had a chance to show my bravery in a battle. I only had to wait in the castle for news brought by messengers of their victories". After Yoshihisa left, Ieyasu told his retainers that - "[Yoshihisa had, as] a general let retainers under him work to the best of their abilities. This is how a great general should be".

== Death ==
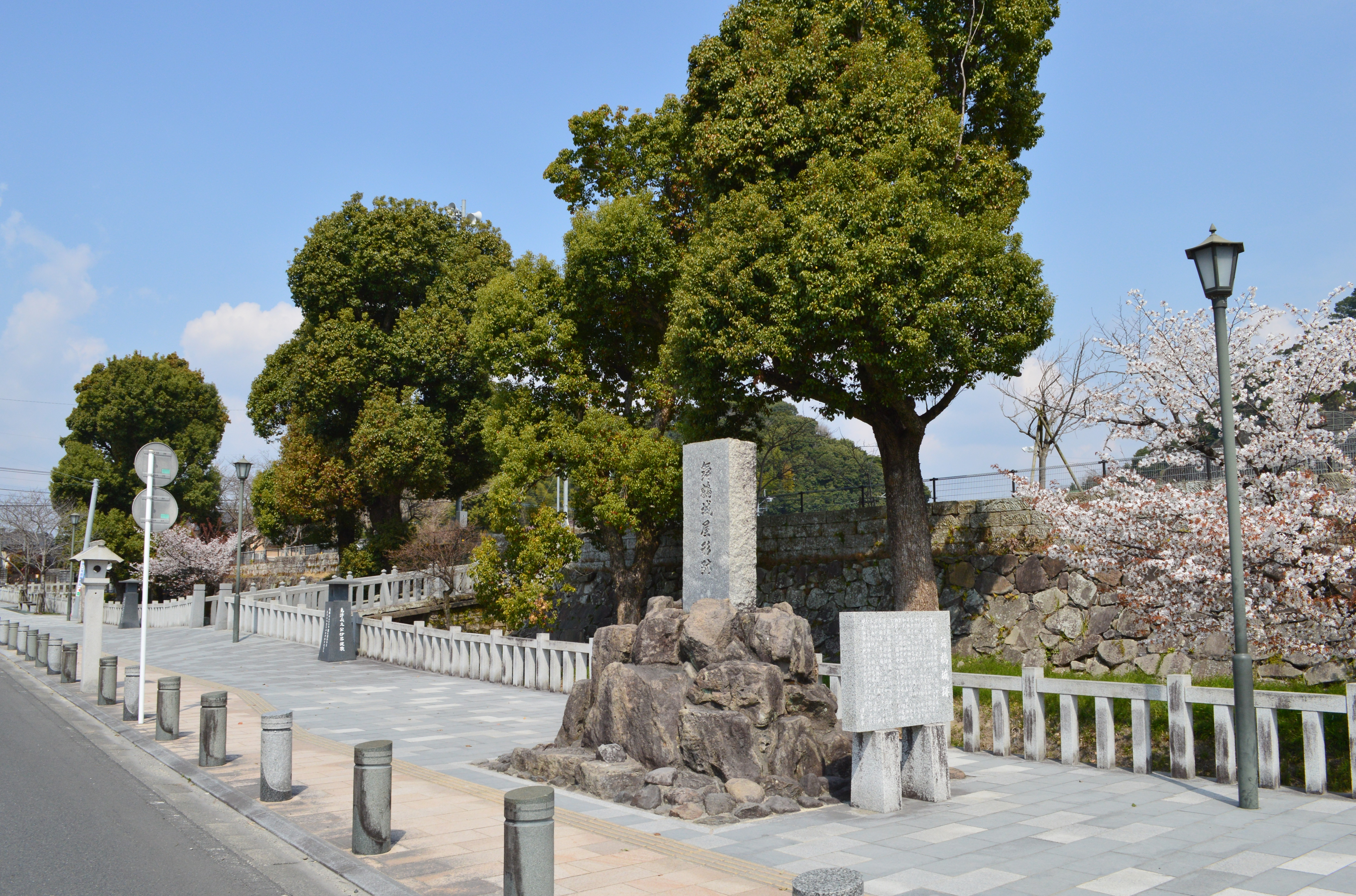
Water moat and stone wall of Kokubu Castle

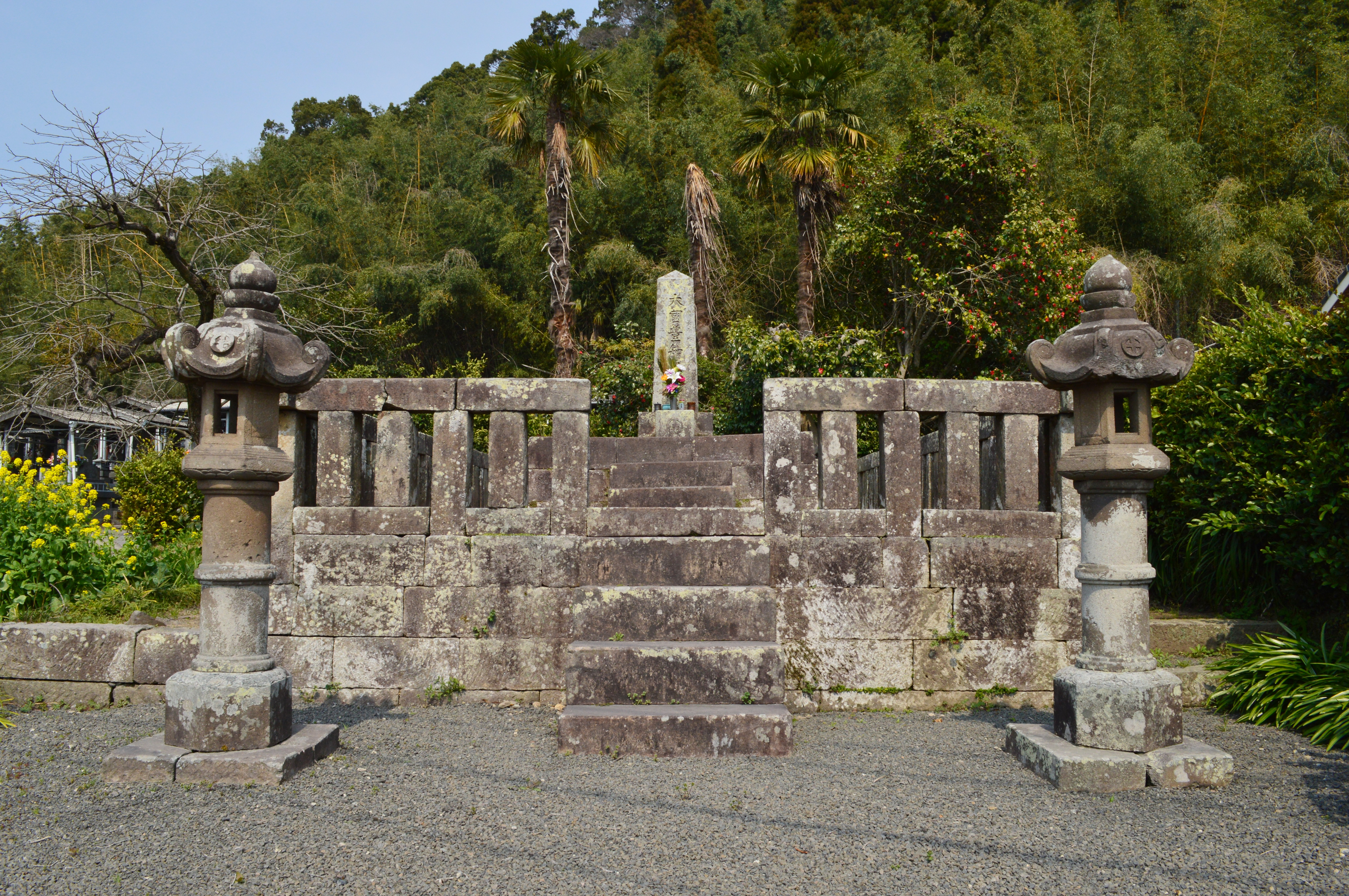
Tomb of Shimazu Yoshihisa in Tokuji-Temple

On January 21, 1611, he died of illness in Kokubu Castle. Posthumously, he was named 貫明存忠庵主. He was buried at what had once been the site of Fukushoji in Kagoshima - his tombstone remains, along with those of the other leaders of his clan. There are also monuments built in his memory at Kokubun, Ima Kumano Kannonji (今熊野観音寺) in Kyoto, and Koyasan. Though there is no portrait of Yoshihisa remaining, there is a bronze figure of Yoshihisa at the Taiheiji, depicting his surrender to Hideyoshi. The statue was produced after he died.

== Notable retainers ==
=== Shimazu clan ===
- Shimazu Yoshihiro
- Shimazu Toshihisa
- Shimazu Iehisa
- Shimazu Tadanaga

=== Other ===
- Niiro Tadamoto
- Yamada Arinobu
- Uwai Satokane
- Ei Hisatora
- Ijūin Tadamune
- Hongo Tokihisa
- Hongo Tadatora
