= Shimazu Toshihisa =

Japanese General (1537-1592)

- 島津 歳久

Personal details
- Born: August 15, 1537 Izaku Castle
- Died: August 25, 1592 (aged 55) Ryugamizu, Kagoshima
- Relations: Shimazu Takahisa (father); Shimazu Yoshihisa (brother); Shimazu Yoshihiro (brother); Shimazu Iehisa (brother)

Military service
- Allegiance: Shimazu clan
- Unit: Shimazu clan
- Battles/wars: Siege of Takabaru (1576); Battle of Mimigawa (1578); Siege of Minamata (1581); Siege of Iwaya Castle (1585); Kyūshū campaign (1587)

Shimazu Toshihisa (島津 歳久; August 15, 1537 – August 25, 1592) was a Japanese samurai of the Azuchi-Momoyama period, He called 'Saemon no kami'. he was a third son of Shimazu Takahisa, who served as a general officer and senior retainer of the Shimazu clan of Satsuma Province.

Toshihisa was known as a rare "Resourceful General", He was in a key position to determine the policies of Shimazu's army as a general officer responsible for war strategies. He was fought in the Siege of Takabaru (1576), Battle of Mimigawa (1578), Siege of Minamata Castle (1581) during Shimazu clan campaign to conquer Kyūshū and also the commander of Shimazu clan against Toyotomi Hideyoshi, when Hideyoshi invaded Kyushu (1587). He didn't surrender to Hideyoshi and kept on fighting even after his brother Yoshihisa surrendered.

Later in 1592, at the time of uprising against Hideyoshi, the incident at Taihei-ji Temple was raised as an issue; this led Hideyoshi to issue an order to track down and kill Toshihisa which made him commit suicide by seppuku at Ryugamizu. After his death, a legitimate son of his adopted son, Shimazu Tadachika, Tsunehisa, inherited his position.
