= Uwai Kakuken =

Japanese samurai

- Born: 1545
- Died: 1589 (aged 43–44); Ijūin, Kagoshima
- Military career
- Allegiance: Shimazu clan
- Rank: Karō
- Nickname: Satokane
- Commands: Miyazaki castle
- Conflicts: Battle of Meguri (1561); Battle of Mimigawa (1578); Hyuga campaign (1579); Siege of Minamata (1581); Siege of Iwatsurugi (1586); Kyūshū campaign (1587)

Uwai Kakuken (上井覚兼) (1545–1589) also known as Satokane was a Japanese samurai of the Sengoku period, who served the Shimazu clan. Uwai Kakuken was a Shimazu clan chief retainer and one of Shimazu Yoshihisa's top councilors. Parts of his diary survives as a glimpse into the court of a 16th Century daimyō.

In 1561, Kakuken had his first military engagement in the Battle of Meguri Castle. He was named Chief retainer in 1576, and following the 1579 conquest of Hyūga Province by the Shimazu, was given Miyazaki castle. Kakuken was active in campaigns in Higo Province and against the Ōtomo clan. He was also active in appreciation of waka poetry and tea ceremony, and is known to have been a highly educated and cultured individual.

Kakuken suffered a serious injury in the 1586 Siege of Iwatsurugi castle. The following year, he was attacked and defeated at Miyazaki, Kagoshima prefecture by the forces of Toyotomi Hideyoshi. He submitted to Hideyoshi's authority, turned over the castle to him, and took up retirement at Ijūin in Satsuma province. Kakuken died several years later, in 1589.
