= Shimazu Iehisa =

Japanese samurai (1547–1587)

- 島津 家久

Lord of Sadowara Castle
- In office 1579–1587
- Preceded by: Itō Yoshisuke
- Succeeded by: Shimazu Toyohisa

Personal details
- Born: 1547 Izaku Castle
- Died: 1587 (aged 39-40)
- Children: Shimazu Toyohisa; Shimazu Tadanao; Shimazu Mitsuhisa
- Parent: Shimazu Takahisa (father)
- Relatives: Shimazu Yoshihisa (brother); Shimazu Toshihisa (brother); Shimazu Yoshihiro (brother)

Military service
- Allegiance: Shimazu clan
- Unit: Shimazu clan
- Battles/wars: Battle of Mimigawa (1578); Siege of Minamata (1581); Battle of Okitanawate (1584); Siege of Tachibana (1586); Kyūshū campaign (1586-1587)

Shimazu Iehisa (島津 家久; 1547 – July 10, 1587) was a Japanese samurai of the Sengoku period, who was a member of the Shimazu clan of Satsuma Province. He was the fourth son of Shimazu Takahisa. He served in a command capacity during his family's campaign to conquer Kyūshū.

His sons were Shimazu Toyohisa, Shimazu Tadanao, and Shimazu Mitsuhisa. He was nephew of 'Ten'ei-in' (wife of Tokugawa Ienobu) from his mother side and later he married Kamehime and daughter of Shimazu Yoshitaka, Mitsuhime.

He participated in the Siege of Oguchi Castle (1569), Battle of Mimigawa (1578), Siege of Minamata Castle (1582) and Battle of Okitanawate (1584). In 1587 he fought against Toyotomi Hideyoshi forces at the Battle of Hetsugigawa and Battle of Takajō.

In 1587, he suddenly died at Sadowara Castle. There is a theory that he was poisoned when he visited Toyotomi Hidenaga's camp.
