= Shimazu Yoshihiro =

Samurai of the Sengoku period

Senior Third Rank Shimazu Yoshihiro
- 島津 義弘
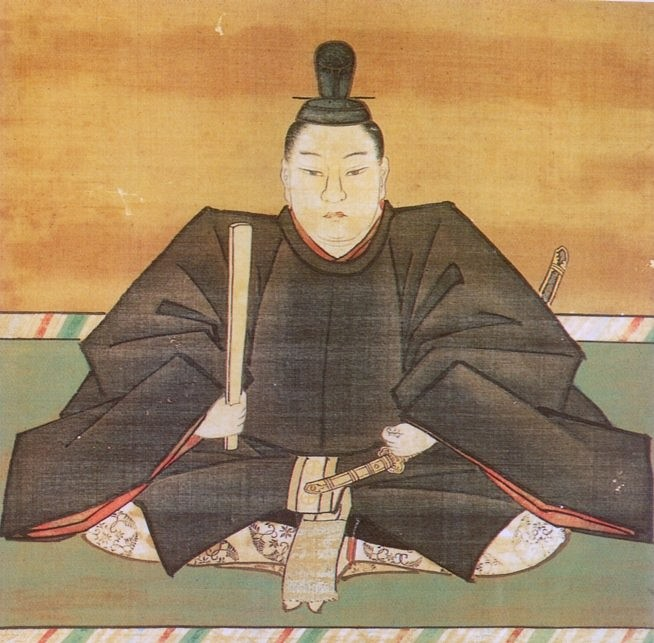

Head of Shimazu clan
- In office 1587–1602
- Preceded by: Shimazu Yoshihisa
- Succeeded by: Shimazu Tadatsune

Personal details
- Born: August 21, 1535 Izaku Castle, Satsuma Province
- Died: August 30, 1619 (aged 84) Kajiki Castle, Satsuma Province
- Spouse(s): Hongō Tadataka's daughter Saishō-dono
- Relations: Shimazu Yoshihisa (brother); Shimazu Toshihisa (brother); Shimazu Iehisa (half-brother)
- Children: Shimazu Hisayasu; Shimazu Tadatsune
- Parents: Shimazu Takahisa (father); Sesshō (mother)
- Nickname(s): "Shimazu Demon" (Oni-Shimazu)

Military service
- Allegiance: Shimazu clan Toyotomi clan Western Army
- Rank: Daimyo
- Unit: Shimazu clan
- Commands: Iino Castle
- Battles/wars: Early Battles; Battle of Kizaki; Siege of Takabaru; Battle of Mimigawa; Siege of Iwaya Castle; Kyūshū campaign; siege of Kagoshima; Korean campaign; Imjin War; Gangwon campaign; Jeongyu War; Battle of Chilchonryang; Battle of Sacheon; Battle of Noryang; Sekigahara Campaign; Battle of Sone castle; Battle of Sekigahara

Shimazu Yoshihiro (島津 義弘; August 21, 1535 – August 30, 1619) was the second son of Shimazu Takahisa and the younger brother of Shimazu Yoshihisa. Traditionally believed to be the 17th head of the Shimazu clan, he was a skilled general during the Sengoku period who greatly contributed to the unification of Kyūshū.

== Early life and rise ==
He is said to have been born in Izaku Castle in 1535. He was the castle lord in command of Iino Castle.

Yoshihiro along with Niiro Tadamoto defeated the Itō clan at the Battle of Kizaki, in 1572, and defeated the Otomo clan with his brothers in the 1578 at Battle of Mimigawa. In 1587, facing Toyotomi Hideyoshi's troops that sought to pacify Kyūshū, Yoshihiro pressed for war even after his brother and the head of clan Yoshihisa surrendered. After Yoshihisa repeatedly asked for the surrender, Yoshihiro finally accepted. After Yoshihisa became a Buddhist monk, it was believed that he became the head of the clan, though the real power remained in Yoshihisa's hands.

== Service under Hideyoshi ==
He had been a willing and skillful general under Toyotomi Hideyoshi. In both 1592 and 1597 of the Seven-Year War, Yoshihiro set his foot on the Korean peninsula and successfully carried out a series of battles. In 1597, working together with Tōdō Takatora, Katō Yoshiaki and Konishi Yukinaga, Yoshihiro defeated Wŏn Kyun's navy. At the Battle of Sacheon in 1598, facing a Ming army counting 37,000, Yoshihiro defeated them with only 7,000 soldiers. On the final battle of the war in 1598, the Battle of Noryang, Yoshihiro's objective was to cross the Noryang Strait, link up with Konishi and retreat to Japan. The Korean admiral Yi Sun-sin who had obstructed Yoshiaki died in this battle. Afterward, Yoshihiro rescued the Japanese commanders and returned to Japan.

== Battle of Sekigahara ==
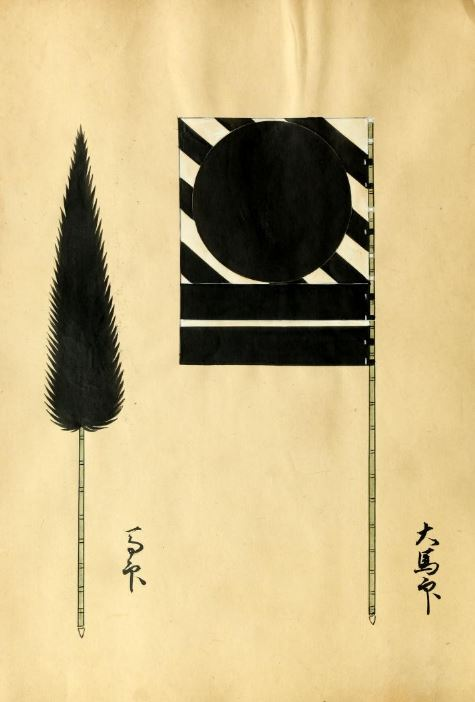
Shimazu Yoshihiro Battle Standards

After Toyotomi Hideyoshi's death in 1598, the land became split between Toyotomi supporters backing Ishida Mitsunari and those that supported Tokugawa Ieyasu, eventually culminating in the Battle of Sekigahara in 1600. According to novels (Rakusuishū 『落穂集』) of the Edo Period, Yoshihiro was initially supposed to Ieyasu's side. He was crushed by Ishida Mitsunari's army upon his arrival for a rescue Torii Mototada during the siege of Fushimi Castle and, after being humiliated, he took the side of Ishida Mitsunari instead. However, recent research indicated that Yoshihiro had chosen to side with Mitsunari from the very start, before Mōri Terumoto announced the declaration of war against the Tokugawa in July 1600. Yoshihiro also played an important role as a member of Mitsunari's core staff and was pivotal in persuading Uesugi Kagekatsu to ally with them.

On September 13, Shimazu Yoshihiro led his soldiers to besiege Sone Castle and bombarding Sone castle with their artilleries. Ii Naomasa and Honda Tadakatsu implored Mizuno Katsunari to repulse the Shimazu forces. In response, Katsunari went out with sallying force with his younger brother, Mizuno Tadatane, to defend Sone Castle. Katsunari ordered his artilleries to return fire at the turret of the Shimazu artilleries, then he led his army to storm the Shimazu position and manage to overcome the Shimazu clan's army, causing Yoshihiro to retreat and abandon the siege against Sone castle. After he beat the Shimazu forces, returned to Ieyasu to ask permission to participate on the Sekigahara main battle which planned in the next day. However, Ieyasu instead ordered Katsunari to guard Sone castle and keep an eyes on Ogaki castle which located nearby and being controlled by Western army loyal to Mitsunari. In response, Katsunari then brought his troops at midnight to surround Ogaki castle, beating a Western army led by Fukuhara Nagataka, and burning the wall and outer citadels of the castle. As Katsunari burned the outer citadels of Ogaki castle, the Western army nearby that area, including the Shimazu clan who had just been beaten by Katsunari's army, decided to abort their plan to go in as they thought the Ogaki castle could not be saved. Then Yoshihiro decided to retreat into Ise Province. (Note: the memorandum about Sekigahara campaign has theorized that the castle was still not fallen at that moment. However, Yoshihiro saw the smoke soared high from the Ogaki castle and though the castle already fallen.)

According to the scripts of Yoshihiro's subordinate Kando Kutarō, Yoshihiro got along with Mitsunari from the start, but their relationship was distorted by the novelists of the Edo Period. It was said that Mitsunari did not listen to any of Yoshihiro's plans, including a surprise night attack on the day before the actual battle of Sekigahara. On the day of the battle, Yoshihiro and his 1500 men held ground and did not fight at all. After the rest of Mitsunari's side was wiped out, Yoshihiro was stranded among at least 30,000 of Ieyasu's troops. Vastly outnumbered, Yoshihiro tried to make a charge against Ieyasu himself but after his nephew Shimazu Toyohisa demanded that he not kill himself over a meaningless battle, Yoshihiro instead chose to charge straight through Ieyasu's troop to make an exit to the other side.

Yoshihiro had his troops make a fighting retreat called Sutegamari (捨て奸), where until a certain number of men died holding a position and repelling an attack, the main body of the army fought as well. Though Toyohisa and the bulk of the troops died, the charge and retreat were a success with a wound dealt to Ii Naomasa in the process. After beating back the chase, he picked up his wife at Sumiyoshi in Settsu Province and returned to Satsuma Province by ships. The Japanese historian Shiramine Jun studied why the Shimazu clan behaved torpidly and deduced it was because Yoshihiro had become involved in the power struggling between his brother Yoshihisa and Ijūin Tadamune. It led Yoshihiro losing the support of Yoshihisa, which trapped Yoshihiro due to the lack of support from the Shimazu clan.

== Death ==
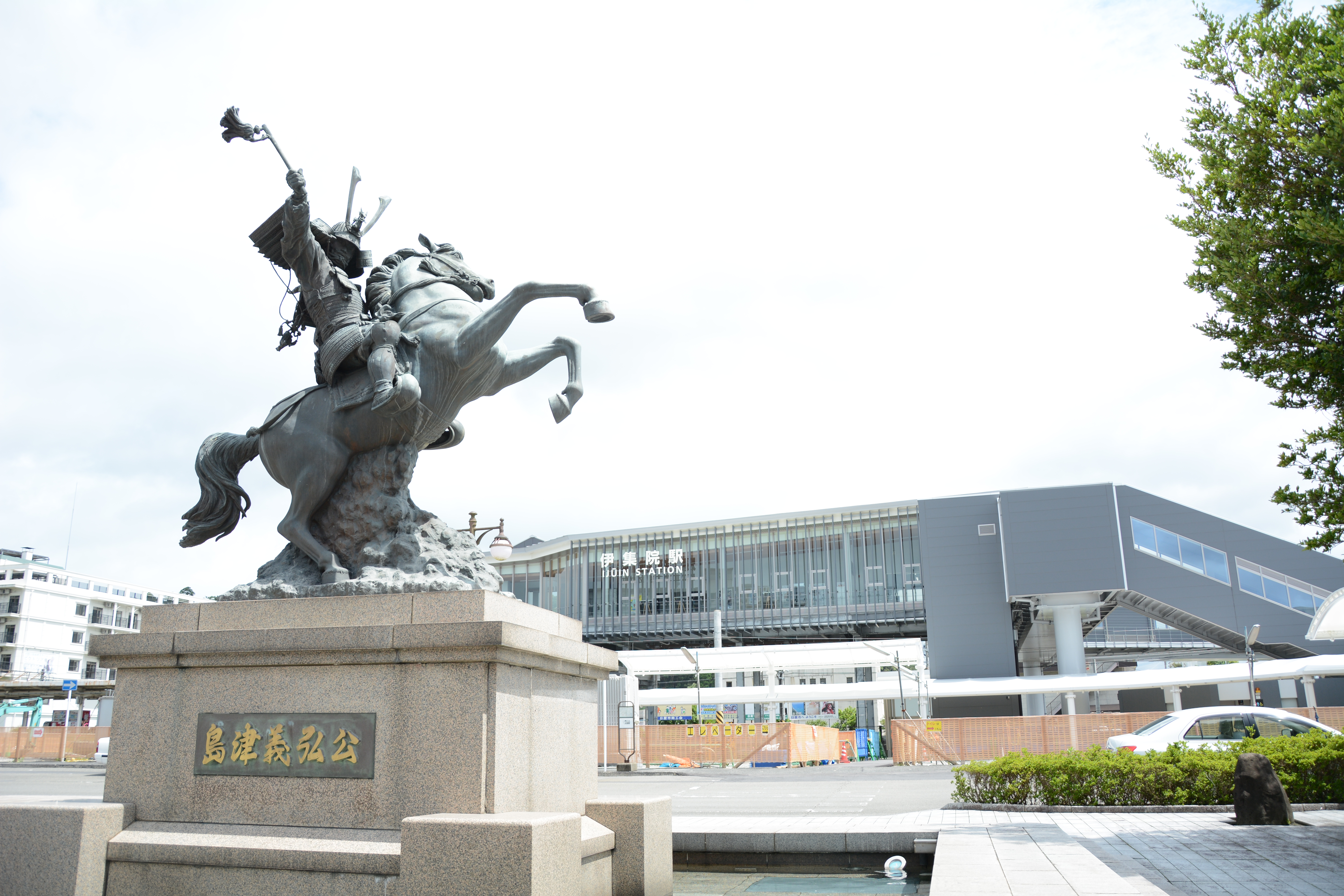
Statue of Yoshihiro at Ijūin Station

In 1602, after recognizing why and how Yoshihiro behaved on the battlefield, Ieyasu had the Shimazu clan retain its domain and let Yoshihiro's son Shimazu Tadatsune succeed him. Yoshihiro retired to Sakurajima and took up teaching younger generations. He died in 1619 and several of his retainers who had fought alongside him followed him by committing suicide.

On August 23, 1918, Yoshihiro was posthumously awarded the courtesy title of senior third rank (shō san-mi, 正三位) by Emperor Taishō.

== Family ==
It had traditionally been believed that he became the seventeenth head of the Shimazu clan after Yoshihisa, but it is currently believed that he let Yoshihisa keep his position. Yoshihiro was essential to the Shimazu clan and both Ieyasu and Hideyoshi tried to divide the clan by treating Yoshihiro well, but treating the elder brother Yoshihisa badly, which did not succeed. He was a devoted Buddhist, and built a monument for enemy troops during the Seven-Year War.

== In popular culture ==
See People of the Sengoku period in popular culture § Shimazu Yoshihiro

He is a playable character in Pokémon Conquest (Pokémon + Nobunaga's Ambition in Japan), with his partner Pokémon being Gurdurr and Conkeldurr.

He is also a playable character in Total War: Shogun 2.

He is a playable character in the Samurai Warriors series of video games.

He is a playable character in the Sengoku Basara series of video games.

He is the main antagonist in Noryang: Deadly Sea and is portrayed by Baek Yoon-sik.

== See also ==
- Shimazu Yoshihiro's retreat from the Battle of Sekigahara

== Appendix ==
=== Bibliography ===
- Hirai, Takato (1992), 福山開祖・水野勝成 [Mizuno Katsunari the founder of Fukuyama], 新人物往来社 / Shin Jinbutsu Ōraisha, ISBN 4404019181, OCLC 28019953
- Shimazu Yoshihiro : 徳永真一郎 『島津義弘』（光文社光文社文庫・1992） ISBN 4-334-71629-6 later （学陽書房 人物文庫 2010年）ISBN 978-4-313-75264-1
- Shimazu Yoshihiro : 加野厚志 『島津義弘』（PHP研究所/PHP文庫 1996） ISBN 4-569-56965-X
- Shimazu Hashiru : 池宮彰一郎 『島津奔る』上下巻（新潮社 2001） Vol1. ISBN 4-10-140816-5, Vol2 ISBN 4-10-140817-3
- Shimazu Yoshihiro : 江宮隆之 『島津義弘』（学研M文庫、2004 ）ISBN 4-05-901162-2
- Sengokuishin Shimazutoeden : 荒川佳夫 『戦国維新 島津東征伝』全3巻（学研歴史群像新書、2004〜2006） Vol.1 ISBN 4-05-402676-1, Vol.2 ISBN 4-05-402864-0 Vol.3 ISBN 4-05-403057-2
- Shimazu-Yoshihiro.com -About Shimazu Yoshihiro (Japanese)
