= Shimazu Tadatsune =

16/17th-century Japanese warlord; leader of Satsuma Domain

- 島津 忠恒
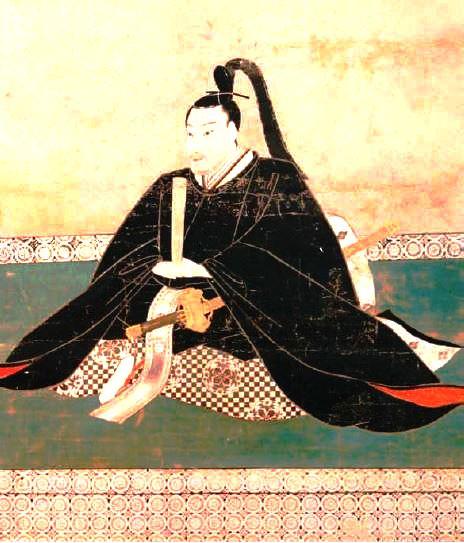

Head of Shimazu clan
- In office 1602–1638
- Preceded by: Shimazu Yoshihiro
- Succeeded by: Shimazu Mitsuhisa

Lord of Satsuma Domain
- In office 1602–1638
- Succeeded by: Shimazu Mitsuhisa

Personal details
- Born: November 27, 1576
- Died: April 7, 1638 (aged 61)
- Parents: Shimazu Yoshihiro (father); Saishō-dono (mother)

Military service
- Allegiance: Shimazu clan Toyotomi clan Tokugawa shogunate
- Rank: Daimyo
- Battles/wars: Korean campaign (1597-1598); Invasion of Ryukyu (1609)

Shimazu Tadatsune (島津 忠恒; November 27, 1576 – April 7, 1638) was a tozama daimyō of Satsuma, the first to hold it as a formal fief (han) under the Tokugawa shogunate, and the first Japanese to rule over the Ryūkyū Kingdom. As lord of Satsuma, he was among the most powerful lords in Japan at the time, and formally submitted to Tokugawa Ieyasu in 1602, to prove his loyalty, being rewarded as a result with the name Matsudaira Iehisa; Matsudaira being a branch family of the Tokugawa, and "Ie" of "Iehisa" being taken from "Ieyasu", this was a great honor. As of 1603, his holdings amounted to 605,000 koku.

== Biography ==
Tadatsune was the third son of Shimazu Yoshihiro. Since Yoshihiro's elder brother, Shimazu Yoshihisa, did not have a son and his other elder brother, Shimazu Hisakazu, had died of illness in Korea, he was deemed successor to their uncle and he later took the name of Iehisa (家久). Like his father and uncle, he was known for bravery on the battlefield.

As head of the Shimazu clan, he sought to remove corrupt or disloyal counselors, and to reform the clan leadership. To this end, in 1599, he killed a long-time retainer and karō, Ijuin Tadamune, as well as his son, Ijuin Tadazane, when they tried to part with the Shimazu clan.

In 1602, he became the head of Shimazu clan but his father held real power until 1619.

On April 5, 1609, Tadatsune led an expeditionary force to the Ryūkyū Kingdom, subjugating it and using it to affect trade with China. The Ryūkyūs were allowed to remain semi-independent, and would not be formally annexed by Japan until after the Meiji Restoration (1868); if China knew that the Ryūkyūs were controlled by the Japanese, trade would have come to an end. Thus, Tadatsune forced this unusual status upon the kingdom.
