= Satsuma Province =

Former province of Japan

Satsuma Province 薩摩国
- Province of Japan
- 702–1871
- Map of Japanese provinces (1868) with Satsuma Province highlighted
- Capital: Satsuma District
- History
  - Established: 702
  - Disestablished: 1871
Preceded by	Succeeded by
Satsuma kuni no miyatsuko	Kagoshima Prefecture
- Today part of: Kagoshima Prefecture

Satsuma Province (薩摩国, Satsuma no Kuni; Japanese pronunciation: [sä́.t͡sɨ̀.mä̀ (nò̞ kɯ̈̀.ɲ̟ì), sä̀.t͡sɨ́.mä́ (nò̞ kɯ̈̀.ɲ̟ì)]) was an old province of Japan that is now the western half of Kagoshima Prefecture on the island of Kyūshū. Its abbreviation was Sasshū (薩州).

== History ==
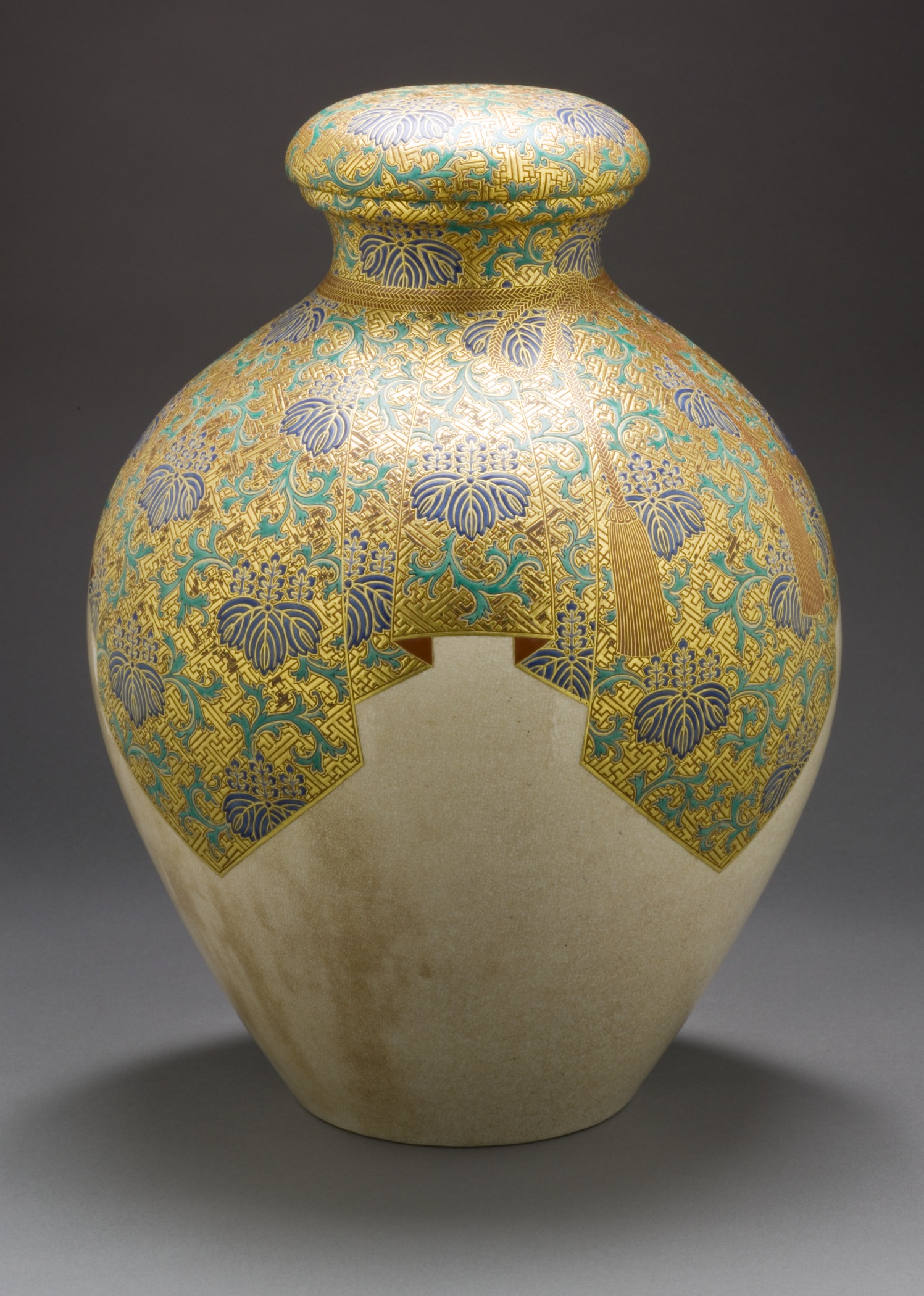
Satsuma earthenware tea storage jar (chatsubo) with paulownia and thunder pattern, late Edo period, circa 1800-1850

Satsuma's provincial capital was Satsumasendai. During the Sengoku period, Satsuma was a fief of the Shimazu daimyō, who ruled much of southern Kyūshū from their castle at Kagoshima city. They were the initial patrons of Satsuma ware, which was later widely exported to the West.

In 1871, with the abolition of feudal domains and the establishment of prefectures after the Meiji Restoration, the provinces of Satsuma and Ōsumi were combined to eventually establish Kagoshima Prefecture.

Satsuma was one of the main provinces that rose in opposition to the Tokugawa shogunate in the mid 19th century. Because of this, the oligarchy that came into power after the Meiji Restoration of 1868 had a strong representation from the Satsuma province, with leaders such as Ōkubo Toshimichi and Saigō Takamori taking up key government positions.

Satsuma is well known for its production of sweet potatoes, known in Japan as 薩摩芋 (Satsuma-Imo or "Satsuma potato"). Satsuma mandarins (known as mikan in Japan) do not specifically originate from Satsuma but were imported into the West through this province in the Meiji era.

== Historical districts ==
- Kagoshima Prefecture
  - Ata District (阿多郡) - merged into Hioki District on March 29, 1896
  - Ei District (頴娃郡) - merged into Ibusuki District (along with parts of Kiire District) on March 29, 1896
  - Hioki District (日置郡) - absorbed Ata District on March 29, 1896; now dissolved
  - Ibusuki District (揖宿郡) - absorbed Ei and parts of Kiire Districts on March 29, 1896; now dissolved
  - Isa District (囎唹郡)
    - Kitaisa District (北伊佐郡) - merged with Hishikari District (菱刈郡) of Ōsumi Province to become the 2nd incarnation of Isa District (伊佐郡) on March 29, 1896
    - Minamiisa District (東囎唹郡) - merged into Satsuma District (along with Koshikijima and Taki Districts) on March 29, 1896
  - Izaku District (伊作郡) - merged into Ata District prior the Meiji period
  - Izumi District (出水郡)
  - Kagoshima District (鹿児島郡) - absorbed Kitaōsumi District (北大隅郡) of Ōsumi Province and Taniyama District of Satsuma Province on March 29, 1896
  - Kawanabe District (川辺郡) - absorbed remaining parts of Kiire District (the village of Chiran) on March 29, 1896; now dissolved
  - Koshikijima District (甑島郡) - merged into Satsuma District (along with Minamiisa and Taki Districts) on March 29, 1896
  - Kiire District (給黎郡) - split and merged into Kawanabe and Ibusuki Districts on March 29, 1896
  - Satsuma District (薩摩郡) - absorbed Koshikijima, Minamiisa and Taki Districts on March 29, 1896
  - Taki District (高城郡) - merged into Satsuma District (along with Koshikijima and Minamiisa Districts) on March 29, 1896
  - Taniyama District (谿山郡) - merged into Kagoshima District (along with Kitaōsumi District of Ōsumi Province) on March 29, 1896

== See also ==
- History of Kagoshima Prefecture
- Japanese battleship Satsuma
- Satsuma Domain
- Shimazu clan
