= Shimazu clan =

Japanese historical noble family

Shimazu 島津
- The Shimazu clan mon
- Home province: Satsuma; Ōsumi; Hyūga
- Parent house: Minamoto clan (Seiwa Genji) (self-proclaimed); Koremune clan
- Founder: Shimazu Tadahisa
- Final ruler: Shimazu Tadashige
- Current head: Shimazu Tadahiro
- Founding year: 12th century (ca. 1196 AD)
- Dissolution: extant
- Ruled until: 1947, Constitution of Japan renders titles obsolete

The Shimazu clan (島津氏, Shimazu-shi; Japanese pronunciation: [ɕí.mä̀.(d͡)zɨ̀, ɕì.mä́.(d͡)zɨ́.ɕì]) were the daimyō of the Satsuma han, which spread over Satsuma, Ōsumi and Hyūga provinces in Japan.

The Shimazu were identified as one of the tozama or outsider daimyō families in contrast with the fudai or insider clans which were hereditary vassals or allies of the Tokugawa clan.

== History ==
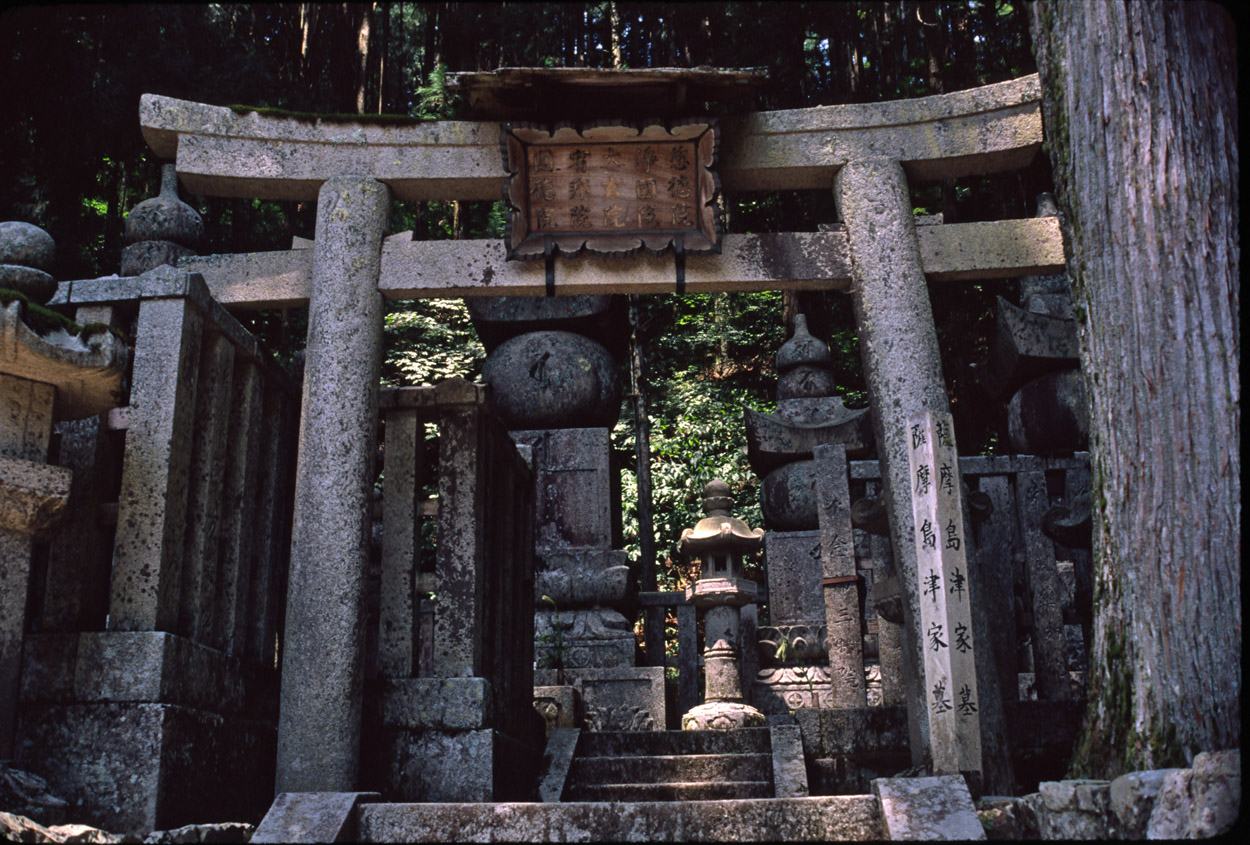
Grave of Shimazu family at Mount Kōya.

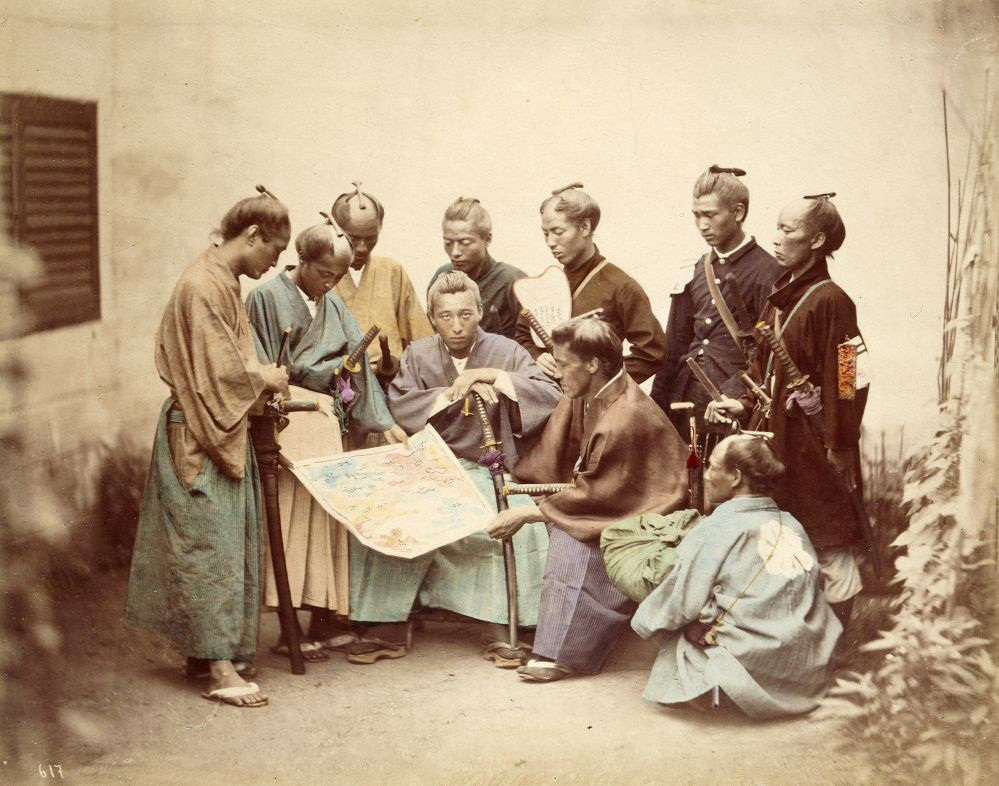
Samurai of the Satsuma clan, during the Boshin War period (1868–1869)

The Shimazu were descendants of the Seiwa Genji branch of the Minamoto. The Shimazu would become one of the families of Edo period daimyō to have held their territory continuously since the Kamakura period, and would also become, at their peak, the wealthiest and most powerful Tozama daimyō family with an income in excess of 700,000 koku.

The founder, Shimazu Tadahisa (d. 1227), was a son of Shōgun Minamoto no Yoritomo (1147–1199) with the sister of Hiki Yoshikazu. Tadahisa's wife was a daughter of Koremune Hironobu, a descendant of the Hata clan, whose name Tadahisa took at first. He received the domain of Shioda in Shinano Province in 1186 and was then named shugo of Satsuma Province. He sent Honda Sadachika to take possession of the province in his name and accompanied Yoritomo in his expedition to Mutsu in 1189. He went to Satsuma in 1196, subdued the Hyūga and Ōsumi provinces, and built a castle in the Hyūga Province as part of the Shimazu Estate, whose name he also adopted.

Shimazu Yoshihisa (1533–1611) was the 16th Head of Shimazu family and the eldest son of Shimazu Takahisa. In 1586, he succeeded in unifying and controlling the entire Kyushu region. He retired in 1587 after Toyotomi Hideyoshi's Kyushu Campaign.

The 17th head, Yoshihiro (1535–1619), was the daimyō at the time of the Battle of Sekigahara, the establishment of the Tokugawa Shogunate, and the Siege of Osaka. His nephew and successor was Tadatsune. He held significant power during the first two decades of the 17th century, and organized the Shimazu invasion of the Ryūkyū Kingdom (modern-day Okinawa Prefecture) in 1609. The Shōgun allowed this because he wished to appease the Shimazu and prevent potential uprisings after their loss at Sekigahara. The trade benefits thus acquired, and the political prestige of being the only daimyō family to control an entire foreign country secured the Shimazu's position as one of the most powerful daimyō families in Japan at the time. The Shimazu clan was renowned for the loyalty of its retainers and officers, especially during the Sengoku period. Some retainer families, such as the Ijuin and Shirakawa, were determined to defeat any opposition to help expand the power of the Shimazu clan. The Shimazu are also famous for being the first to use teppo (firearms, specifically matchlock arquebuses) on the battlefield in Japan, and began domestic production of the weapons as well. Shimazu battle tactics are known to have been very successful in defeating larger enemy armies, particularly during their campaign to conquer Kyūshū in the 1580s. Their tactics included the luring of the opposition into an ambush on both sides by arquebus troops, creating panic and disorder. Central forces would then be deployed to rout the enemy. In this way, the Shimazu were able to defeat much larger clans such as the Itō, Ryūzōji and Ōtomo. Overall, the Shimazu was a very large and powerful clan due to their strong economy both from domestic production through trade, good organization of government and troops, strong loyalty of retainers and isolation from Honshū.

In 1789, Shigehide (1745–1833)'s daughter became the wife of the 11th shogun, Tokugawa Ienari. In 1856, Nariakira (1809–1858)'s adopted daughter (Tenshō-in) became the wife of the 13th shogun, Tokugawa Iesada.

Hisamitsu (1817–1887), regent of Tadayoshi, was the daimyō of Satsuma at the time of the Boshin War and the Meiji Restoration, in which Satsuma played a major role.

== Origin ==
The Shimazu clan claims descent of the Seiwa Genji from the paternal side (Shimazu Tadahisa) while claiming descent of the Koremune clan (branch of the ancient Hata clan) from the maternal side (through Lady Sadatake).

However, Tadahisa's ambiguous genealogy has caused scrutiny among Japanese historians on whether his lineage was truly Genji, since older sources record him under "Koremune", the same clan as his wife. It is believed that after serving as the head steward of the Konoe family, Tadahisa became a retainer to the Minamoto clan where he adopted the clan name and self-proclaimed to be of Seiwa Genji descent. The general consensus is that Tadahisa was of Koremune descent like his wife, and not Seiwa Genji.

=== Christian ancestry theory ===
Mon of the Shimazu clan, often compared to the sun cross.

There is a fringe theory that associates the Shimazu clan with Christianity claiming that the clan was a Christian clan or in some extreme cases, that the clan had Christian (Western) ancestry. The claim compares the mon of the Shimazu clan with the sun cross, stating that the similarity is more than just a coincidence and uses Shimazu Takahisa as an example of the clan's affinity to the religion.

However, due to the fact that the clan's mon was used much earlier than the introduction of Christianity to Japan, and no other genealogical evidence supporting the theory, it is not considered historically or scientifically accurate.

A similar claim and fringe theory was given to the Shimazu clan's ancestor family known as the Hata clan, where pseudohistorians tried connecting the Hata with the Ten Lost Tribes of Israel. The Hata clan, an immigrant clan from Korea, had a convoluted origin with many claims pointing to different civilizations, one of which was Israel under the Japanese-Jewish common ancestry theory also known as "Nichiyu dōsoron". However, much like its descendant clan, the theory is ignored by most modern historians.

== Simplified family tree ==
Incorporates information from the Japanese Wikipedia article

- I. Shimazu Iehisa, 1st Lord of Satsuma (cr. 1601) (1576–1638; r. 1601–1638)
  - II. Mitsuhisa, 2nd Lord of Satsuma (1616–1695; r. 1638–1687)
    - Tsunahisa (1632-1673)
      - III. Tsunataka, 3rd Lord of Satsuma (1650–1704; r. 1687–1704)
        - IV. Yoshitaka, 4th Lord of Satsuma (1675–1747; r. 1704–1721)
          - V. Tsugutoyo, 5th Lord of Satsuma (1702–1760; r. 1721–1746)
            - VI. Munenobu, 6th Lord of Satsuma (1728–1749; r. 1746–1749)
            - VII. Shigetoshi, 7th Lord of Satsuma (1729–1755; r. 1749–1755)
              - VIII. Shigehide, 8th Lord of Satsuma (1745–1833; r. 1755–1787)
                - IX. Narinobu, 9th Lord of Satsuma (1774–1841; r. 1787–1809)
                  - X. Narioki, 10th Lord of Satsuma (1791–1858; r. 1809–1851)
                    - XI. Nariakira, 11th Lord of Satsuma (1809–1858; r. 1851–1858)
                    - Hisamitsu, 1st head and Prince of the Shimazu-Tamari line (Shimazu-Tamari line cr. 1871; cr. 1st Prince 1884) (1817–1887)
                      - Tadayoshi, 12th Lord of Satsuma, 1st Prince Shimazu (1840–1897; r. 1858–1869, Governor of Kagoshima 1869–1871, created 1st Prince 1884)
                        - Tadashige, 13th family head, 2nd Prince Shimazu (1886–1968; 13th family head 1897–1968, 2nd Prince Shimazu 1897–1947)
                          - Tadahide, 14th family head (1912–1996; 14th family head 1968–1996)
                            - Nobuhisa, 15th family head (1938–; 15th family head 1996–)
                              - Tadahiro (1972- )
                      - Tadasumi, 2nd head and Prince of the Shimazu-Tamari line (1855–1915; 2nd head and Prince 1887–1915)
                        - Tadatsugu, 3rd head and Prince of the Shimazu-Tamari line (1903–1990; 3rd head 1915–1990; 3rd Prince 1915–1947)
                          - Tadahiro, 4th head of the Shimazu-Tamari line (1933–; 4th head 1990–)
                            - Tadami (1961 - )
                              - Tadayoshi (1993 - )

== Order of succession ==
1. Shimazu Tadahisa
2. Shimazu Tadatoki
3. Shimazu Hisatsune
4. Shimazu Tadamune
5. Shimazu Sadahisa
6. Shimazu Ujihisa
7. Shimazu Motohisa
8. Shimazu Hisatoyo
9. Shimazu Tadakuni
10. Shimazu Tatsuhisa
11. Shimazu Tadamasa
12. Shimazu Tadaharu
13. Shimazu Tadataka
14. Shimazu Katsuhisa
15. Shimazu Takahisa
16. Shimazu Yoshihisa
17. Shimazu Yoshihiro
18. Shimazu Tadatsune
19. Shimazu Mitsuhisa
20. Shimazu Tsunataka
21. Shimazu Yoshitaka
22. Shimazu Tsugutoyo
23. Shimazu Munenobu
24. Shimazu Shigetoshi
25. Shimazu Shigehide
26. Shimazu Narinobu
27. Shimazu Narioki
28. Shimazu Nariakira
29. Shimazu Tadayoshi (with his father, Shimazu Hisamitsu, as regent)
30. Shimazu Tadashige
31. Shimazu Tadahide
32. Shimazu Nobuhisa
33. Shimazu Tadahiro (current Chairman of the Shimazu limited)

== Other members ==
- Shimazu Toshihisa
- Shimazu Iehisa
- Shimazu Toyohisa
- Shimazu Kameju
- Shimazu Tadahira
- Shimazu Tadamune
- Shimazu Sanehisa
- Shimazu Kiriyama (Exiled, self-imposed)
- Shimazu Shigehide

== Important retainers ==
The Shimazu shichi-tō comprised the seven most significant vassal families—the Niiro, Hokugō, Ijuin, Machida, Kawakami, Ata and Kajiki.

=== Sengoku period ===
- Ijuin Tadaaki
- Ijuin Tadaao
- Ijuin Tadamune
- Ijuin Tadazane
- Niiro Tadamoto
- Tanegashima Tokitaka
- Uwai Kakuken
- Yamada Arinobu
- Yamada Arinaga
- Akizuki Tanezane
- Akizuki Tanenaga
- Ei Hisatora

=== Edo period ===
- Kabayama Hisataka
- Shō Nei, King of Ryūkyū
- Shō Tai, King of Ryūkyū
- Saigō Takamori

== See also ==
- Sengan-en
- Takako Shimazu
- Bombardment of Kagoshima
- Toraijin
- Hata clan
- Shōko Shūseikan
