= List of daimyo from the Sengoku period =

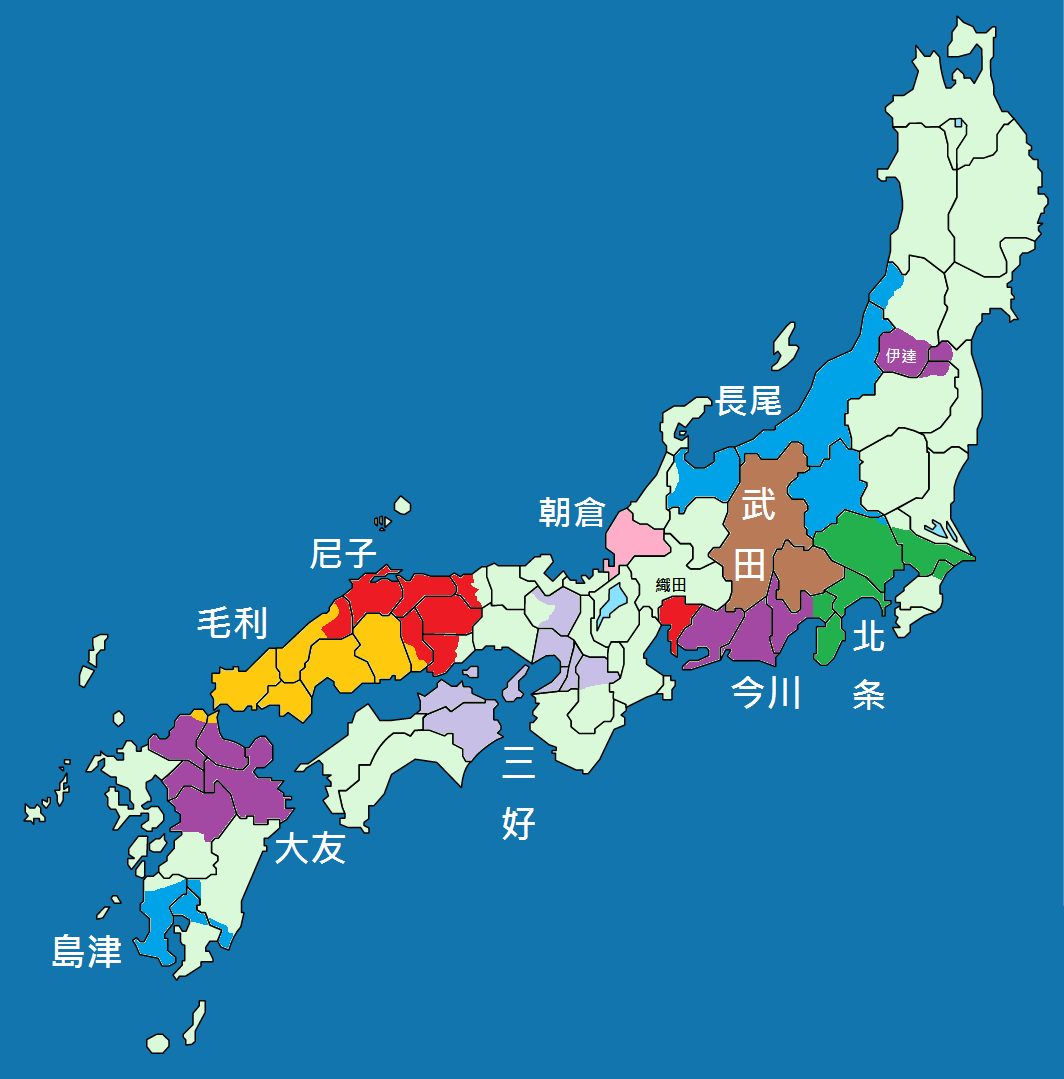
Japan in 1560 (Battle of Okehazama) Pale purple : Miyoshi Nagayoshi Ocher: Takeda Shingen Blue (East): Nagao Kagetora Purple (Center): Imagawa Yoshimoto Green: Hōjō Ujiyasu Pink: Asakura Yoshikage Red (West): Amago Haruhisa Yellow: Mōri Motonari Purple (West): Ōtomo Sōrin Blue (West): Shimazu Takahisa Purple (East): Date Harumune Red (Center): Oda Nobunaga

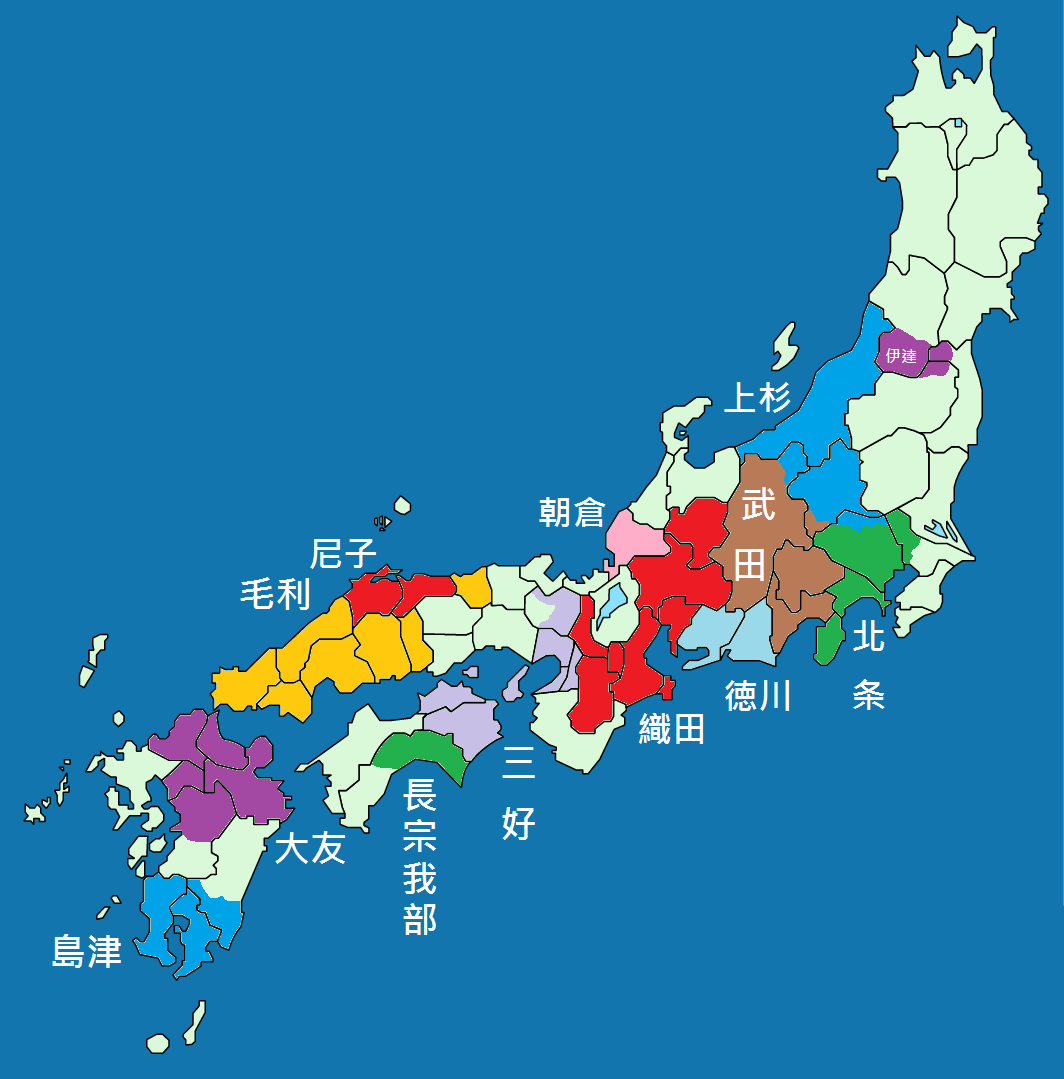
Japan in 1570 (Battle of Anegawa) Red (Center): Oda Nobunaga Ocher: Takeda Shingen Blue (East): Uesugi Kenshin Green (East): Hōjō Ujiyasu Pink: Asakura Yoshikage Yellow: Mōri Motonari Red (West): Amago Yoshihisa Cyan: Tokugawa Ieyasu

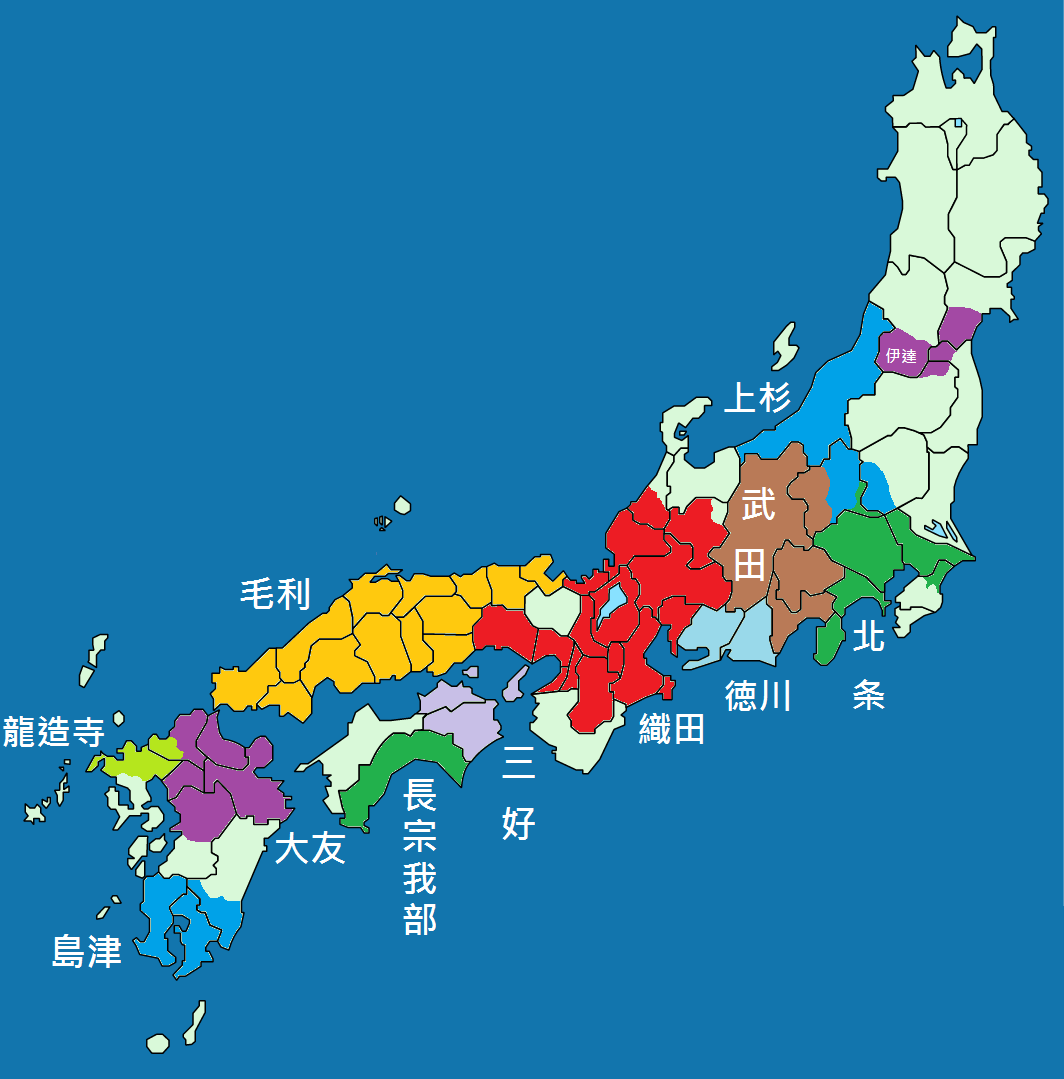
Japan in 1575 (Battle of Nagashino) Red: Oda Nobunaga Ocher: Takeda Katsuyori Yellow: Mōri Terumoto Blue (East): Uesugi Kenshin Green (East): Hōjō Ujimasa Cyan: Tokugawa Ieyasu

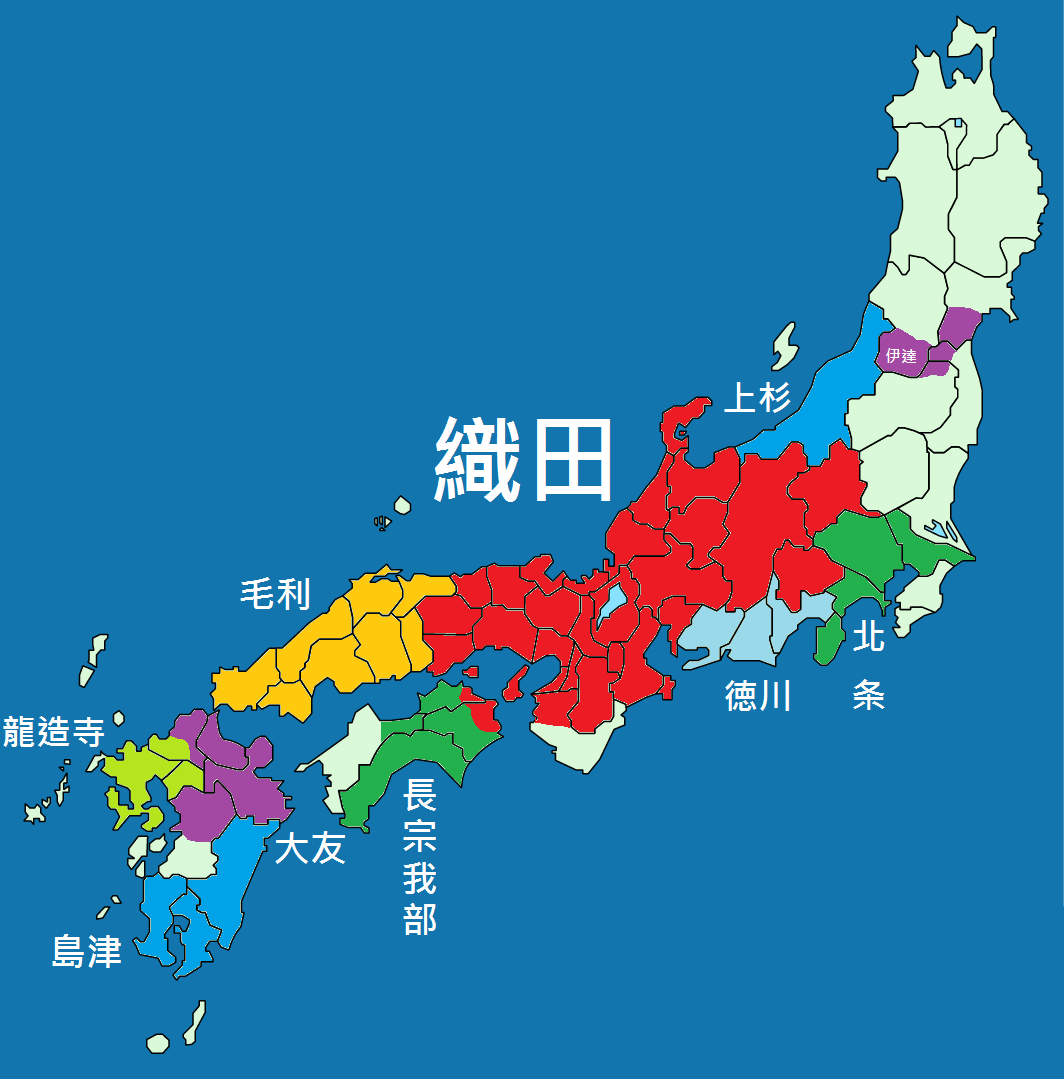
Japan in 1582 (Honnō-ji Incident) Red: Oda Nobunaga Yellow: Mōri Terumoto Cyan: Tokugawa Ieyasu Blue (East): Uesugi Kagekatsu Blue (West): Shimazu Yoshihisa

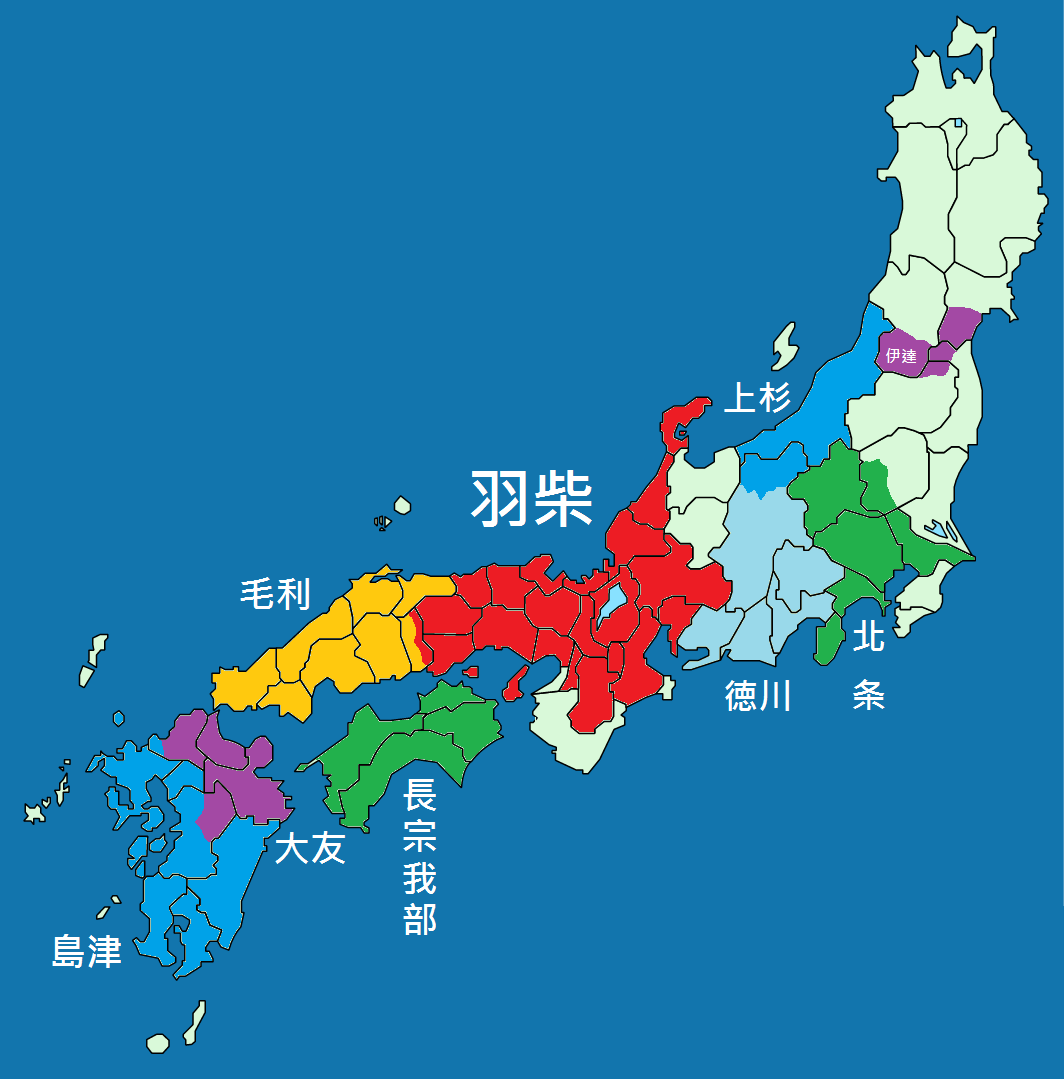
Japan in 1584 (Battle of Komaki and Nagakute) Red: Hashiba Hideyoshi Cyan: Tokugawa Ieyasu Yellow: Mōri Terumoto Green (East): Hōjō Ujimasa Green (West): Chōsokabe Motochika

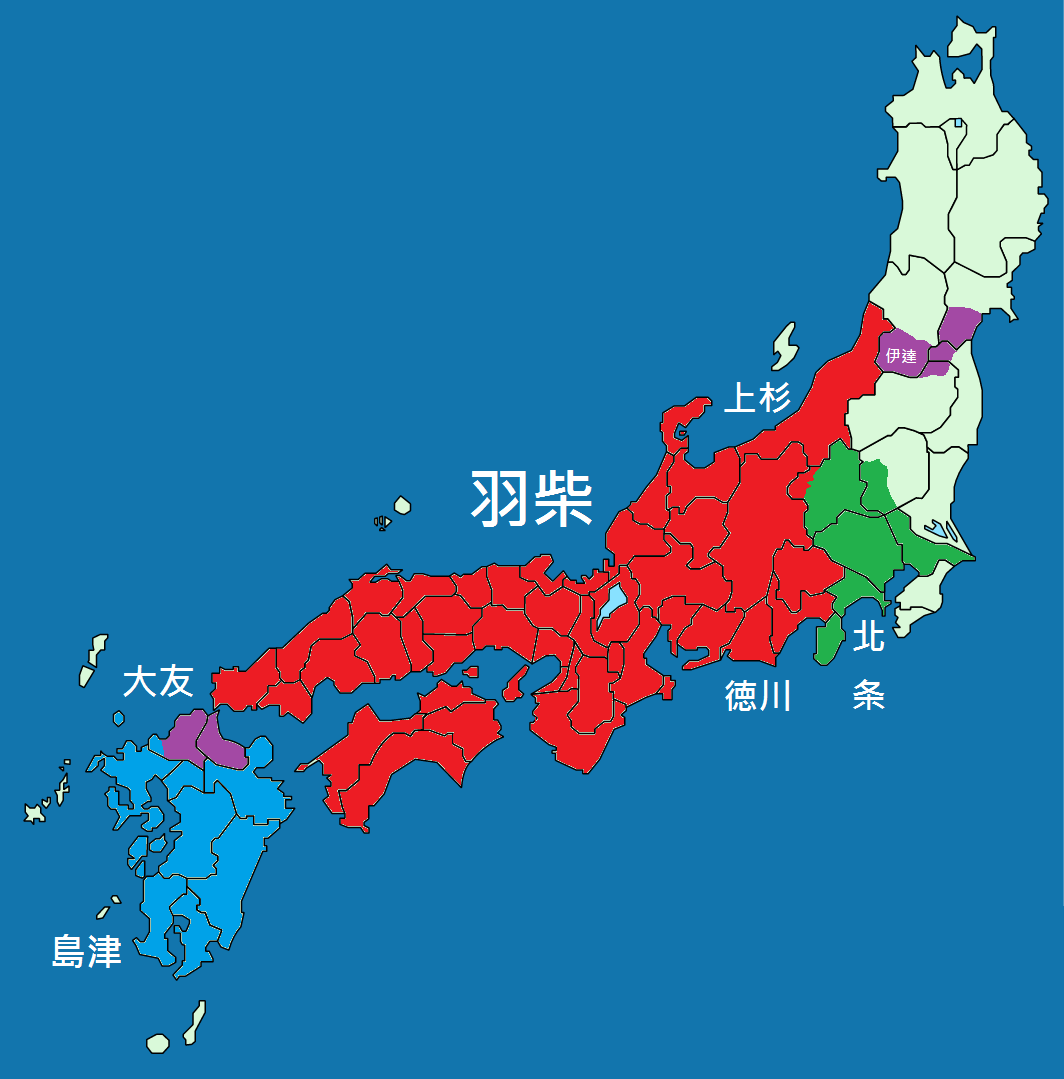
Japan in 1586 (Kyūshū Campaign) Red: Toyotomi Hideyoshi Green: Hōjō Ujimasa Blue: Shimazu Yoshihisa

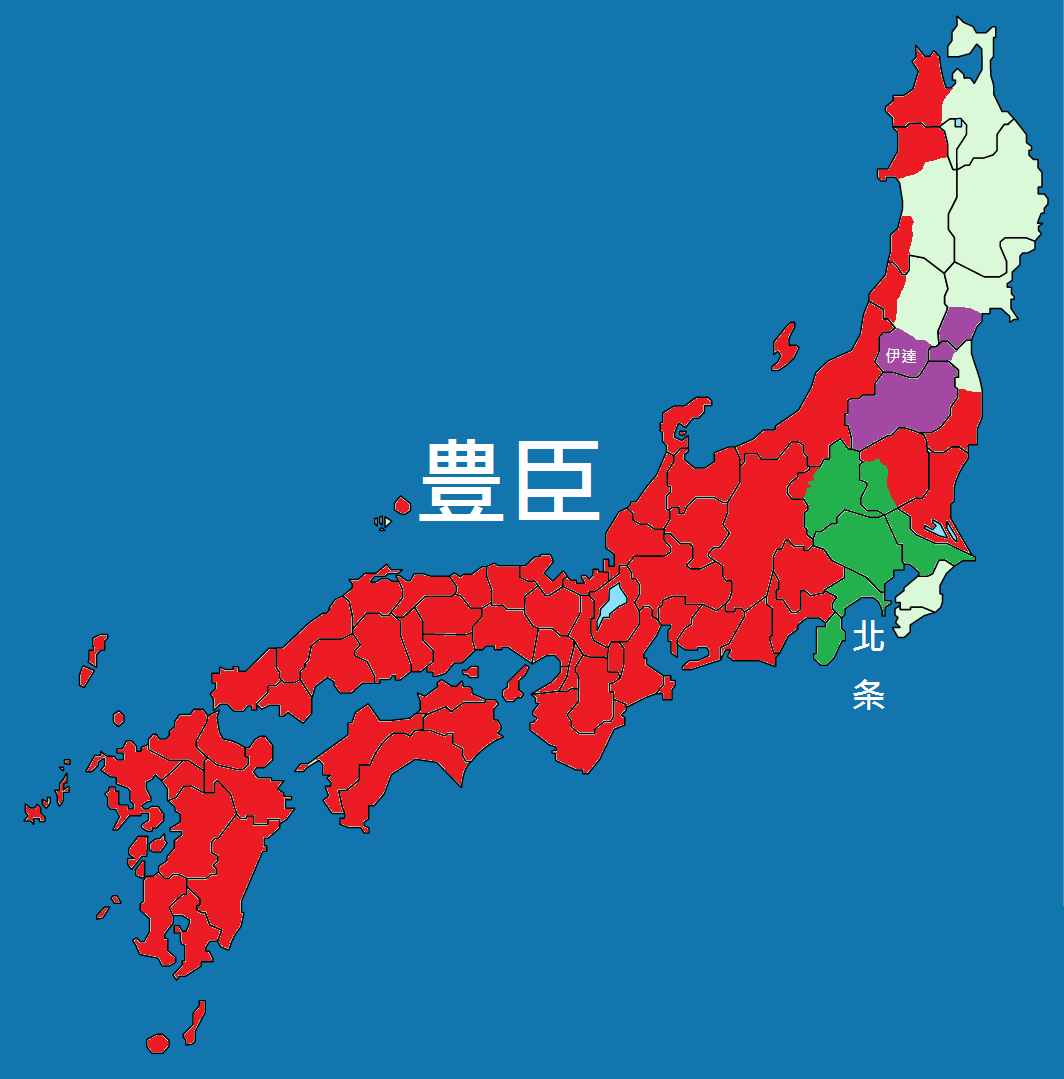
Japan in 1590 (Siege of Odawara) Red: Toyotomi Hideyoshi Green: Hōjō Ujimasa Purple: Date Masamune

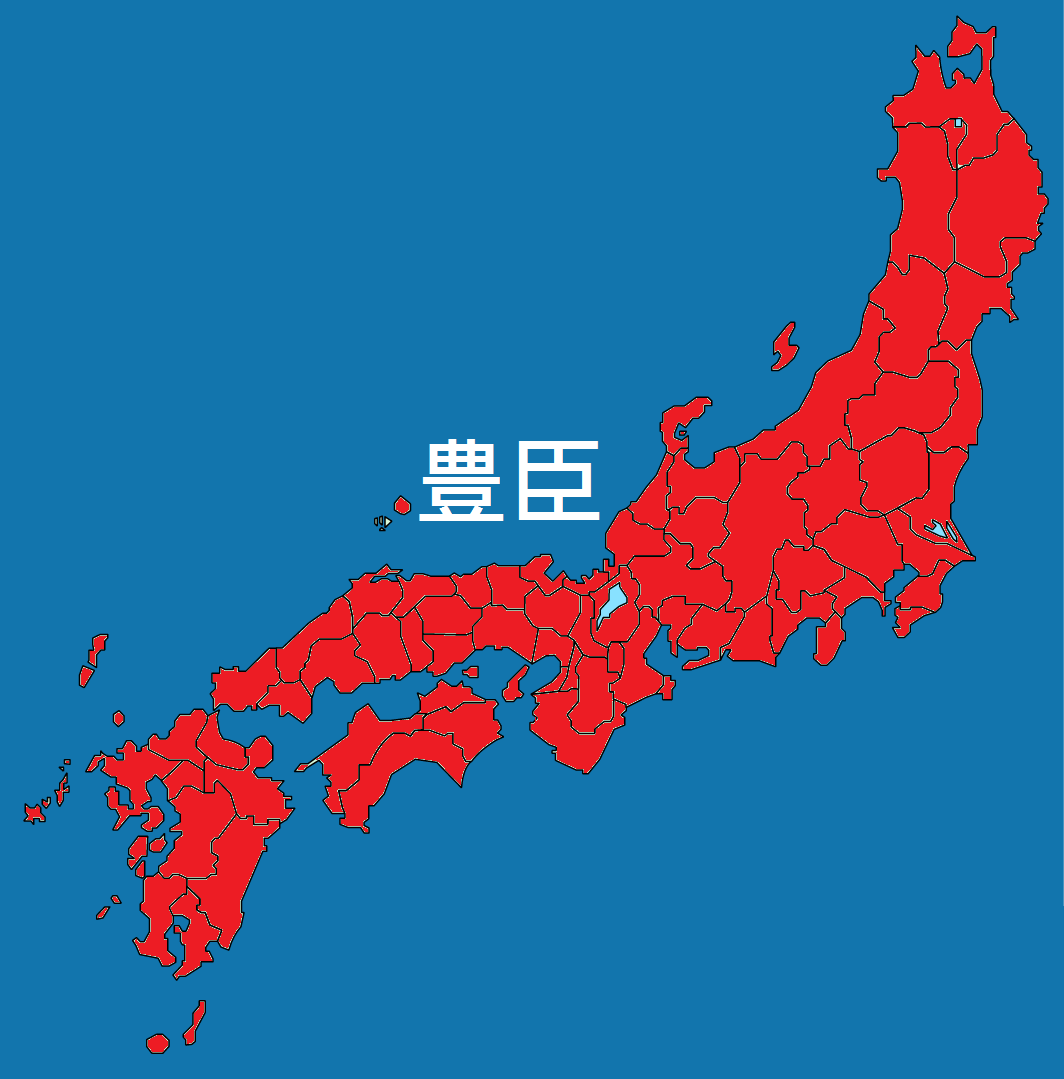
Japan in 1592 (Japanese invasions of Korea) Red: Toyotomi Hideyoshi

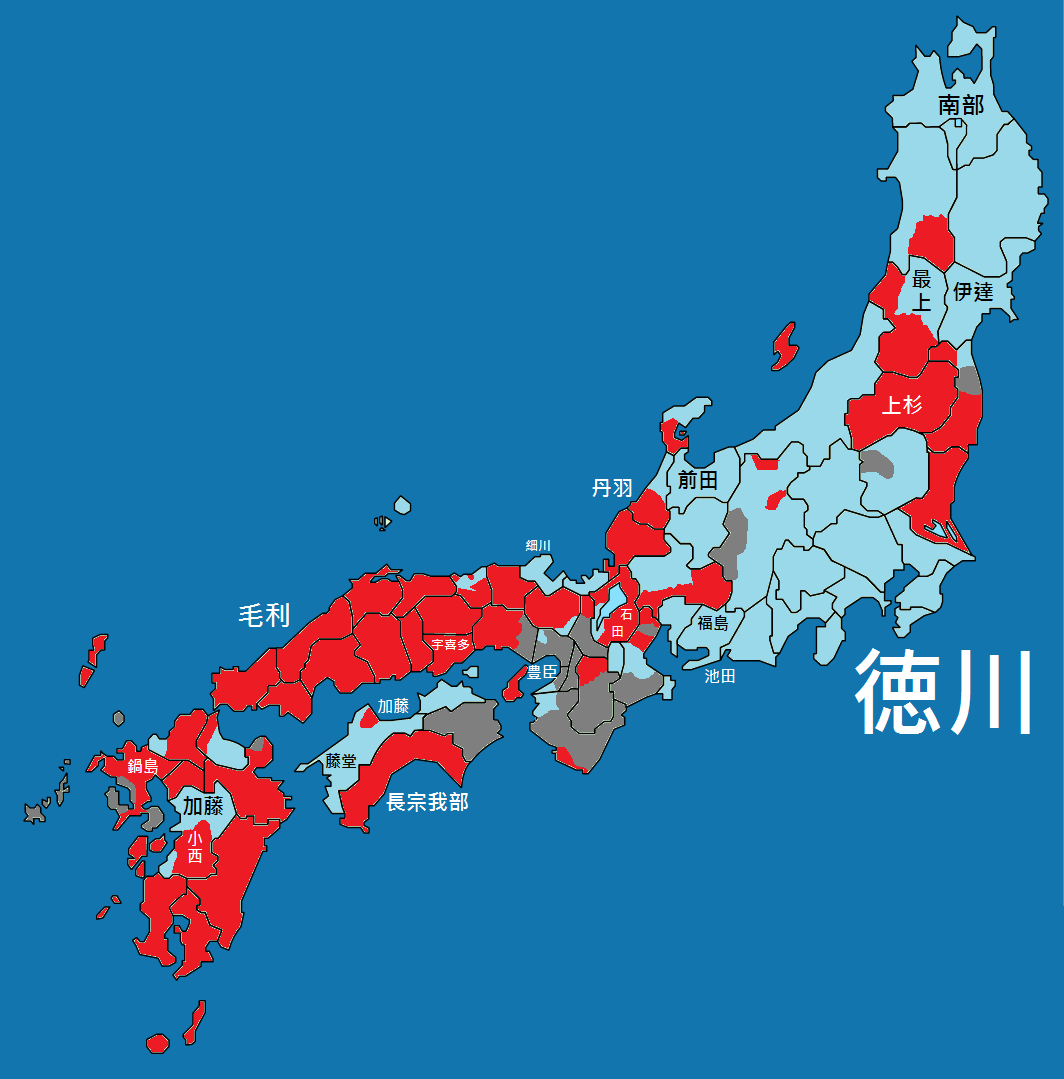
Japan in 1600 (Battle of Sekigahara) Red: Western Army (Ishida Mitsunari, Mōri Terumoto) Cyan: Eastern Army (Tokugawa Ieyasu) Gray: Neutral

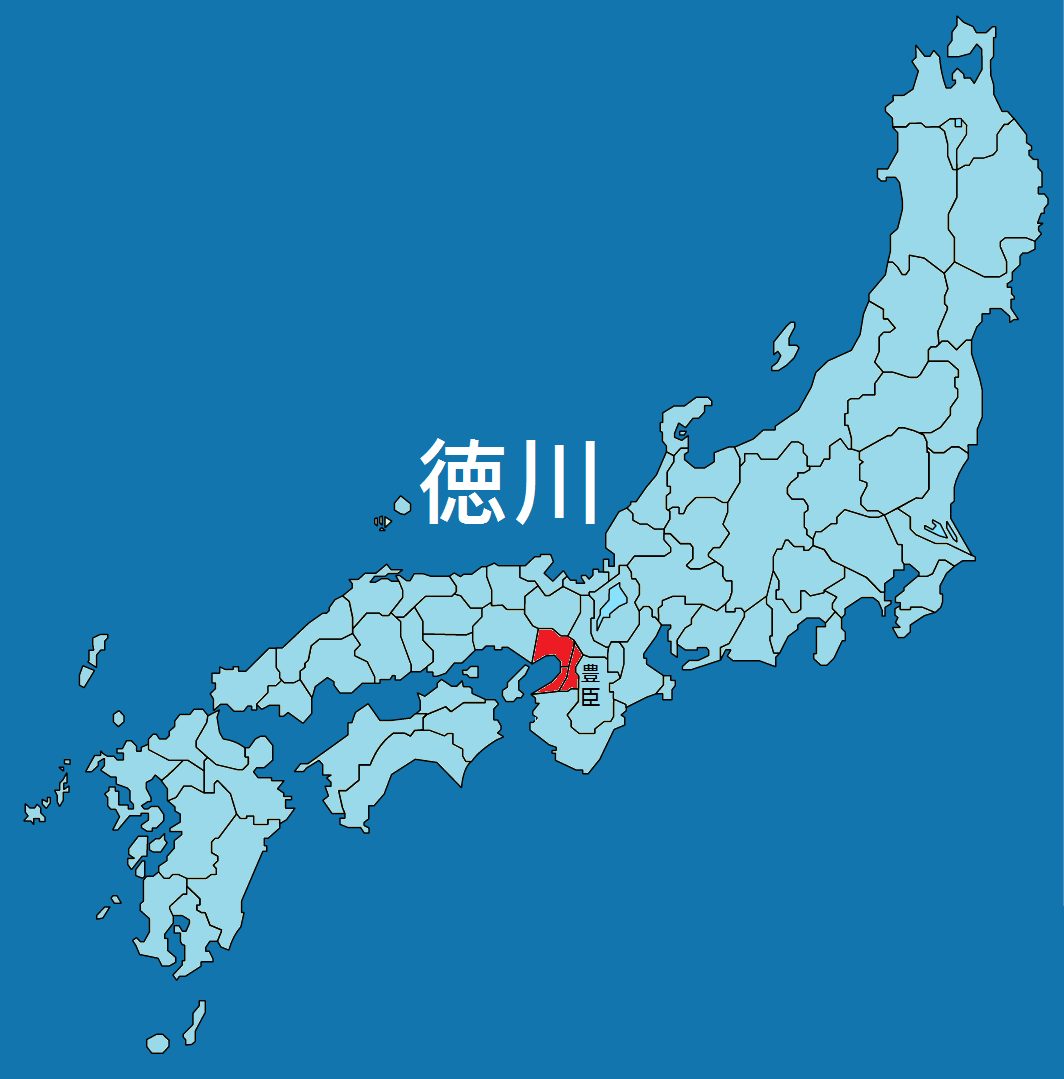
Japan in 1614 (Siege of Osaka) Cyan: Tokugawa shogunate Red: Toyotomi Hideyori

This is a list of daimyo from the Sengoku period of Japan.

== Tōhoku region ==
=== Mutsu Province ===
==== Nanbu clan, Tsugaru clan, Hirosaki Castle ====
- Nanbu Nobunao
- Nanbu Toshinao
- Tsugaru Tamenobu

=== Dewa Province ===
==== Date Clan, Yonezawa Castle / Iwadeyama Castle ====
- Date Harumune
- Date Terumune
- Date Masamune
- Date Sanemoto
- Date Shigezane
- Date Hidemune
- Katakura Kojūrō: Shiroishi Castle
- Katakura Shigenaga
- Oniniwa Tsunamoto
- Oniniwa Yoshinao
- Rusu Masakage: Iwakiri Castle
- Hasekura Tsunenaga
- Kasai Harunobu
- Shiroishi Munezane
- Ōuchi Sadatsuna: Obama Castle

==== Mogami Clan, Yamagata Castle ====
- Mogami Yoshimori
- Mogami Yoshiaki
- Mogami Yoshiyasu
- Shimura Akiyasu
- Sakenobe Hidetsuna
- Shimura Mitsuyasu
- Tateoka Mitsushige
- Tateoka Mitsunao
- Andō Chikasue

==== Ashina Clan, Aizu-Wakamatsu Castle ====
- Ashina Moriuji
- Ashina Moritaka
- Ashina Morikiyo
- Inawashiro Morikuni
- Iwashiro Morikuni
- Matsumoto Ujisuke
- Ishikawa Akimitsu

==== Satake Clan, Kubota Castle ====
- Satake Yoshishige
- Satake Yoshinobu
- Satake Yoshihisa
- Satake Yoshihiro/Ashina Morishige

==== Tamura clan, Miharu Castle ====
- Tamura Kiyoaki

==== Sōma clan, Nakamura Castle ====
- Soma Yoshitane
- Soma Moritane
- Soma Takatane
- Soma Satotane

== Kantō region ==
=== Uesugi clan, Hirai Castle ===
- Uesugi Noromasa
- Nagano Narimasa : Minowa Castle

=== Shimōsa Province ===
- Ashikaga Yoshiuji
- Ashikaga Ujinohime

=== Awa Province ===
==== Satomi clan, Kururi Castle later Tateyama Castle ====
- Satomi Sanetaka
- Satomi Yoshitoyo
- Satomi Yoshitaka
- Satomi Yoshihiro
- Satomi Yoshiyori
- Satomi Yoshiyasu
- Satomi Tadayoshi

=== Sagami Province ===
==== Late Hōjō clan, Odawara Castle ====
- Hōjō Sōun : Nirayama Castle
- Hōjō Ujitsuna
- Hōjō Genan
- Hōjō Ujiyasu
- Hōjō Tsunashige : Tamanawa Castle
- Hōjō Ujimasa
- Hōjō Ujiteru : Takiyama Castle, Hachiōji Castle
- Hōjō Ujikuni : Hachigata Castle
- Hōjō Ujinao
- Hōjō Ujinori
- Hayakawa-dono
- Narita Ujinaga
- Narita Nagachika
- Chiba Naoshige : Moto Sakura Castle
- Kasahara Masataka : Kozukue Castle
- Tame Mototada
- Hara Tanenaga
- Daidōji Masashige : Matsuida Castle
- Matsuda Norihide
- Itō Masayo
- Toyama Naokage

== Chūbu Region ==
=== Shinano Province ===
==== Sanada Clan, Sanada-shi Yakata, Ueda Castle ====
- Sanada Masayuki
- Sanada Yukitaka
- Sanada Nobutsuna
- Sanada Nobuyuki
- Sanada Yukimura
- Komatsuhime
- Chikurin-in
- Karasawa Genba
- Takanashi Naiki
- Yazawa Yorisada
- Yazawa Yoriyasu
- Suzuki Shigenori
- Suzuki Tadashige
- Ten Sanada braves

Murakami Clan, Katsurao Castle

- Murakami Yoshikiyo
- Murakami Kunikiyo/Yamaura Kagekuni

Ogasawara Clan, Fukashi Castle

- Ogasawara Nagatoki
- Ogasawara Sadayoshi
- Ogasawara Sadatsugu
- Ogasawara Nobusada

Suwa Clan, Uehara Castle

- Suwa Yorishige
- Suwa Yoritaka
- Takatō Yoritsugu
- Takatō Yorimune

Kiso Clan

- Kiso Yoshiyasu

Other Clans opposing Takeda Shingen

- Takanashi Masayori
- Ōi Sadataka (大井貞隆)
- Ōi Sadakiyo (大井貞清)

=== Echigo Province ===
==== Nagao/Uesugi Clan, Kasugayama Castle ====
- Uesugi Kenshin : Tochio Castle, Kasugayama Castle
- Uesugi Kagekatsu
- Uesugi Norimasa
- Uesugi Kagetora
- Naoe Kanetsugu
- Naoe Kagetsuna
- Nagao Fujikage
- Nagao Masakage
- Kakizaki Kageie
- Honjō Shigenaga
- Irobe Katsunaga
- Murakami Yoshikiyo
- Kojima Yatarō
- Usami Sadamitsu
- Jōjō Masashige
- Saitō Tomonobu
- Amakasu Kagemochi
- Kitajō Takahiro
- Kitajō Kagehiro
- Nagano Narimasa
- Yasuda Nagahide
- Yasuda Akimoto

=== Mino Province ===
==== Saitō clan, Inabayama Castle ====
- Saitō Dōsan
- Saitō Yoshitatsu
- Saitō Tatsuoki
- Akechi Mitsuhide
- Takenaka Shigeharu
- Takenaka Shigenori
- Hachiya Yoritaka
- Hineno Hironari
- Inaba Yoshimichi
- Ujiie Naotomo
- Andō Morinari
- Nagai Michitoshi
- Ujiie Yukihiro
- Ujiie Naomasa

=== Suruga Province ===
==== Imagawa Clan, Imagawa Yakata ====
- Imagawa Yoshimoto
- Imagawa Ujizane
- Okabe Motonobu
- Udono Nagateru
- Asahina Yasutomo
- Ihara Tadaharu
- Katsurayama Ujimoto
- Otazu no kata
- Iio Tsuratatsu
- Iio Noritsura
- Azai Masatoshi
- Miura Yoshinari
- Matsui Munenobu

=== Owari Province ===
==== Oda Clan, Kiyosu Castle, Komakiyama Castle, Gifu Castle, Azuchi Castle ====
- Oda Nobuhide
- Oda Nobutoki
- Oda Nobunaga
- Oda Nobutada
- Oda Nobutaka
- Oda Nobukatsu
- Akechi Mitsuhide
- Hashiba Hideyoshi
- Niwa Nagahide
- Takigawa Kazumasu
- Shibata Katsuie
- Sassa Narimasa
- Tsuda Nobusumi
- Kanamori Nagachika
- Maeda Toshinaga
- Maeda Toshiie
  - Maeda Keiji
- Hirate Hirohide
- Sakuma Nobumori
- Kajikawa Kazuhide
- Murai Sadakatsu
- Hasegawa Hidekazu
- Harada Naomasa
- Yamauchi Kazutoyo
- Ikeda Tsuneoki
- Ikeda Terumasa
- Fuwa Mitsuharu
- Mori Yoshinari
- Mori Nagayoshi

=== Ise Province ===
==== Kitabatake clan, Kitabatakeshi Jōkan ====
- Kitabatake Tomonori

=== Mikawa Province ===
==== Matsudaira (later Tokugawa) Clan, Okazaki Castle ====
- Matsudaira Hirotada
- Matsudaira Ietada
- Matsudaira Kiyoyasu
- Tokugawa Ieyasu
- Tokugawa Hidetada
- Tokugawa Komatsu
- Sakai Tadatsugu
- Honda Tadakatsu
- Honda Komatsu
- Honda Tadatomo
- Honda Tadamasa
- Hattori Hanzō
- Sakakibara Yasumasa
- Sakakibara Ujimasa
- Ii Naomasa
- Ishikawa Kazumasa
- Torii Mototada
- Watanabe Moritsuna
- Honda Shigetsugu
- Saitō Toshiharu
- Honda Masanobu
- Okudaira Nobumasa
- Ōkubo Tadayo
- Ōkubo Tadachika
- Mizuno Tadashige
- Mizuno Katsushige
- Mizuno Katsunari
- Mizuno Nobumoto
- Hosokawa Tadaoki
- Natsume Yoshinobu
- Naitō Kiyonori
- Kyōgoku Takatsugu
- Kyōgoku Takatomo
- Matsudaira Tadamasa
- Matsudaira Nobuyasu
- Itakura Katsushige
- Matsudaira Yasutada
- Hiraiwa Chikayoshi
- Yoda Nobushige
- Oda Nagamasu

=== Kai Province ===
==== Takeda clan, Tsutsujigasaki Castle/Yōgaiyama Castle ====
- Takeda Nobutora
- Takeda Nobuyoshi
- Takeda Shingen
- Takeda Katsuyori
- Takeda Nobushige
- Takeda Nobutoyo
- Takeda Nobukado

== Hokuriku region ==
=== Echizen Province ===
==== Asakura Clan, Ichijōdani Castle ====
- Asakura Yoshikage
- Asakura Kagetake
- Asakura Kagenori
- Asakura Kageakira
- Kawai Yoshimune
- Asakura Kagetake
- Asakura Norikage
- Makara Naotaka
- Maeba Yoshitsugu
- Magara Naozumi
- Magara Naotaka

=== Eitchū Province ===
==== Jimbo clan, Toyama Castle, Tomisaki Castle ====
- Jimbo Nagamoto

=== Kaga Province ===
- Togashi Masachika

=== Noto Province ===
==== Hatakeyama clan, Nanao Castle ====
- Hatakeyama Yoshifusa
- Hatakeyama Yoshitsugu
- Hatakeyama Yoshitsuna
- Hatakeyama Yoshinori
- Hatakeyama Yoshitaka
- Chō Tsugutsura
- Yusa Tsugumitsu
- Nukui Kagetaka

== Kansai region ==
=== Yamashiro Province (Kyoto) ===
==== Ashikaga Shogunate, Muromachi Palace ====
- Ashikaga Yoshiteru
- Ashikaga Yoshiaki
- Isshiki Fujinaga
- Ōdate Chikanaga
- Ninagawa Chikanaga
- Kyōgoku Takayoshi
- Hosokawa Fujitaka
- Tsukahara Bokuden
- Wada Koremasa
- Mitsubuchi Fujihide
- Yanagisawa Motomasa
- Ueno Hidemasa
- Makishima Akimitsu
- Hino Terusuke
- Settsu Harukado
- Kikutei Harusue

=== Kawachi Province ===
==== Miyoshi clan, Akutagawayama Castle/ Later Iimoriyama Castle ====
- Miyoshi Nagayoshi
- Miyoshi Motonaga
- Miyoshi Yoshikata
- Miyoshi Yoshitsugu
- Atagi Fuyuyasu
- Atagi Nobuyasu
- Sogō Kazumasa : Shōzui Castle
- Sogō Masayasu
- Miyoshi Nagayasu
- Miyoshi Masayasu
- Iwanari Tomomichi
- Matsunaga Hisahide : Shigisan Castle
- Matsunaga Hisamichi
- Miyoshi Nagaharu
- Shinohara Nagafusa
- Inoue Michikatsu

=== Harima Province ===
==== Kodera clan, Gochaku Castile, Himeji Castle ====
- Kodera Masamoto
- Kuroda Mototaka : Mega Castle
- Kuroda Kanbei

==== Akamatsu clan, Okishio Castle ====
- Akamatsu Harumasa
- Akamatsu Yoshisuke
- Akamatsu Masanori
- Tōshōin
- Akamatsu Yoshisuke
- Akamatsu Masahide

=== Tajima Province ===
==== Yamana clan, Konosumiyama Castle, Arikoyama Castle ====
- Yamana Suketoyo

=== Tanba Province ===
==== Akai Clan, Kuroi Castle ====
- Akai Naomasa

==== Hatano Clan, Yakami Castle ====
- Hatano Hideharu

=== Kii Province ===
==== Saika clan & Saika Renegades, Saikazaki ====
- Suzuki Magoichi
- Suzuki Sadayū
- Suzuki Shigetomo
- Suzuki Magoroku
- Satake Yoshimasa

=== Settsu Province ===
==== The Three Shugo of Settsu ====
===== Ikeda Clan (Ikeda Katsumasa) =====
- Ikeda Nagamasa
- Ikeda Tomomasa
- Araki Murashige
- Nakagawa Kiyohide

===== Wada Clan (Wada Koremasa) =====
- Wada Korenaga
- Ibaraki Shigetomo
- Takayama Tomoteru
- Takayama Shigetomo

==== Ishiyama Hongan-ji (until 1580) ====
- Kennyo Hongan-ji
- Shichiri Yorichika
- Ganshōji Shōkei
- Shimozuma Rairen
- Shimozuma Rairyū
- Shimozuma Chūkō
- Shimozuma Raisho
- Shimozuma Shōshin

=== Yamato Province ===
==== Tsutsui clan, Tsustui Castle/ Kōriyama Castle ====
- Tsutsui Junkei
- Mori Yoshiyuki
- Shima Sakon
- Matsukura Shigenobu
- Ido Yoshihiro
- Jimyōji Junkoku
- Jimyōji Sadatsugu
- Takayama Ukon

==== Matsunaga clan, Shigisan Castle, Tamonyama Castle ====
- Matsunaga Hisahide
- Matsunaga Hisamichi
- Yagyū Munetoshi : Yagyū Castle
- Yagyū Munenori

=== Ōmi Province ===
==== Azai Clan, Odani Castle ====
- Azai Hisamasa
- Azai Nagamasa
- Tōdō Takatora
- Akao Kiyotsuna
- Miyabe Keijun
- Kaiho Tsunachika
- Isono Kazumasa
- Ōgawa Suketada
- Atsuji Sadayuki
- Endo Naotsune

==== Rokkaku Clan, Kannonji Castle ====
- Rokkaku Yoshikata
- Rokkaku Yoshisada
- Rokkaku Yoshiharu
- Gamō Katahide : Hino Castle
- Gamo Sadahide
- Hirai Sadatake
- Hirai Takaaki
- Mikumo Shigemochi : MIkumo Castle

== Chūgoku Region ==
=== Bingo Province ===
- Hayashi Narinaga
- Mimura Masachika

=== Inaba Province ===
==== Yamana clan, Tottori Castle ====
- Yamana Toyokuni

=== Izumo Province ===
==== Amago Clan, Gassantoda Castle ====
- Amago Haruhisa
- Amago Yoshihisa
- Amago Tsunehisa
- Amago Masahisa
- Amago Hidehisa
- Amago Katsuhisa
- Uyama Hisakane
- Tachihara Hisatsuna
- Yamanaka Yukimori : Wakasa Oniga Castle
- Yamanaka Mitsuyuki

=== Suō Province ===
==== Ōuchi Clan Ōuchi-shi Yakata/ Kōnomine Castle ====
- Ōuchi Yoshitaka
- Ōuchi Yoshioki
- Amano Takaakira
- Aokage Takashige
- Masuda Fujikane
- Yoshimi Masayori
- Kii Nagafusa
- Kii Shigefusa
- Iida Okihide
- Sue Harukata
- Hironaka Takakane
- Kakinami Takamasa
- Shirai Katatane
- Miura Fusakiyo
- Nogami Fusatada
- Sue Okifusa
- Sue Nagafusa
- Sugi Shigenori
- Sugi Takayasu
- Reizei Takatoyo

=== Bizen Province ===
==== Uragami Clan, Tenjinyama Castle ====
- Uragami Munekage
- Gotō Katsumoto
- Takeuchi Hisamori
- Shimaura Morizane
- Akashi Kagechika
- Nobuhara Kageyoshi

==== Ukita clan, Otogo Castle, Numa Castle, Okayama Castle ====
- Ukita Naoie
- Ukita Tadaie
- Ukita Hideie
- Oka Toshikatsu
- Osafune Sadachika
- Togawa Hideyasu
- Hanabusa Masayuki

=== Aki Province ===
==== Mori Clan, Yoshida-Kōriyama Castle ====
- Mōri Motonari; Sarugake Castle, Yoshida-Kōriyama Castle
- Mōri Okimoto
- Mōri Takamoto
- Kikkawa Motoharu : Hinoyama Castle
- Kobayakawa Takakage : Niitakayama Castle
- Kobayakawa Hideaki
- Mōri Terumoto : Hiroshima Castle
- Mōri Hidemoto
- Nomi Munekatsu
- Ankokuji Ekei
- Kuchiba Michiyoshi
- Katsura Motozumi
- Kumagai Nobunao : Miiri-Takamatsu Castle
- Shishido Takaie
- Shimizu Muneharu : Takamatsu Castle (Bitchū)
- Kunishi Motosuke
- Kodama Narihide
- Kodama Naritaka
- Fukubara Sadatoshi : Suzuo Castle

===== Chūgoku Murakami Clan =====
Noshima Branch / Noshima Castle

- Murakami Takeyoshi
- Murakami Motoyoshi

Innoshima Branch

- Murakami Yoshimitsu (Innoshima Yoshimitsu)
- Innoshima Sukeyasu
- Innoshima Kagetaka
- Innoshima Yoshisuke

Kurujima Branch

- Murakami Michiyasu
- Murakami Michifusa

== Shikoku Region ==
=== Sogō clan / Sogō Castle, Shōzui Castle ===
- Sogō Kageshige
- Sogō Kazumasa
- Sogō Masayasu
- Sogō Nagayasu

=== Ueta clan / Toda Castle ===
- Ueta Yasunobu

=== Kagawa clan / Amagiri Castle ===
- Kagawa Nobukage
- Kagawa Chikakazu

=== Chōsokabe clan, Okō Castle ===
- Chōsokabe Kunichika
- Chōsokabe Motochika
- Chōsokabe Morichika
- Chōsokabe Chikayasu
- Chōsokabe Chikayoshi
- Kira Chikazane : Kira Castle
- Tani Tadazumi
- Kagawa Chikakazu
- Hisatake Chikanobu
- Hisatake Chikanao
- Fukutome Yoshishige
- Kuwana Yoshinari
- Toyonaga Katsumoto
- Yoshida Sadashige
- Yoshida Masashige
- Nakajima Bekonosuke
- Kōsokabe Chikayasu : Aki Castle

==== Ichijō clan, Nakamura Castle ====
- Ichijō Kanesada
- Motoyama Shigemune : Asakura Castle
- Aki Kunitora
- Kumon Shigetada
- Kubokawa Toshimitsu
- Doi Sōsan

== Kyūshū ==
=== Satsuma Province ===
==== Shimazu clan, Izaku Castle / Ichiuji Castle / Uchi Castle ====
- Shimazu Tadayoshi
- Shimazu Takahisa
- Shimazu Yoshihisa : Kokubu Castle
- Shimazu Yoshihiro : Iino Castle
- Shimazu Iehisa
- Shimazu Teruhisa
- Shimazu Toyohisa
- Shimazu Toshihisa
- Shimazu Tadanaga
- Shimazu Tadatoki
- Ijuin Tadamune
- Niiro Tadamoto
- Yamada Arinobu
- Arima Harunobu
- Ei Hisatora
- Akizuki Tanezane
- Tanegashima Hisatoki
- Hoshino Yoshizane
- Hoshino Yoshikane

=== Hyuga Province ===
==== Itō clan, Tonokōri Castle/Sadowara Castle (Obi Castle under Toyotomi rule) ====
- Itō Yoshisuke
- Itō Suketaka
- Itō Sukeyoshi
- Kawasaki Sukenaga
- Kiwaki Sukemori
- Sukemasa Nagakura

=== Bungo & Buzen Province ===
==== Ōtomo Clan, Funai Castle ====
- Ōtomo Sōrin
- Otomo Yoshimune
- Ichimada Shigezane
- Ichimada Akizane
- Tawara Chikataka
- Yoshihiro Shigenobu
- Yoshihiro Muneyuki
- Uchida Shigeie
- Watanabe Noritsuna
- Eguchi Genba
- Miike Shigezane
- Saeki Korenori
- Kitahara Taneoki

==== Tachibana & Takahashi clans, Tachibana castle ====
- Tachibana Dōsetsu
- Takahashi Jōun
- Tachibana Ginchiyo
- Tachibana Muneshige
- Tachibana Naotsugu

=== Hizen Province ===
==== Ryūzōji clan, Muranaka Castle ====
- Ryūzōji Takanobu
- Ryuzoji Yasufusa
- Nabeshima Naoshige
- Ogawa Nobutoshi
- Eriguchi Nobutsune
- Ōmura Sumitada
- Ishii Nobuyasu
- Kinoshita Masanao
- Enjōji Nobutane

==== Sagara clan, Minamata Castle ====
- Sagara Yoshihi
- Marume Nagayoshi
