= Hatakeyama =

Hatakeyama (written: 畠山 or 畑山) is a Japanese surname. Notable people with the surname include:

- Airi Hatakeyama (畠山 愛理, born 1994), Japanese rhythmic gymnast
- Chihei Hatakeyama (畠山 地平, born 1978), Japanese electronic musician
- Kazuhiro Hatakeyama (畠山 和洋, born 1982), Japanese baseball player
- Kensuke Hatakeyama (畠山 健介, born 1985), Japanese rugby union player
- Mamoru Hatakeyama (畠山 鎮, born 1969), Japanese shogi player
- Issey Hatakeyama (畠山, born 1881 - 1971), Japanese Founder of Ebara Pumps
- Hatakeyama Masanaga (畠山 政長, 1442–1493), Japanese daimyō
- Naoya Hatakeyama (畠山 直哉, born 1958), Japanese photographer
- Naruyuki Hatakeyama (畠山 成幸, born 1969), Japanese shogi player
- Satoshi Hatakeyama (畠山 智之, born 1958), Japanese journalist
- Hatakeyama Shigetada (畠山 重忠, 1164–1205), Japanese samurai
- Hatakeyama Shigeyasu (畠山 六郎 重保, died 1205), Japanese samurai
- Takanori Hatakeyama (畑山 隆則, born 1975), Japanese boxer
- Hatakeyama Takamasa (畠山 高政, 1527–1576), Japanese daimyō
- Hatakeyama Yoshifusa (畠山 義総, 1491–1545), Japanese samurai
- Hatakeyama Yoshinari (畠山 義就, died 1491), Japanese samurai
- Hatakeyama Yoshitaka (畠山 義隆, died 1576), Japanese daimyō

== See also ==
- Hatakeyama clan
- 9114 Hatakeyama, a main-belt minor planet
