= Igawa =

Igawa (written: 井川, 伊川 or 飯川) is a Japanese surname. Notable people with the surname include:

- Haruka Igawa (井川 遥; born 1976), Japanese actress
- Hisashi Igawa (井川 比佐志; born 1936), Japanese actor
- Kei Igawa (井川 慶; born 1979), Japanese baseball player
- Igawa Mitsunobu (飯川 光誠), Japanese samurai
- Togo Igawa (伊川 東吾; born 1946), Japanese actor
- Yusuke Igawa (井川 祐輔; born 1982), Japanese footballer

== Fictional characters ==
- Igawa Asagi (井河 アサギ), protagonist of the Taimanin Asagi series
- Igawa Aoi (井川葵), a character from Idoly Pride
- Emi Igawa (井川絵見), a character from Shigatsu wa Kimi no Uso
- Gakuto Igawa (井川 岳人), a character from manga and anime Captain Tsubasa
- Hiroyuki Igawa (井川 ひろゆき), a character from Ten: Tenhō-dōri no Kaidanji
- Ryotaro Igawa (井川 良太郎), a character in the manga Shi ga Futari o Wakatsu made
