= Mitsunobu =

- Gender: Male

Origin
- Origin: Japanese
- Meaning: Different meanings depending on the kanji used

Mitsunobu (written: 光信 or 光誠) is a masculine Japanese given name. Notable people with the name include:

- Igawa Mitsunobu (飯川 光誠), Japanese samurai
- Kanō Mitsunobu (狩野 光信) (died 1608), Japanese painter
- Mitsunobu Kikuzawa (菊澤 光信) (born 1977), Japanese professional wrestler
- Tosa Mitsunobu (土佐 光信) (1434–1525), Japanese painter

== See also ==
- Mitsunobu reaction, organic reaction
