= Naruyuki =

- Gender: Male

Origin
- Origin: Japanese
- Meaning: Different meanings depending on the kanji used

Naruyuki (written: 就行 or 成幸) is a masculine Japanese given name. Notable people with the name include:

- Naruyuki Hatakeyama (畠山 成幸; born 1969), Japanese shogi player
- Naruyuki Naito (内藤 就行; born 1967), Japanese footballer
