= Naomasa =

- Gender: Male

Origin
- Origin: Japanese
- Meaning: Different meanings depending on the kanji used

Naomasa (written: 直政, 直正, 直方, 尚正 or 尚政) is a masculine Japanese given name. Notable people with the name include:

- Akai Naomasa (赤井 直正; 1529–1578), Japanese samurai
- Harada Naomasa (原田 直政; died 1576), Japanese samurai
- Ii Naomasa (井伊 直政; 1561–1602), Japanese daimyō
- Nabeshima Naomasa (鍋島 直正; 1815–1871), Japanese daimyō
- Nagai Naomasa (永井 尚政; 1587–1668), Japanese daimyō
- Naomasa Sakonju (左近允 尚正; 1890–1948), Imperial Japanese Navy admiral
- Naomasa Yamasaki (山崎 直方; 1870–1929), Japanese geographer
- Yasumi Naomasa (安見 直政; died 1572), Japanese samurai
