= Yasumi =

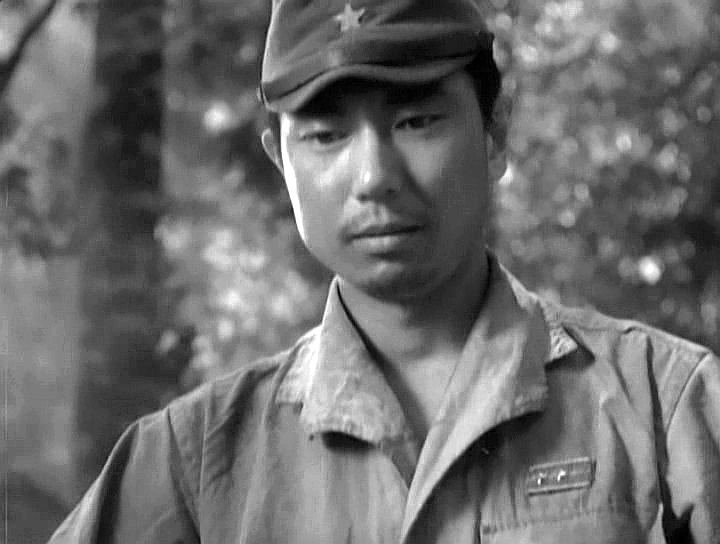
- Yasumi Hara (1915–1997), Japanese actor
- Pronunciation: jasɯmi (IPA)
- Gender: Male

Origin
- Origin: Japanese
- Meaning: Different meanings depending on the kanji used

Yasumi is both a masculine Japanese given name and a Japanese surname.

== Written forms ==
Yasumi can be written using different combinations of kanji characters. Here are some examples:

- 靖巳, "peaceful, sign of the snake (Chinese zodiac)"
- 靖三, "peaceful, three"
- 靖実, "peaceful, fruit/reality"
- 康巳, "healthy, sign of the snake (Chinese zodiac)"
- 康三, "healthy, three"
- 康実, "healthy, fruit/reality"
- 安巳, "tranquil, sign of the snake (Chinese zodiac)"
- 安三, "tranquil, three"
- 保巳, "preserve, sign of the snake (Chinese zodiac)"
- 保三, "preserve, three"
- 保実, "preserve, fruit/reality"
- 泰巳, "peaceful, sign of the snake (Chinese zodiac)"
- 泰三, "peaceful, three"
- 易巳, "divination, sign of the snake (Chinese zodiac)"

The name can also be written in hiragana やすみ or katakana ヤスミ.

== Notable people with the given name Yasumi ==
- Yasumi Hara (原 保美, 1915–1997), Japanese actor
- Yasumi Kobayashi (小林 泰三; 1962–2020), Japanese writer
- Yasumi Matsuno (松野 泰己; born 1965), Japanese video game designer

== Notable people with the surname Yasumi ==
- Kohei Yasumi (八隅 孝平, born 1978), Japanese mixed martial artist
- Naomasa Yasumi (安見 直政; died 1572), Japanese samurai
- Rie Yasumi (やすみ りえ; born 1972), real name: Rieko Yasumi (休 理英子), Japanese senryu poet and writer
- Tom Yasumi (トム・ヤスミ, born 1966), Japanese animation director
- Yoshihiro Yasumi (保見 吉裕; born 1949), Japanese water polo player
