= Chō Tsunatatsu =

Japanese samurai

Chō Tsunatatsu (長 連龍; 1540 – October 26, 1577) was a Japanese samurai of the Sengoku period, who served the Hatakeyama clan. On the occasion of the Siege of Nanao castle, His family was almost all killed by Usa clan including his father Chō Tsugutsura in the Nanao Castle.
