= Chō Tsugutsura =

Japanese samurai

- 長 続連
- Died: 26 October 1577; Nanao Castle
- Military career
- Allegiance: Hatakeyama clan
- Commands: Anamizu Castle
- Conflicts: Siege of Nanao (1576)

Chō Tsugutsura (長 続連; ? – 1577) was a Japanese samurai and commander of the Sengoku period who served the Noto Hatakeyama clan as a senior vassal. He was one of the Noto Hatakeyama clan's seven great senior vassals called Hatakeyama Hichininshu.

On the occasion of the Siege of Nanao castle, he was on the side of the Oda clan and killed by Usa Tsugumitsu who was on the side of the Uesugi clan.

His son Chō Tsunatatsu visited Oda Nobunaga and asked for reinforcements. When Nobunaga's force led by Shibata Katsuie arrived near the castle, Nanao castle had already taken by the Uesugi clan and Tsugutsura was killed.

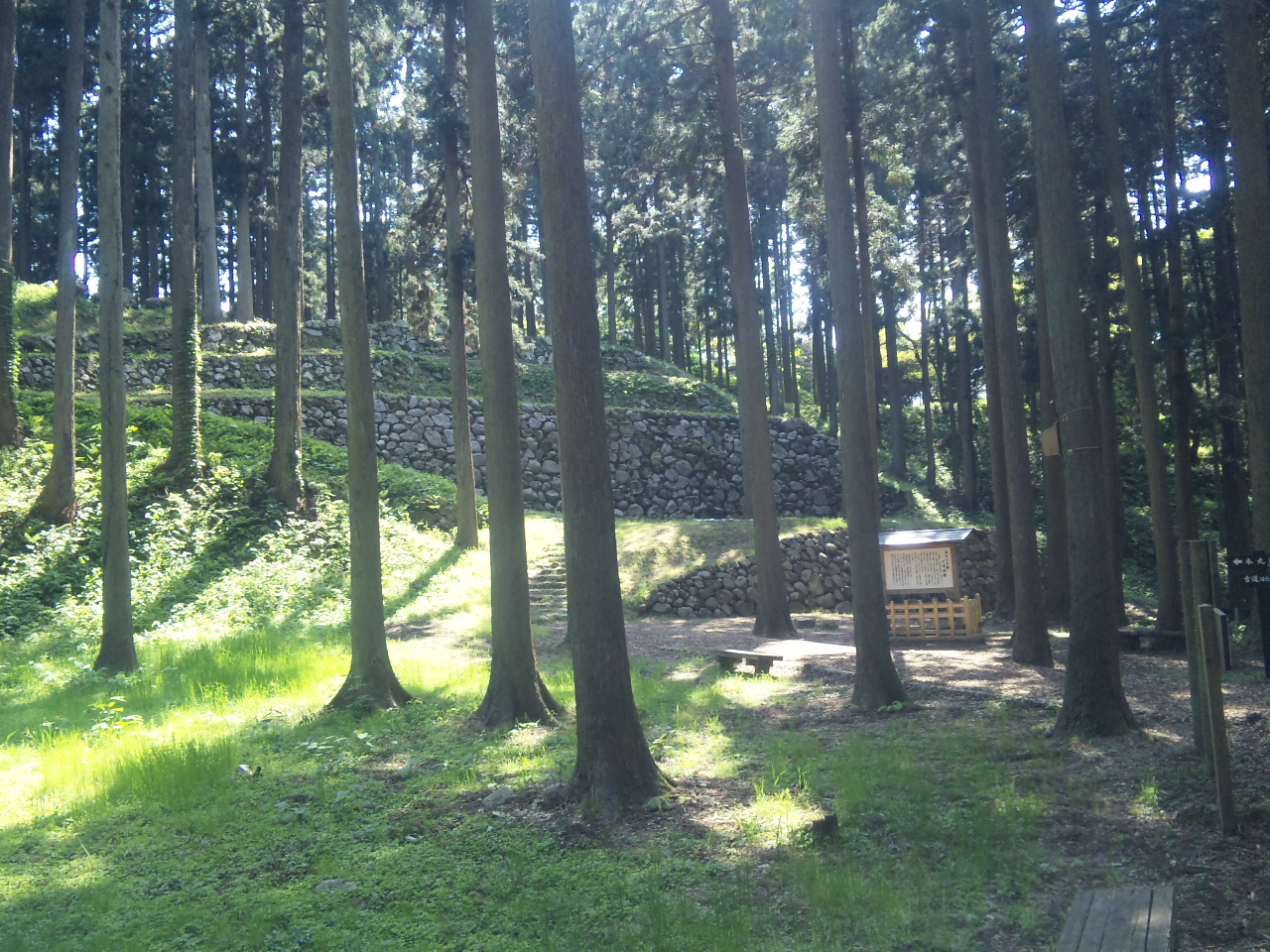
Nanao Castle

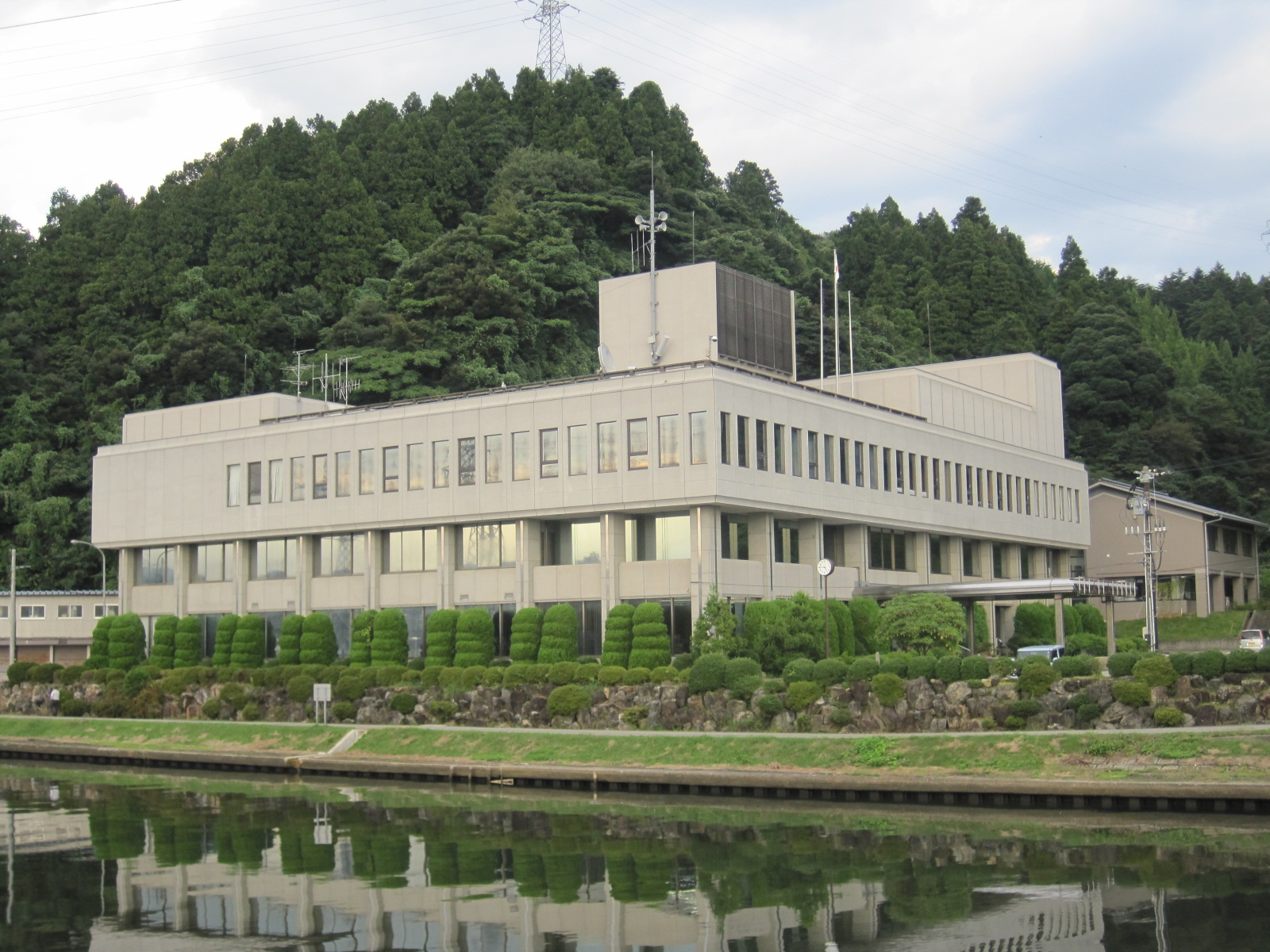
Anamizu Castle (Behind the Building)
