= Hatakeyama clan =

Japanese samurai clan

Hatakeyama 畠山
- Home province: Yamashiro
- Parent house: Taira clan (original line); Minamoto clan Ashikaga clan (restored line)
- Cadet branches: Asano clan (after Asano Nagamasa); Nihonmatsu clan

The Hatakeyama clan (Japanese: 畠山氏, Hepburn: Hatakeyama-shi) was a Japanese samurai clan. Originally a branch of the Taira clan and descended from Taira no Takamochi, they fell victim to political intrigue in 1205, when Hatakeyama Shigeyasu, first, and his father Shigetada later were killed in battle by Hōjō forces in Kamakura. After 1205 the Hatakeyama came to be descendants of the Ashikaga clan, who were in turn descended from Emperor Seiwa (850–880) and the Seiwa Genji branch of the Minamoto clan.

== History ==
The first family being extinct in 1205, Ashikaga Yoshizumi, son of Ashikaga Yoshikane, was chosen by Hōjō Tokimasa to revive the name of Hatakeyama. He married Tokimasa's daughter, the widow of Hatakeyama Shigeyasu (the last Hatakeyama of the first branch), and inherited the domains of the Hatakeyama (1205). Thus the new family descended from the Minamoto (Seiwa Genji).

The clan was an ally of the Ashikaga shogunate against the (Imperial) Southern Court during the wars of the Nanboku-chō period, and was rewarded by the shogunate with the hereditary position of shugo (Governor) of the provinces of Yamashiro, Kii, Kawachi, Etchū, and Noto, at the end of the 14th century. During the 15th century, the members of the Hatakeyama clan held, although not exclusively, the title of kanrei (Shōgun's Deputy), holding great influence over the Imperial Court at Kyoto. Around 1450, there was a split in the clan, and the internal conflict weakened the clan as a whole, causing it to lose the position of kanrei to the Hosokawa clan. This split began with a feud between Hatakeyama Masanaga and Hatakeyama Yoshinari over succession to the position; it quickly grew, as each side gained allies, and was one of the sparks that ignited the Ōnin War.

Nevertheless, the Hatakeyama maintained enough strength and unity to become some of Oda Nobunaga's chief adversaries in Kyoto, a hundred years later.

== Sengoku period ==
By the time of the Sengoku period, the Hatakeyama clan had split into many scattered branches. The most notable of these resided in Kawachi, Mutsu, and Noto provinces.

The Kawachi-Hatakeyama were split into two main rival branches descended from Hatakeyama Masanaga and Hatakeyama Yoshinari. The Mutsu-Hatakeyama held Nihonmatsu Castle saw its power gradually diminish over the course of the Sengoku period, becoming vassals of the Ashina clan.

The Mutsu-Hatakeyama frequently clashed with the Date clan until they were largely destroyed by Date Masamune in 1586 following the Battle of Hitotoribashi.

The Noto-Hatakeyama were based at Nanao Castle and fell from power as an independent house in the 1570s due to internal strife.

== Asano branch ==
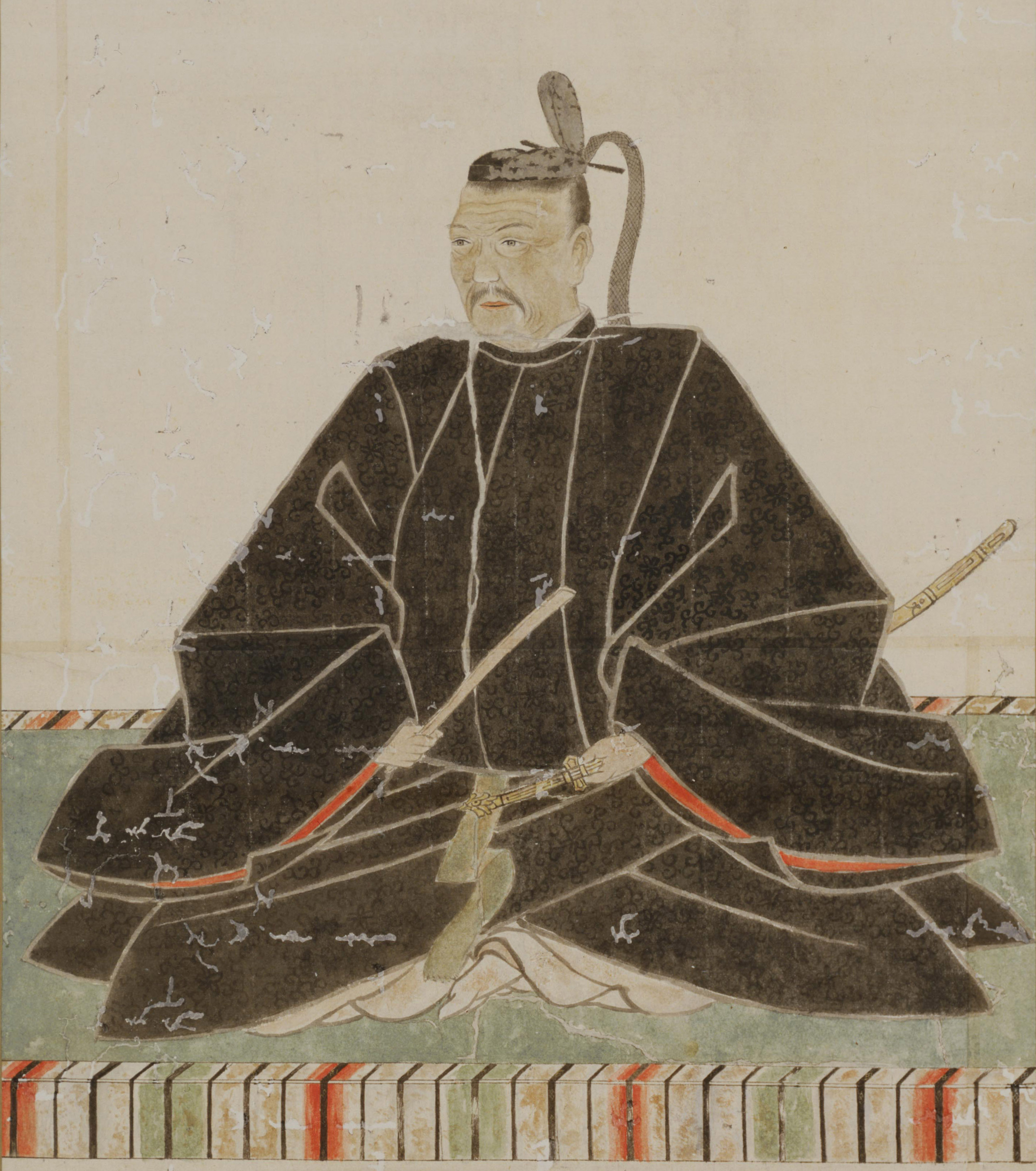
Asano Nagamasa (1546–1611)

Asano Nagamasa (1546–1611) was the son of Yasui Shigetsugu, Lord of Miyago castle (Owari province), a descendant of Hatakeyama Iekuni, Shugo (Governor) of Kawachi province, descending from Ashikaga Yoshikane (1154-1199) of the Seiwa-Genji. Yoshikane was the third son of Minamoto no Yoshiyasu, also called Ashikaga Yoshiyasu (1127-1157), founder of the Ashikaga clan, grandson of the Chinjufu-shōgun (Commander-in-chief of the defense of the North) Minamoto no Yoshiie (1039-1106), and a descendant of the Emperor Seiwa (850-881), the 56th Emperor of Japan.

Nagamasa was adopted by his maternal uncle, Asano Nagakatsu, Lord of Asano castle, younger brother of his mother, and succeeded him as the fourteenth head of the Asano clan.

Until Nagakatsu, the Asano descended directly from the Toki clan and Minamoto no Yorimitsu (948-1021), and after Nagamasa, the Asano are direct descendants of the Hatakeyama clan and the Ashikaga clan.

== Selected clan members of note ==
- Hatakeyama Shigeyoshi - Son of Chichibu Shigehiro. The Founder of Hatakeyama clan.
- Hatakeyama Shigetada (1165–1205) - A samurai who fought for the Minamoto during the Genpei War.
- Hatakeyama Shigeyasu (d. 1205)- Son of Shigetada. Last of the first line of Hatakeyama.
- Hatakeyama Yoshizumi – (1175-1210) Son of Ashikaga Yoshikane. First of the second line of Hatakeyama.
- Hatakeyama Mochikuni – became Kanrei in 1398
- Hatakeyama Yoshinari – rival with Masanaga for Kanrei in 1467
- Hatakeyama Masanaga – rival with Yoshinori for Kanrei in 1467
- Hatakeyama Takamasa (d. 1576) - Head of the Kawachi-Hatakeyama branch
- Nihonmatsu Yoshikuni (1521–1580) - Mutsu-Hatakeyama branch
- Nihonmatsu Yoshitsugu (1552–1585) - Mutsu-Hatakeyama branch
  - Nihonmatsu Yoshitsuna (1574–1589)
  - Nihonmatsu Yoshitaka (1578–1655)

== Clan castles ==
- Nihonmatsu Castle (Mutsu province, a residence of the Nihonmatsu-Hatakeyama branch)
- Takaya Castle (Kawachi province)

== Noto Hatakeyama clan ==
=== Selected clan members of note ===
- Hatakeyama Yoshifusa (1491-1545) - A daimyō of Noto province and became head of the Noto-Hatakeyama branch in 1514
- Hatakeyama Yoshitaka (d. 1576) - The 11th head of the Hatakeyama of Noto Province.

=== Known retainers of the Noto Hatakeyama clan ===
- Yasumi Naomasa (? - 1572)
- Chō Tsugutsura
- Chō Tsunatatsu
- Yusa Tsugumitsu
- Nukui Kagetaka
- Miyake Nagamori
- Igawa Mitsunobu

=== Clan Castles ===
- Nanao Castle (Noto province)
- Anamizu Castle : Chō clan
- Tendō Castle : Nukui clan

== See also ==
- Siege of Nanao
- Battle of Hitotoribashi
- Japanese clans
