= Battle of Kizaki =

1572 battle in Japan

- Part of Sengoku period
Date	June 14, 1572
Location	Kizaki plain, on the Ōsumi-Hyūga border 32°02′22″N 130°49′49″E
Result	Shimazu victory

Belligerents
Shimazu clan	Itō clan

Commanders and leaders
Shimazu Yoshihiro; Niiro Tadamoto	Itō Sukeyasu

Strength
300	3,000
- Location within Miyazaki Prefecture Battle of Kizaki (Japan)

The Battle of Kizaki (木崎原の戦い) occurred on the 4th day of the fifth month of Genki 3 (June 14, 1572) when the forces of Shimazu Yoshihiro defeated the larger army of Itō Yoshisuke. The battle, also known as "The Okehazama of Kyushu".

Following their capture of Obi Castle, the Itō strengthened their position on southern Hyūga and began encroaching on territory belonging to the Shimazu clan. Yoshisuke desired to expand into Ōsumi and with that in mind supported clans antagonizing the Shimazu. Still the Shimazu were able to control Ōsumi and in 1572 offered battle to Yoshisuke in the plain of Kizaki, at the border between the two provinces. The armies at Kizaki had a great disparity in strength, the Shimazu only fielded 300 warriors under Shimazu Yoshihiro, while the Itō possessed as many as 3000, led by Itō Sukeyasu. Outnumbered 10:1, the Shimazu stood in a defensive position and were able to gain victory using their famous feigned retreat.

The battle, also known as "The Okehazama of Kyushu", due to how devastating Yoshihiro's victory was, seriously damaged the forces of the Ito clan and the Shimazu were left in a position to expand north, into southern Hyūga. Four years later, the Shimazu would conclude the destruction of the Itō when they captured Takabaru, forcing Itō Yoshisuke to flee into Ōtomo lands.

== See also ==
- Masakiin
- Iino Castle
