= Battle of Sendaigawa =

1587 battle in Japan

Coordinates: 32.01869°N 130.58786°E

- Part of Toyotomi Hideyoshi's Kyūshū Campaign
Date	June 6, 1587
Location	Sendaigawa, north of Kagoshima, Kyūshū
Result	Toyotomi victory; Satsuma withdrawal

Belligerents
forces of Toyotomi Hideyoshi	forces of Shimazu clan

Commanders and leaders
Toyotomi Hideyoshi; Toyotomi Hidenaga; Katō Kiyomasa	Niiro Tadamoto

Strength
170,000	5,000

The 1587 battle of Sendaigawa was part of the Kyūshū Campaign undertaken by warlord Toyotomi Hideyoshi towards the end of Japan's Sengoku period. The Sendai River (Sendaigawa) was among the final obstacles to Hideyoshi's attack on Kagoshima, the center of the Shimazu clan's domains.

Toyotomi Hideyoshi and his half-brother Hashiba Hidenaga met a Shimazu clan force, led by Niiro Tadamoto, near the river. Despite being vastly outnumbered 5,000 to 170,000, Niiro led his men in a charge against the Toyotomi force, and even engaged the famous warrior Katō Kiyomasa in personal combat before retreating under cover of night.
