= Miiri-Takamatsu Castle =

Castle in Nagano, Japan

- 三入高松城
- Asakita-ku, Hiroshima Prefecture, Japan
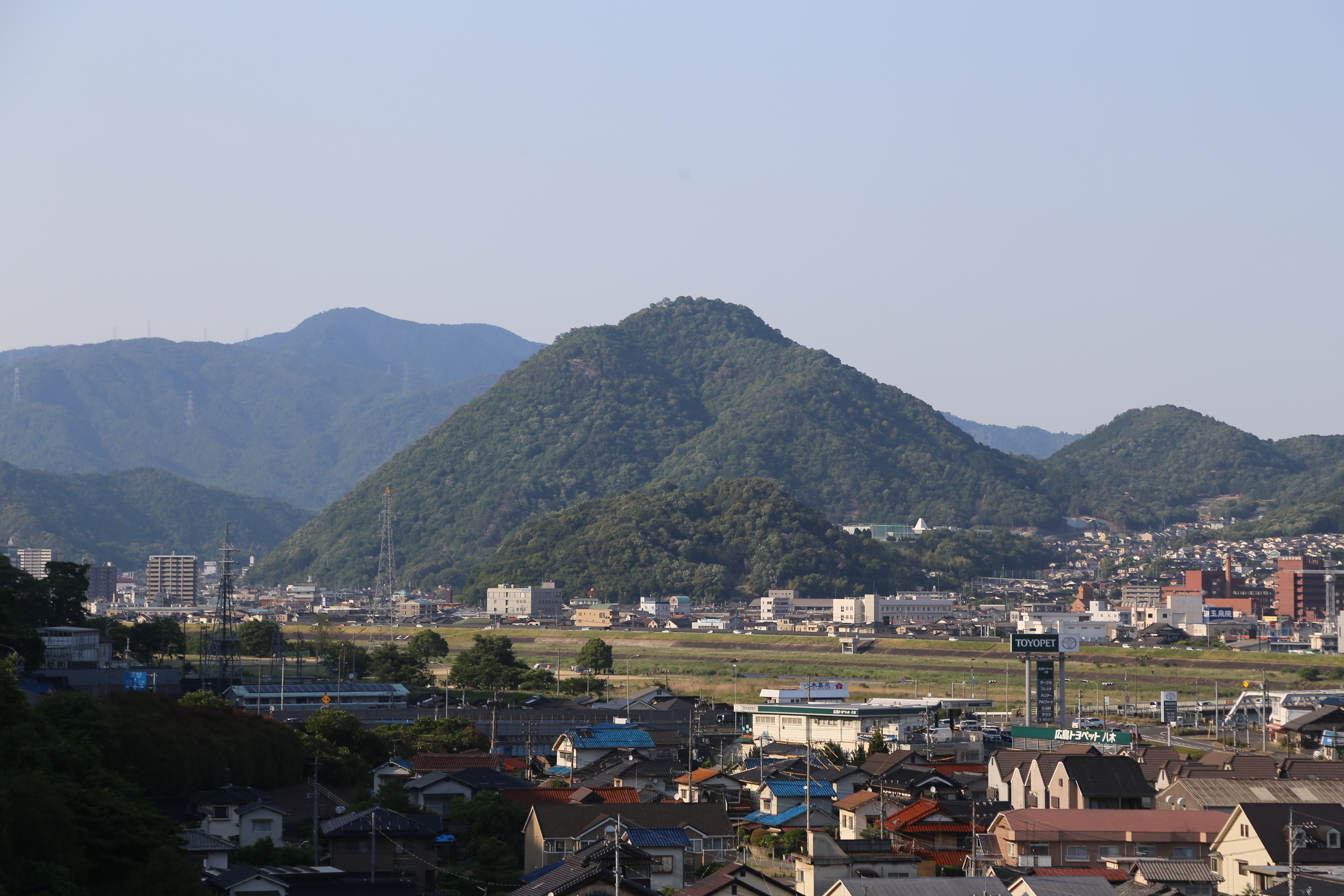
- Miiri-Takamatsu Castle

Site information
- Type: Mountaintop castle
- Owner: Mōri clan
- Controlled by: Kumagai clan
- Condition: ruins

Site history
- Built: Muromachi period
- Built by: Kumagai clan
- Demolished: 1600

Garrison information
- Past commanders: Kumagai Nobunao, Kumagai Takanao

Miiri-Takamatsu Castle (三入高松城, Miiri-Takamatsu -jō)) is the remains of a castle structure in Asakita-ku, Hiroshima Prefecture, Japan. It is located on a 339-meter mountain. One of the 18 Generals of Mōri, Kumagai Nobunao was commander of the castle.

In the Sengoku period, Kumagai clan moved their main bastion from Isegatsubo Castle to the castle since Isegatsubo Castle was considered unsuitable to withstanding a siege, and used the castle until Mōri clan moved to Suō Province.

Its ruins have been protected as a Prefectural Historic Sites as one of the Remains of Kumagai Clan Ruins, combining both Isegatsubo Castle and Kumagai clan's fortified residence Doi-Yashiki.
