= Soma Moritane =

Japanese samurai

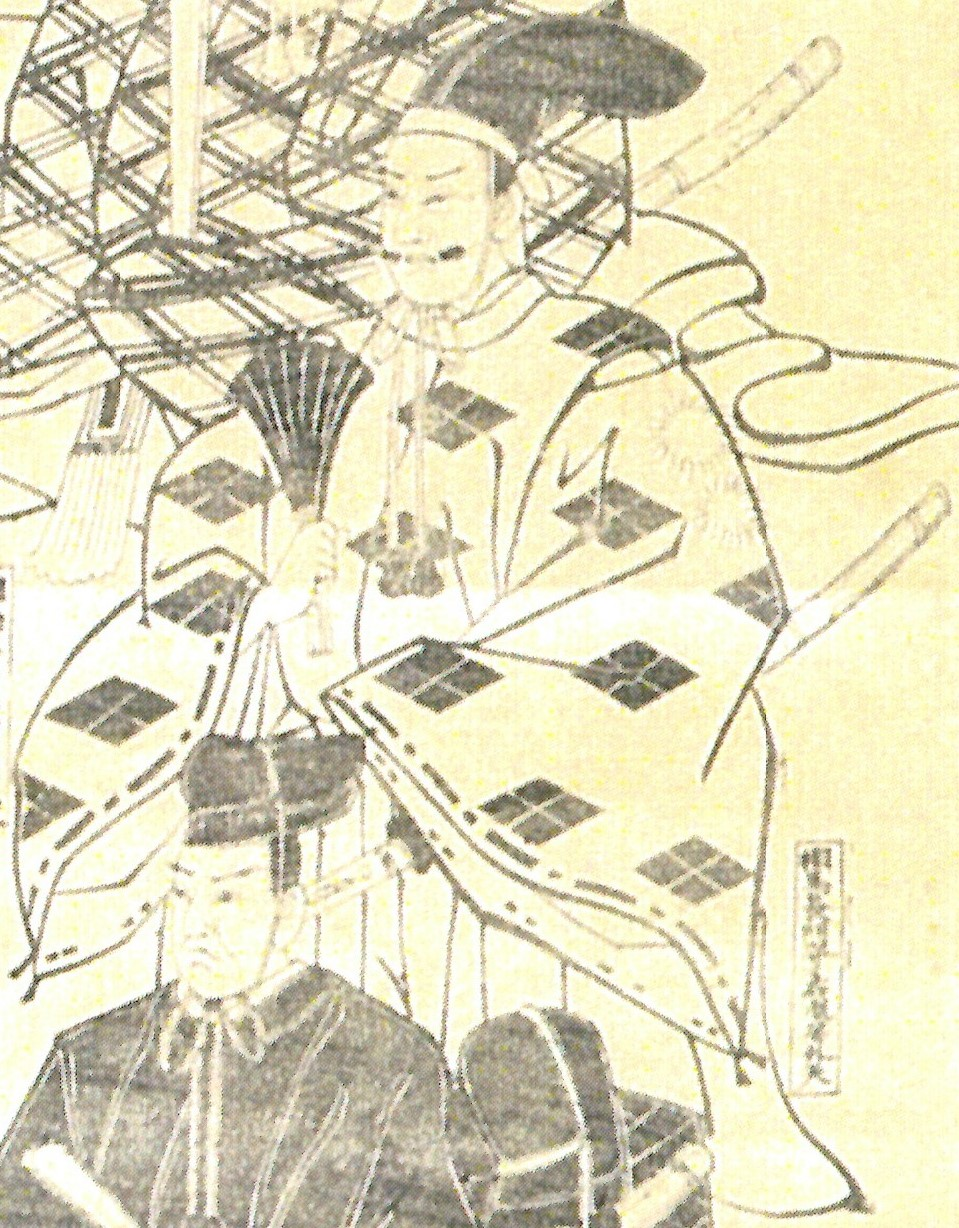
Sōma Moritane

Sōma Moritane (相馬 盛胤; 1529–1601) was a Japanese samurai of the Sengoku period. He was the 15th generation head of the Soma clan, and a key figure in the fighting that took place in northern Japan, especially with the Date clan. Father of Soma Yōshitane.
