= Mamoru Hatakeyama =

Japanese professional shogi player (born 1969)

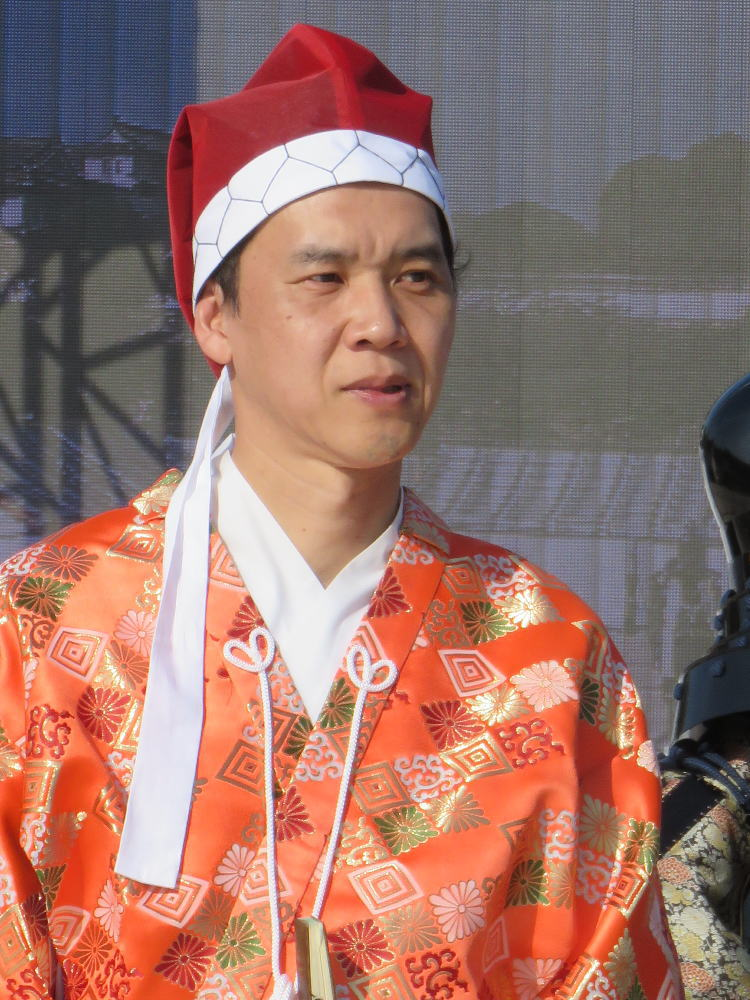
- Hatakeyama at a human shogi event in November 2018.
- Native name: 畠山鎮
- Born: June 3, 1969 (age 56)
- Hometown: Kanagawa Prefecture
- Nationality: Japanese

Career
- Achieved professional status: October 1, 1989 (aged 20)
- Badge Number: 192
- Rank: 8-dan
- Teacher: Masayuki Moriyasu (7-dan)
- Meijin class: C1
- Ryūō class: 5
- Notable students: Shintarō Saitō; Takayuki Kuroda

Websites
- JSA profile page

Mamoru Hatakeyama (畠山 鎮, Hatakeyama Mamoru; born June 3, 1969) is a Japanese professional shogi player ranked 8-dan.

== Early life and apprenticeship ==
Hatakeyama was born in Kanagawa Prefecture on June 3, 1969. He earned how to play shogi when he was seven years old after watching his eldest brother playing against his father. Although he and his twin brother Naruyuki learned the game at the same age, he always seem to following in Naruyuki's footsteps.

He entered the Japan Shogi Association's apprentice school in 1984 as apprentice to shogi professional Masayuki Moriyasu at the rank of 6-kyū, even though Naruyuki had entered a year earlier and was already ranked 3-kyū. Hatakeyama was promoted to 1-dan in 1986 (the same year as Naruyuki), and to full-professional status and the rank of 4-dan in October 1989 along with Naruyuki after both brothers finished the 5th 3-dan League (April 1989 – September 1989) with records of 12 wins and 6 losses.

== Shogi professional ==
In 2003, Hatakeyama became the first shogi professional to lose an official NHK Cup NHK Cup TV Shogi Tournament game to a female shogi professional when he was defeated by Hiroe Nakai in Round 1 of the 53rd NHK Cup.

On September 11, 2023, Hatakeyama became the 60th professional player to win 600 official games.

=== Promotion history ===
Hatakeyama's promotion history is as follows:

- 6-kyū: 1984
- 1-dan: 1986
- 4-dan: October 1, 1989
- 5-dan: December 24, 1993
- 6-dan: April 27, 1999
- 7-dan: April 1, 2006
- 8-dan: September 12, 2019

=== Awards and honors ===
In 2014, Hatakeyama received the Japan Shogi Association's "25 Years Service Award" for being an active professional for twenty-five years. In September 2023, he was awarded the JSA's "Shogi Honor Award"for winning 600 official games.

== Personal life ==
Hatakeyama's twin brother Naruyuki is also a professional shogi player. They are the only twins to become professional in history and both became (4-dan) professionals on the same day.
