= Nagai Michitoshi =

Nagai Michitoshi (長井 道利, died September 17, 1571), also known as Nagai Hayato No Kami, was a retainer in the Japanese Saitō clan following the 16th-century Sengoku period.

The brother of Saitō Dōsan, the "Serpent Daimyō", Michitoshi was made an officer of the Saitō clan. When Saitō Yoshitatsu, a son of Dōsan, and he clashed in a fight, Michitoshi took the side of Yoshitatsu. Michitoshi later fought under Saitō Tatsuoki, the son of Yoshitatsu, against the Oda clan during the Mino campaign. After their castle was taken over by the Oda forces, Michitoshi accompanied Tatsuoki into exile.
