= Magara Naotaka =

Samurai (1536–1570)

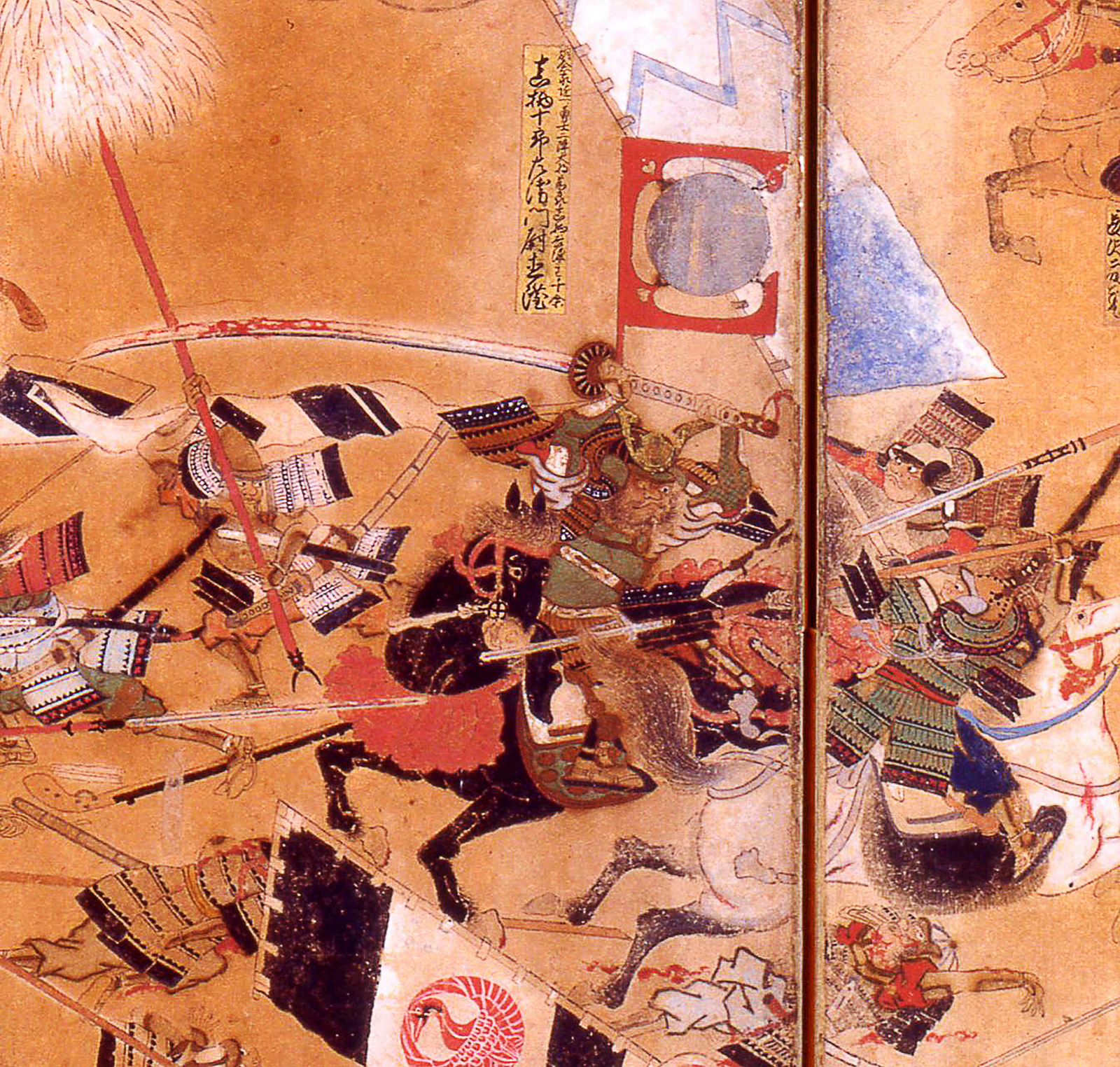
Magara Naotaka in the Battle of Anegawa.

Magara Jūrōzaemon Naotaka (真柄 十郎左衛門 直隆; 1536 – August 9, 1570) was a Japanese samurai of the Sengoku period, who served the Asakura clan. Magara was a big man with a height of 7 shaku (210 centimetres (83 in)) and was famed for his skill with the ōdachi.

During the 1570 Battle of Anegawa, he served on the front lines, together with his son Naomoto. They supported the Asakura army's retreat from the forces of Oda Nobunaga and Tokugawa Ieyasu. There is also a report of Naotaka fought in a one on one duel against Honda Tadakatsu. However, The duel was cut short as during their duel, the Asakura army started to retreat. (Note: Daimon Watanabe, professor of Bukkyo University, and director of Japan institute of arts and culture stated this duel between Tadakatsu and Naotaka were much unconfirmed due to very few historical primary sources of the story.) As the Asakura continued to presently retreat to their original stronghold, Naotaka lost his blade. After attempting to continue fighting bare-handed, he was killed together with his son.

Atsuta Shrine owns Tarō tachi (太郎太刀), a ōdachi with a blade length of 221 centimetres (87 in)) which is said to be the sword Naotaka used. The historical book Akechi Gunki (明智軍記) states that he used a ōdachi of 7 shaku 8 sun (237 centimetres (93 in)), and Asakura Shimatsuki (朝倉始末記) states that he used a ōdachi of about 9 shaku 5 sun (288 centimetres (113 in)).

== Appendix ==
=== Bibliography ===
- Turnbull, Stephen R. (2005). Warriors of Medieval Japan. Osprey. ISBN 1841768642.
- Masahare (18 Feb 2008). "Magara Naotaka". Shiro to Kosenjō (in Japanese). Archived from the original on 2008-12-26.
