= Niiro Tadamoto =

Vassal of the Satsuma daimyō (1526 – 1611)

- 新納 忠元
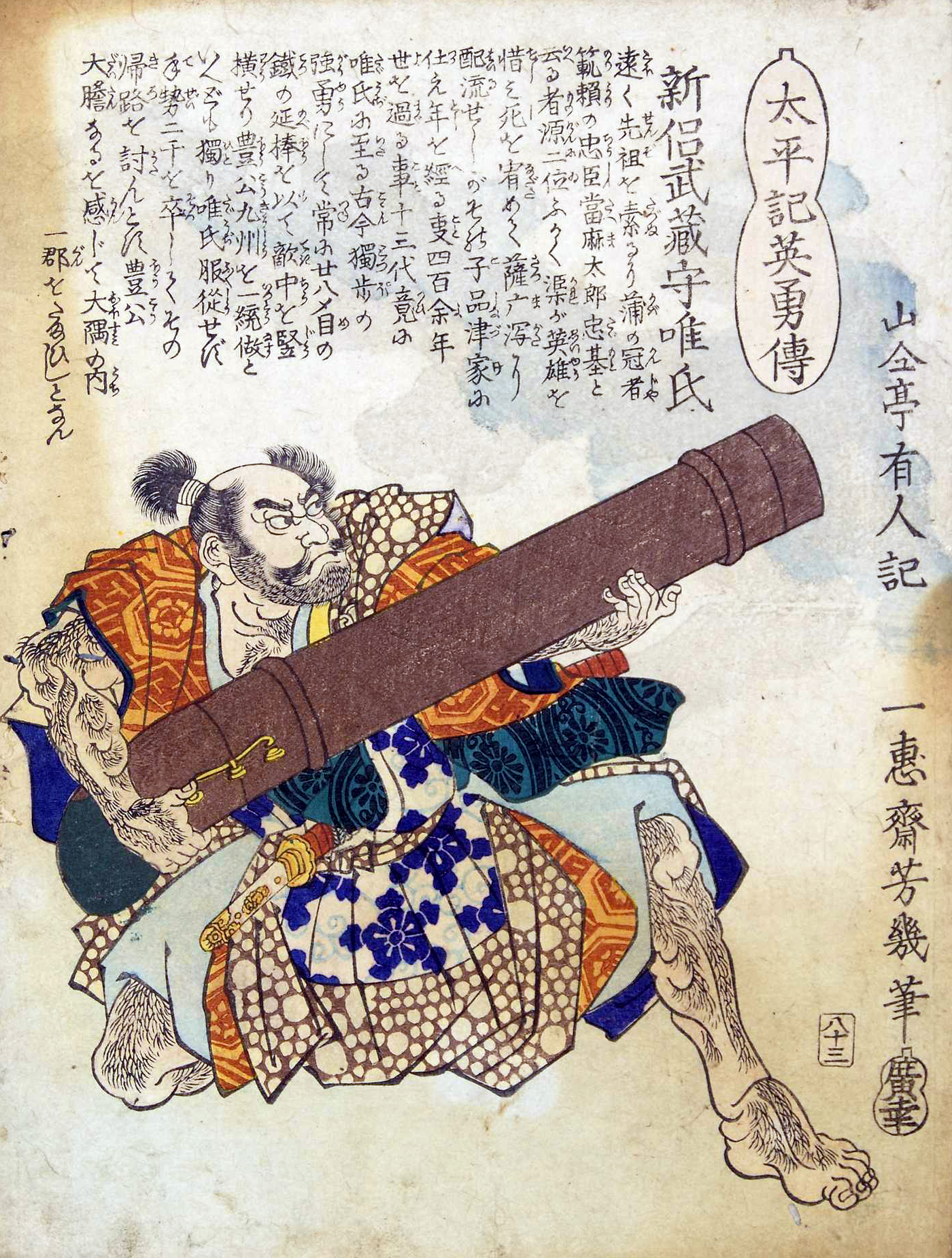
- Born: 1526
- Died: 16 January 1611 (aged 84)
- Military career
- Allegiance: Shimazu clan
- Nicknames: "Jiroshirō" "Oni Musashi"
- Conflicts: Battle of Kizaki (1572); Siege of Minamata (1581); Battle of Okitanawate (1584); Kyushu Campaign (1587)

Niiro Tadamoto (新納 忠元; 1526 – 16 January 1611) was a retainer of Satsuma daimyō Shimazu Yoshihisa. He is also known as Jiroshirō. He served under Shimazu Takahisa and then under Yoshihisa. Tadamoto was a skilled samurai called Oni Musashi.

Tadamoto had an active role at the Battle of Kizaki (1572), and, in 1574, became a hostage to compel the surrender of an enemy commander who had held-out in Ushine Castle for over one year. Tadamoto joined in the Siege of Minamata Castle (1581), and at the Battle of Okitanawate (1584). He was given Ōguchi region and was a commander of the Ōguchi Castle.

He also participated in the Kyushu Campaign against Toyotomi Hideyoshi. At the Battle of Sendaigawa, Niiro led his men in a charge against the Toyotomi force, and even engaged the famous warrior Katō Kiyomasa in personal combat before retreating under cover of night. He did not surrender to Hideyoshi until after the surrender of Shimazu Yoshihiro, the younger brother of Shimazu Yoshihisa.
