= Iino Castle =

Castle ruins in Mihara, Japan

- 飯野城
- Ebino, Miyazaki, Japan
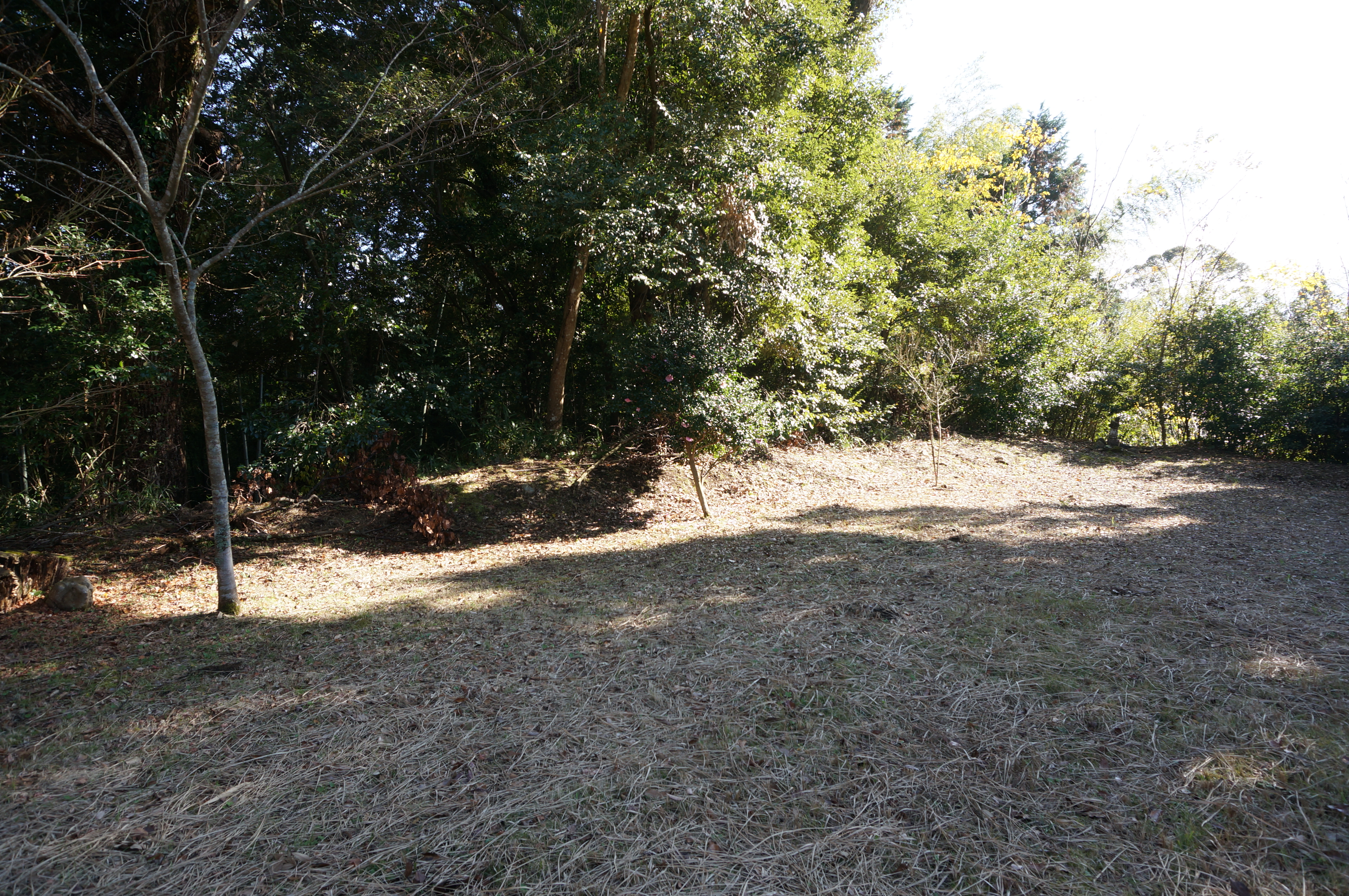
- Earthen wall of Honmaru compound

Site information
- Type: Hirayama castle
- Owner: Kitahara clan, Shimazu clan
- Condition: ruins

Site history
- Built: 11c
- Built by: Kusakabe clan
- Demolished: 1615

Garrison information
- Past commanders: Shimazu Yoshihiro, Shimazu Hisayasu

Iino Castle (飯野城, Iino-jō) also known as Kame-jiro was a castle structure in Ebino, Miyazaki, Japan. Iino Castle was built by the Kusakabe clan and was later controlled by the Shimazu clan.

Shimazu Yoshihiro became command of the castle and spent 26 years in the castle. He set out for Battle of Kizaki from the castle.

In 1590, Yoshihiro moved to Kurino Castle in Aira. The castle was demolished by Tokugawa shogunate's Law of One Castle per Province in 1615.

The castle is now only ruins, with some earthworks and moats. About 50 minutes walk from Ebino Iino Station.

== Gallery ==
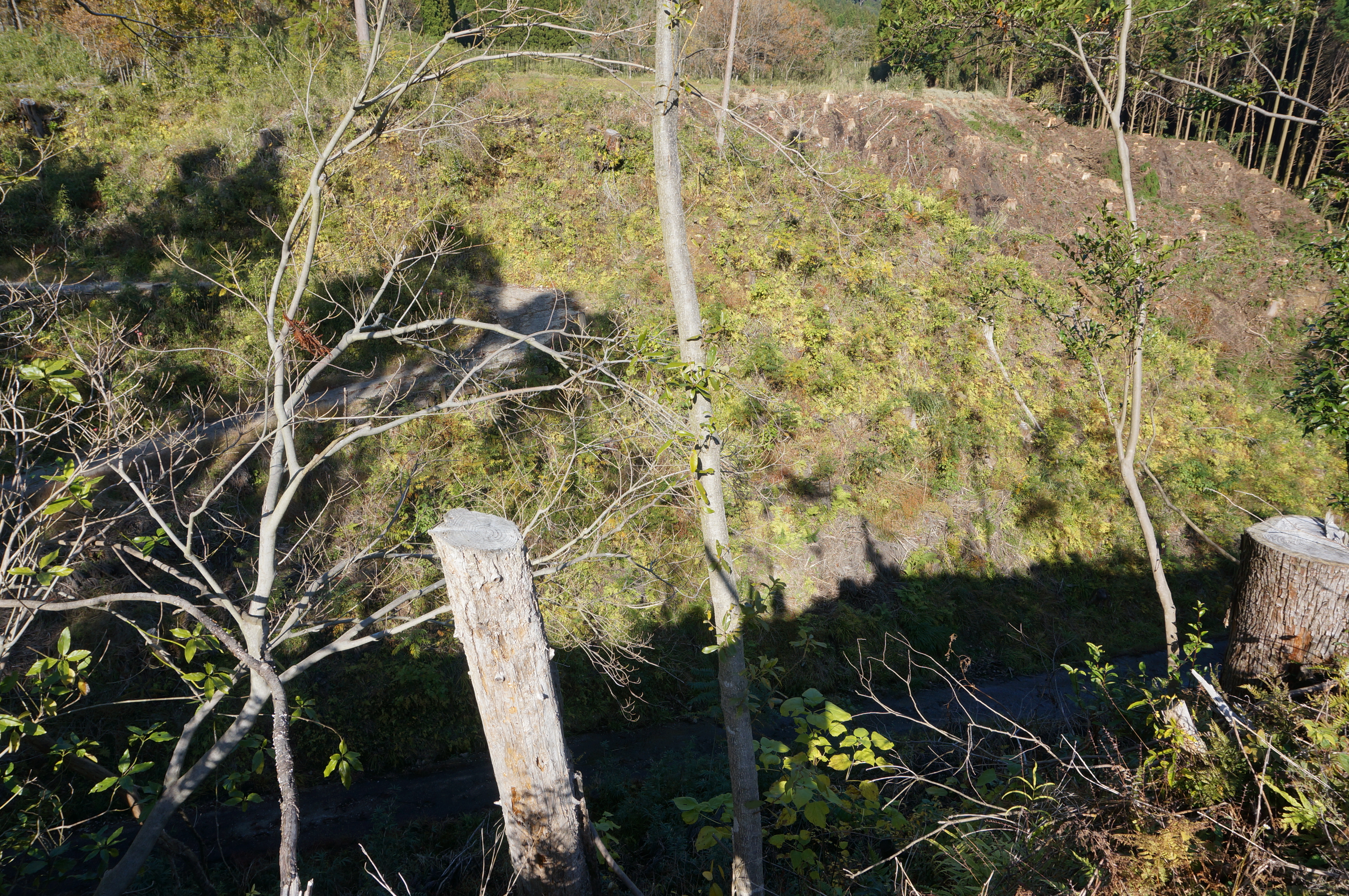
Dry moat of Sannomaru Compound

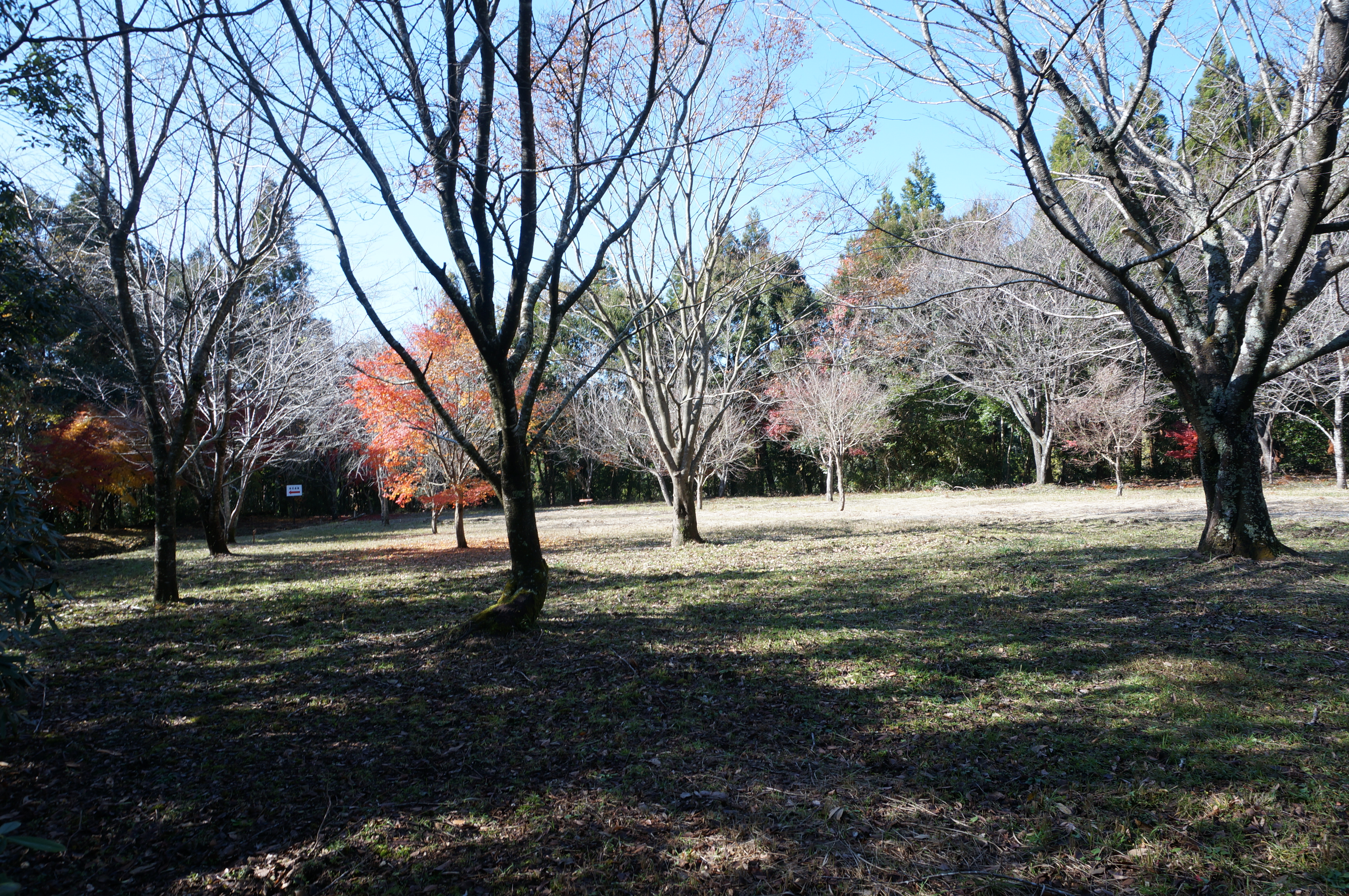
Honmaru of Iino Castle

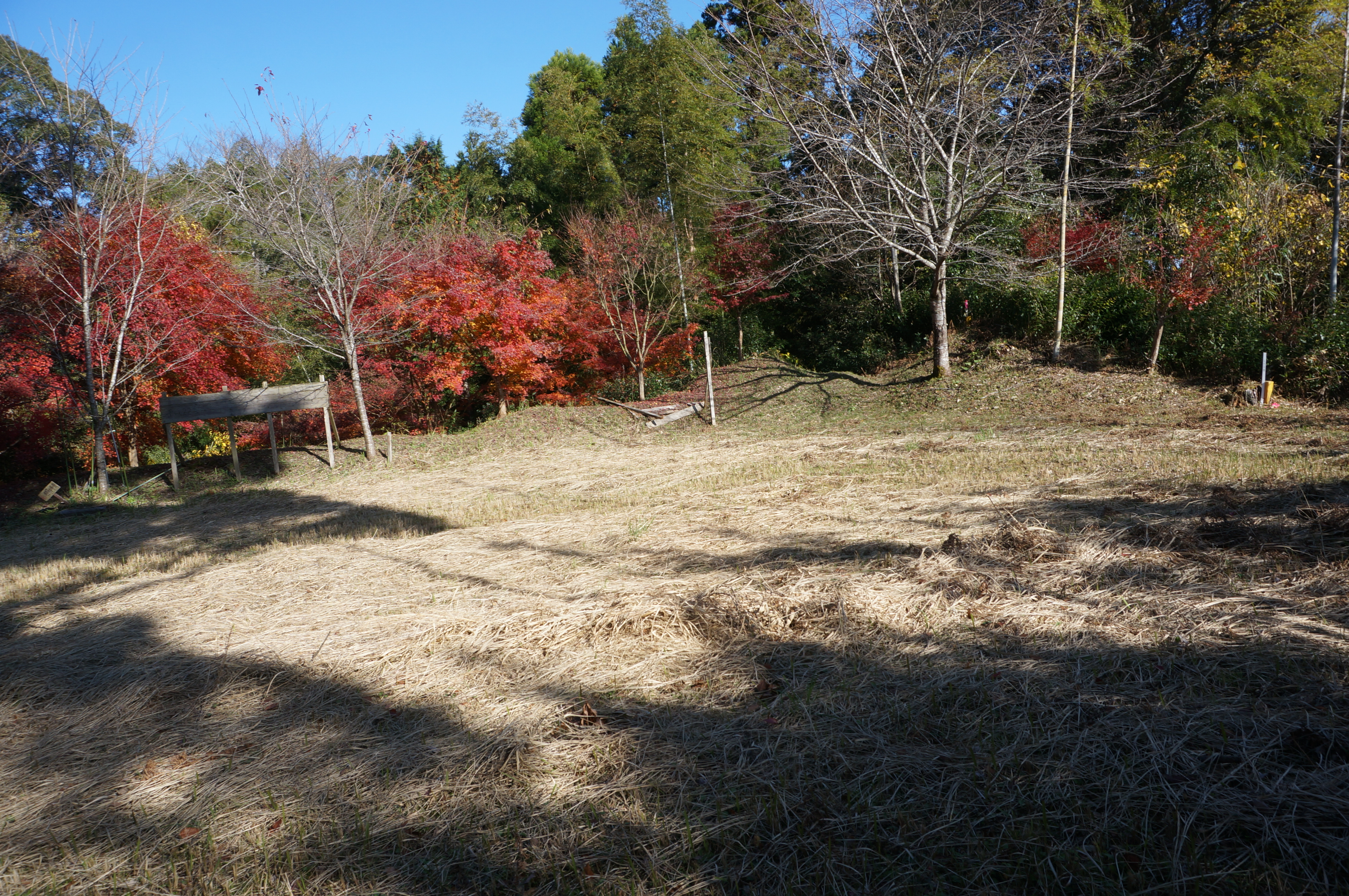
Eathen wall of Monomi compound
