= Nanao Castle =

- 七尾城
- Nanao, Ishikawa Prefecture, Japan
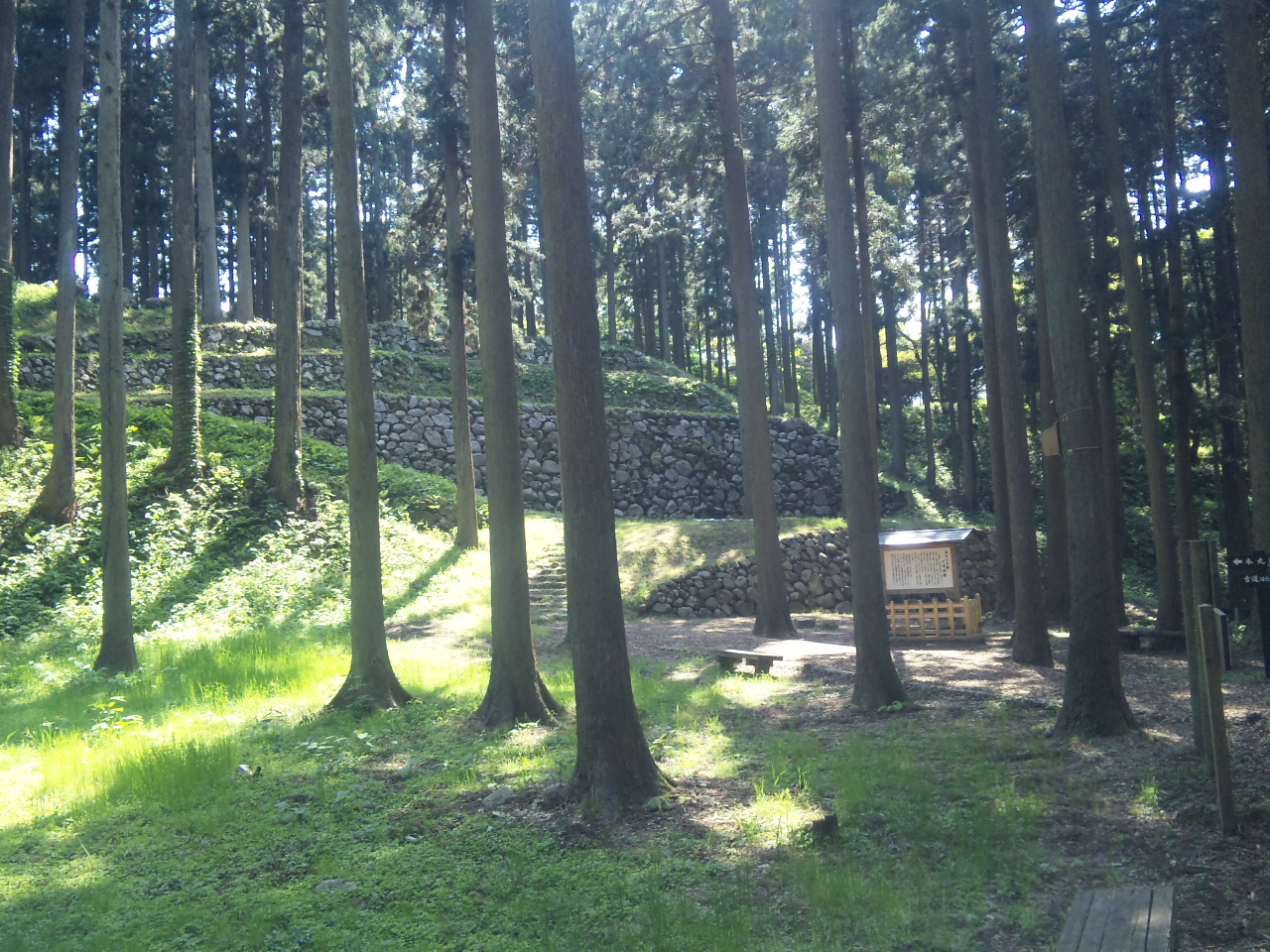
- Ruins of Nanao Castle

Site information
- Type: Yamajiro-style Japanese castle
- Open to the public: Yes
- Condition: Ruins

Location
- Coordinates: 37.0089°N 136.9841°E

Site history
- Built: c.1408
- Built by: Hatakeyama clan
- In use: Nanboku-Sengoku period
- Demolished: 1589
- Battles/wars: Siege of Nanao

Nanao Castle (七尾城, Nanao jō) was a Muromachi period yamajiro-style Japanese castle located in what is now the city of Nanao, Ishikawa Prefecture, in the Hokuriku region of Japan. Its ruins have been protected as a National Historic Site since 1934.

== Background ==
Nanao Castle is located on the southeastern side of Noto Peninsula facing the Sea of Japan. The area was important from the Nara period due to its good port and connections with neighbouring provinces. In 1408, Hatakeyama Mitsunori, from a branch line of the Hatakeyama clan, was appointed governor (shugo) of Noto Province and first constructed a castle at this location around the year 1408. Although the main Hatakeyama clan diminished in power and influence with the growing strength of the Ashikaga clan under the Muromachi shogunate, the Hatakeyama in Noto ruled their area as a semi-independent fief. Hatakeyama Yoshifusa (1491-1545) expanded Nanao Castle into a huge fortress. However, after his death, the Hatakeyama suffered from internal conflicts with the clan and with increasing restive powerful retainers, and problems with the Ikkō-ikki movement.

== Situation ==
Nanao Castle is regarded as one of the five largest medieval mountain castles in Japan along with Kasugayama Castle (Niigata Prefecture), Odani Castle and Kannonji Castle (Shiga Prefecture), and Gassantoda Castle (Shimane Prefecture). It is located along the upper slopes of Shiroyama mountain, a 300 meter height south edge of modern city center of Nanao and consisted of several enclosures, each with stone ramparts and dry moats. The central enclosure was at the top of the hill, and could only be reached by passing through the enclosures assigned to important vassals and retainers of the Hatakeyama, which completely surrounded the central enclosure on several concentric levels on the lower slopes. The total size of the fortifications exceeded one square kilometer.

== History ==
Uesugi Kenshin invaded Noto Province in 1576 just after conquering neighbouring Etchū Province. Kenshin first reduced the branch castles surrounding Nanao Castle in order to isolate the main castle and to protect his lines of communication; however, Nanao Castle proved to be too difficult to capture, and he was forced to retreat. He returned the following year, and laid siege to the castle again. Hatakeyama Yoshitaka appealed to Oda Nobunaga for assistance, but before Nobunaga could respond, Yoshitaka died under mysterious circumstances, possibly to an epidemic or assassination by poison. The defenders were demoralised, however one of Hatakeyama's chief retainers, Cho Tsunatsura resisted intensely. To counter such resistance, Kenshin succeeded in subverting another chief vassal, Yusa Tsugumitsu, who betrayed the Hatakeyama and opened the gates to Kenshin's forces. Having accepted Yusa's submission, Kenshin left Noto in his control but encountered and subsequently defeated the Oda relief force led by Shibata Katsuie at the Battle of Tedorigawa in 1577. After Kenshin died in 1578, Yusa surrendered to Nobunaga's forces when they conquered Noto Province in 1581. Having incurred Nobunaga's displeasure somehow, Yusa was murdered and Maeda Toshiie was appointed Lord of Noto in his stead. He built a new castle at Komaruyama (小丸山) and Nanao Castle was abandoned in 1589.

== Current ==
The castle is now only ruins, with some stone ramparts and baileys. A museum is on site.

== See also ==
- List of Historic Sites of Japan (Ishikawa)

== Literature ==
- Schmorleitz, Morton S. (1974). Castles in Japan. Tokyo: Charles E. Tuttle Co. pp. 144–145. ISBN 0-8048-1102-4.
- Motoo, Hinago (1986). Japanese Castles. Tokyo: Kodansha. p. 200 pages. ISBN 0-87011-766-1.
- Mitchelhill, Jennifer (2004). Castles of the Samurai: Power and Beauty. Tokyo: Kodansha. p. 112 pages. ISBN 4-7700-2954-3.
- Turnbull, Stephen (2003). Japanese Castles 1540-1640. Osprey Publishing. p. 64 pages. ISBN 1-84176-429-9.
