= Kumagai Nobunao =

Japanese samurai

- 熊谷 信直
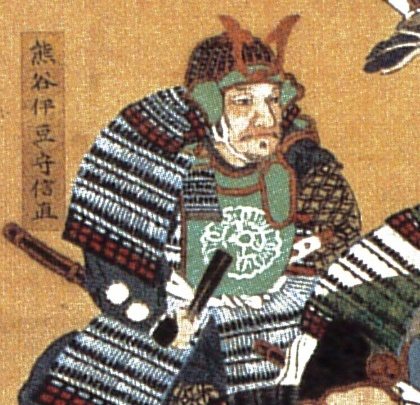
- Kumagai Nobunao
- Born: 1507; Aki Province
- Died: 1593 (aged 85–86); Kumagaya-shi Yakata
- Military career
- Commands: Miiri-Takamatsu Castle
- Conflicts: Siege of Yoshida-Kōriyama Castle, Battle of Miyajima

Kumagai Nobunao (熊谷 信直; 1507 – 1593) was a Japanese samurai and commander of the Sengoku period. Nobunao an Kumagai clan's ancestor was Kumagai Naozane. He initially served the Aki Takeda clan, but he left Takeda clan and became a vassal of the Mōri Motonari. He moved Kumagai clan's main bastion from Isegatsubo Castle to Miiri-Takamatsu Castle.

In 1547, His daughter was married to Motonari's son Kikkawa Motoharu. Thus, Kumagai clan became an important servant of the Mōri clan.
