= Siege of Nanao =

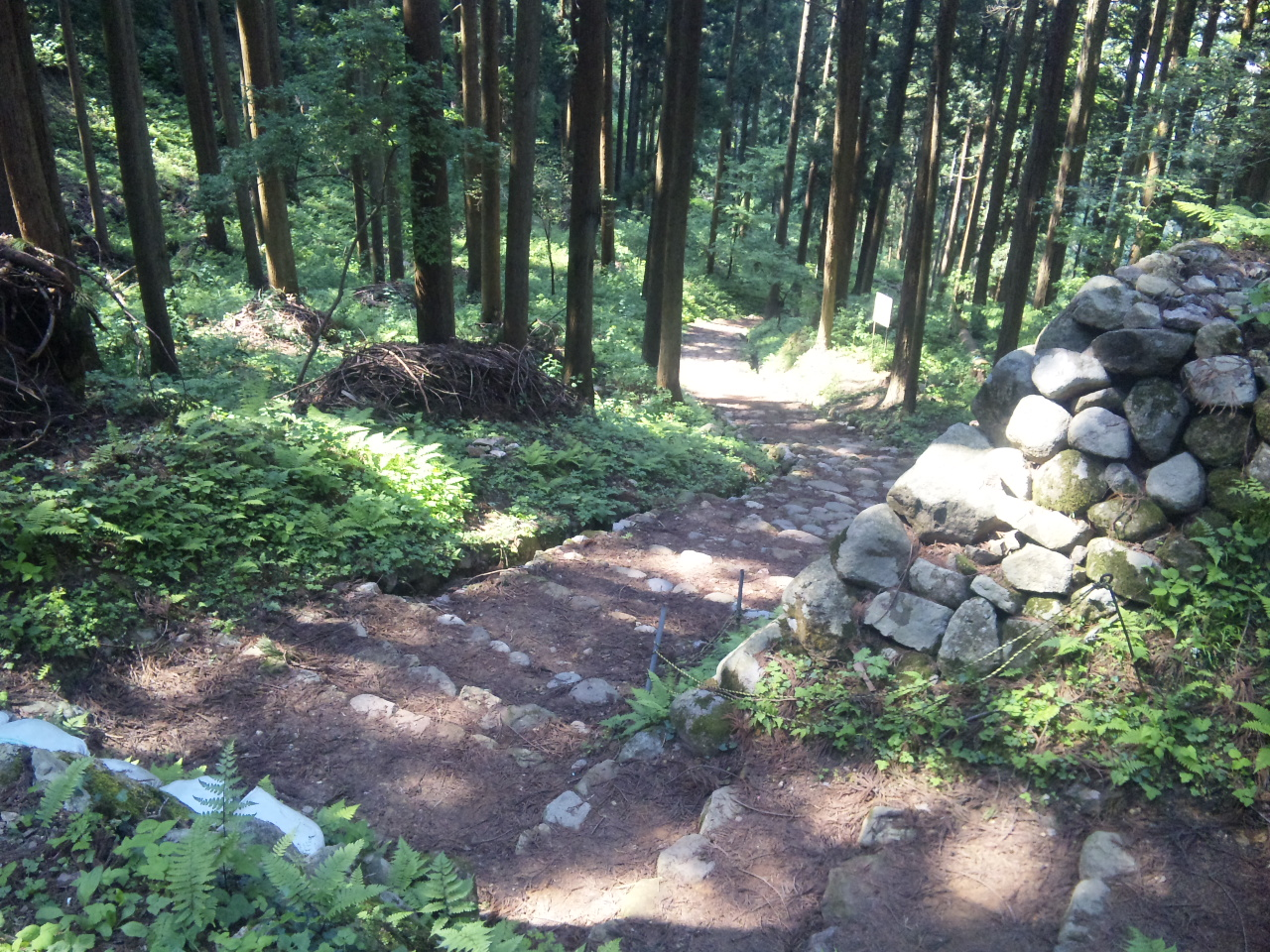
- Nanao Castle
Date	1576–1577
Location	Nanao Castle, Noto province 37°00′33″N 136°59′03″E
Result	Uesugi victory
Territorial changes	Nanao falls to Uesugi Kenshin

Belligerents
Forces of Uesugi Kenshin	Hatakeyama clan forces

Commanders and leaders
Uesugi Kenshin	Chō Tsugutsura †

Strength
20,000 soldiers	15,000 (soldiers and civilians)
- Location within Ishikawa Prefecture Siege of Nanao (Japan)

The siege of Nanao was one of many sieges undertaken by Uesugi Kenshin, an Uesugi clan daimyō of Japan's Sengoku period. The castle of Nanao, which was under possession by Hatakeyama Haruōmaru.

== Background ==
In 1574, Hatakeyama Yoshinori met an untimely death. he was assassinated by retainers Yusa Tsugumitsu and Nukui Kagetaka. Later, Yoshinori was succeeded by his younger brother, Hatakeyama Yoshitaka, but died in 1576. In the end, Yoshitaka's young son, Hatakeyama Haruōmaru, was backed as his successor, but the real authority was held by a senior retainer, Chō Tsugutsura. In order to promote stability in Noto, Kenshin appoint Jōjō Masashige as the next head of the Hatakeyama clan who had earlier been tendered by the Hatakeyama as hostage. The members of the Noto-Hatakeyama clan resented Kenshin intervention in their affairs by making clear an intention for a showdown against Uesugi.

== First Siege (1576) ==
In 1576, Uesugi Kenshin led 20,000 troops to invade Etchu and to capture Nanao Castle. Chō Tsugutsura, the head of retainers at Nanao Castle, with 2,000 soldiers, committed to defend the castle. But Kenshin did not attack the Nanao castle, but turned his attack toward outlying castles that served as its support to isolate the castle. Nevertheless, Tsugutsura refused to surrender from the stronghold.

== Second Siege (1577) ==
In 1577, after Kenshin reduced the outlying fortresses that supported the castle of Nanao, he beginning a second siege. At this time, Tsugutsura called upon all of the residents to engage in a war of resistance. As results, nearly 15,000 soldiers and civilians amassed at the castle.

The castle held out until autumn, by which time Tsugutsura had sent a message to Oda Nobunaga in order to seek his assistance. Before Nobunaga had time to respond, however, the castle fell. This was caused partly by disease among the garrison, which ended up claiming the life of even Hatakeyama Haruōmaru himself. Yusa Tsugumitsu killed Chō Tsugutsura and opened the Castle gates for Kenshin, also contributing heavily to the castle's fall. and resulted in the Hatakeyama of Noto switching allegiance to the Uesugi clan.
