= Naruyuki Hatakeyama =

Japanese professional shogi player

- Native name: 畠山成幸
- Born: June 3, 1969 (age 57)
- Hometown: Kanagawa Prefecture
- Nationality: Japanese

Career
- Achieved professional status: October 1, 1989 (aged 20)
- Badge number: 193
- Rank: 8-dan
- Teacher: Masayuki Moriyasu (7-dan)
- Tournaments won: 1
- Meijin class: C2
- Ryūō class: 6

Websites
- JSA profile page

Naruyuki Hatakeyama (畠山 成幸, Hatakeyama Naruyuki; June 3, 1969) is a Japanese professional shogi player ranked 8-dan.

== Shogi professional ==
=== Promotion history ===
Hatakeyama's promotion history is as follows:

- 6-kyū: 1983
- 1-dan: 1986
- 4-dan: October 1, 1989
- 5-dan: April 1, 1993
- 6-dan: April 1, 1996
- 7-dan: May 19, 2003
- 8-dan: March 8, 2017

=== Titles and other championships ===
Hatakeyama has won one non-major-title championship during his career. He defeated Tadahisa Maruyama to win the Quick Play Young Professionals Tournament in 1994.

=== Awards and honors ===
In 2014, Hatakeyama received the Japan Shogi Association's "25 Years Service Award" for being an active professional for twenty-five years.

== Personal life ==
Hatakeyama's twin brother Mamoru is also a professional shogi player. They are the only twins to become professional in history and both became (4-dan) professionals on the same day.
