= Yasumi Naomasa =

Military commander in Feudal Japan

- Died: 1572
- Occupation: Military Commander

Yasumi Naomasa (安見 直政; ? – 1572) was a military commander in the Azuchi-Momoyama period. A dominant retainer of Hatakeyama clan, he ruled Katano and Iimoriyama castles.

He conspired with Yusa Naganori and Yusa Nobunori to overthrow his lord. He then approached Oda Nobunaga after falling out with Nobunori and served Nobunaga to guarantee his own safety.
