= Hatakeyama Yoshitaka =

Japanese daimyō

Hatakeyama Yoshitaka (畠山 義隆 died 1576) was a Japanese daimyō of the Sengoku period, who was head of the Hatakeyama of Noto Province.

Some sources state that he lived up until 1577, committing suicide after Uesugi Kenshin had besieged Nanao Castle.
