= Igawa Mitsunobu =

Japanese samurai

Igawa Mitsunobu (飯川 光誠) was a Japanese samurai of the Sengoku period, who served the Hatakeyama clan of Noto province. In 1551, when the chief retainers of the Hatakeyama had forced Hatakeyama Yoshitsugu to retire in favor of his son, Yoshitsuna, Mitsunobu emerged as an ally of both. In 1555, the Hatakeyama had restored their authority to some extent, thanks to Mitsunobu's work as an administrator. He became a monk in 1572, taking the name Wakasa nyūdō Sōgen (若狭入道宗玄). Beyond this, the rest of his life remains obscure.
