= Hatakeyama Yoshifusa =

Hatakeyama Yoshifusa (畠山 義総) (1491–1545) was the successor of Hatakeyama Yoshimoto. This succession took place during the year 1515. For Yoshifusa to consolidate his power, he reinforced Nanao Castle and established himself there . Yoshifusa was a patron to scholars, and invited various scholars from Kyoto to lecture at Nanao. Yoshifusa was indeed a very capable leader. The Noto Hatakeyama enjoyed relative peace and stability as Yoshifusa was under their rule.
