= List of dams in Miyazaki Prefecture =

The following is a list of dams in Miyazaki Prefecture, Japan.

== List ==
Name	Location	Opened	Height (meters)	Image
Ayakita Dam		1960	75.3	
Ayaminami Dam		1958	64	
Dogawa Dam			62.5	
Hamago Dam			42.7	
Hamanose Dam		2014	62.5	
Hase Dam		1981	65	
Higashibaru Choseichi Dam		1980	21	
Hirosawa Dam			62.7	
Hiroto Dam			66	
Hitotsuse Dam		1963	130	
Horigawa Dam				
Hoshiyama Dam		1942	30.5	
Ishikawauchi Dam		2007	47.5	
Iwase Dam		1967	55.5	
Iwayato Dam		1941	57.5	
Kadogawa Bosai Dam		1972	31	
Kamishiiba Dam		1955	110	
Kanasumi Dam		2007	42.5	
Kawabaru Dam		1939	23.6	
Kiribaru Dam		2012	61.3	
Koganekyo Dam		1958	32	
Konokawauchi Dam		2009	64.3	
Kuwanouchi Dam		1955	26.5	
Madonose Dam				
Matsuo Dam			68	
Miyanomoto Dam			18.5	
Morozuka Dam		1960	59	
Nichinan Dam			47	
Nishihata Dam			17.8	
Okita Dam			36	
Oseuchi Dam			65.5	
Ouchibaro Dam			25.5	
Oyodogawa No.1 Dam			47	
Oyodogawa No.2 Dam				
Sabukawa Dam			33.5	
Saigo Dam				
Shimoaka Dam			17.8	
Sugiyasu Dam			39.5	
Tachibana Dam			71.3	
Takaoka Dam			38.9	
Tashirohae Dam			64.6	
Tenjin Dam			62.5	
Torinosu Dam				
Tosaki Dam				
Tsukabaru Dam		1993	87	
Urita Dam			42	
Ushiyama Dam				
Yamase Dam				
Yamasubaru Dam				
Yanagihara Dam				

== See also ==
- Media related to Dams in Miyazaki prefecture at Wikimedia Commons
