= Tsukabaru Dam =

Dam in Miyazaki Prefecture, Japan

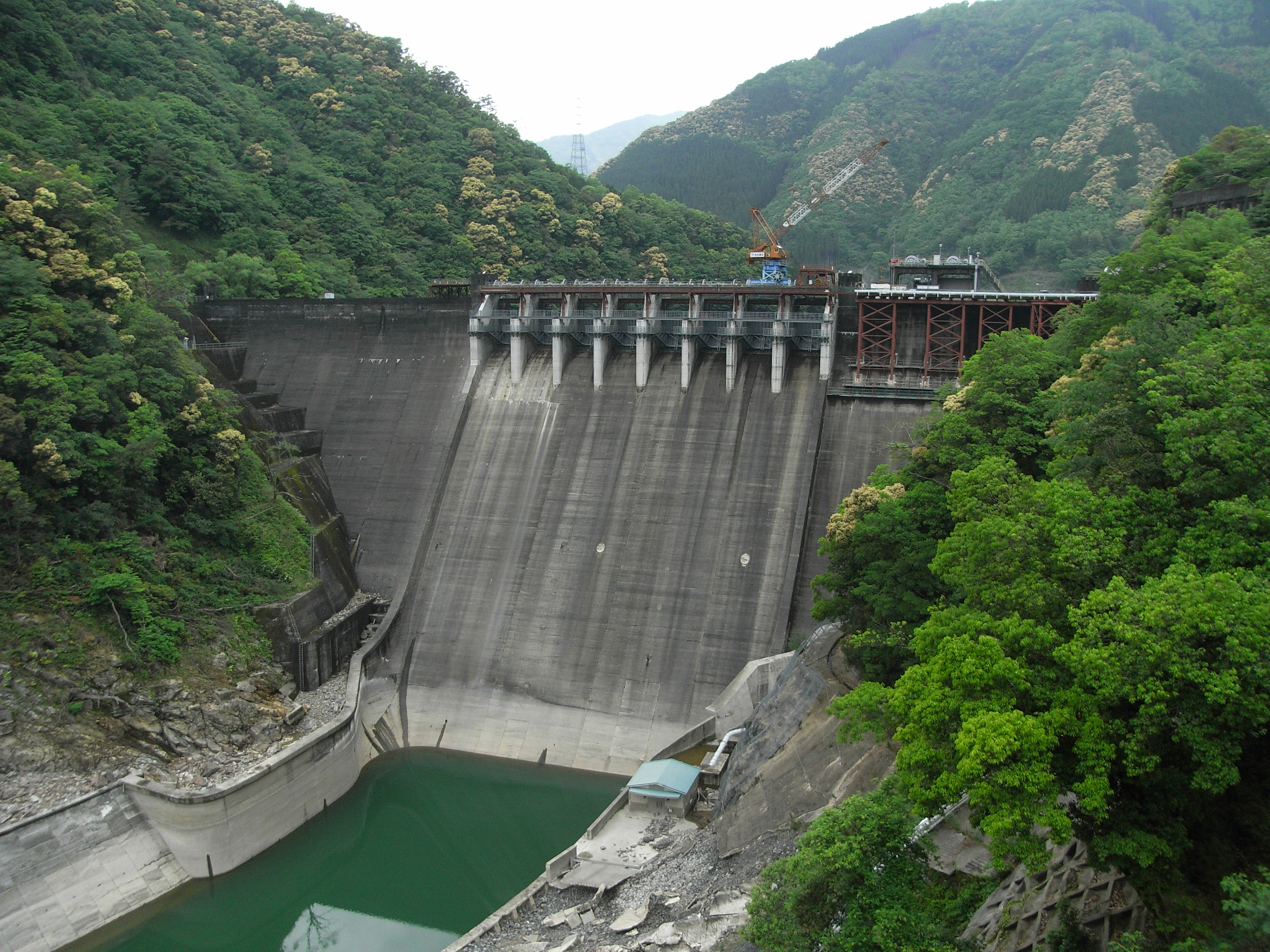
- Interactive map of Tsukabaru Dam
- Location: Miyazaki Prefecture, Japan
- Coordinates: 32.5052°N 131.3000°E
- Construction began: 1938
- Opening date: 1993
- Owner: Kyushu Electric Power Co. Ltd

Dam and spillways
- Type of dam: Concrete gravity masonry
- Impounds: Mimi River
- Height: 87 metres (285 ft)
- Length: 215 metres (705 ft)

Reservoir
- Creates: 34,326,000 m^{3}
- Total capacity: 19,555,000 m^{3}
- Catchment area: 410.6 square kilometres (158.5 sq mi)
- Surface area: 114 hectares (280 acres)

Power Station
- Operator: Kyushu Electric Power Co. Ltd
- Annual generation: 113,000 MWh

Tsukabaru Dam (Japanese: 塚原ダム) is a concrete gravity dam built on the Mimi River for hydro-electric power generation in the Miyazaki Prefecture in Japan. The dam, built by the Kyushu Electric Power Co, Ltd. in 1938, was commissioned only in 1993. When built to a height of 87 m (285 ft) it was the highest gravity type dam in Japan, only to be surpassed later by the Kamishiba Dam raised in the uppermost reaches of the Mimi River.

== Geography ==
The dam is located on the Mimi River which rises in the Kyushu mountain range. The river flows through a gorge section. The catchment area drained at the dam site is 410.6 km^{2} (158.5 sq mi) and is highly forested to the extent of 95%, whereas the agricultural area is only 1%. The river catchment lies in a temperate climatic zone. There is cascade of six dams built on the river with two dams in the upstream basin of the Tsukabaru Dam and three dams (Yamasubaru Dam, Saigo Dam, and Ouchibaro Dam) downstream of it. The uppermost dam is the Kamishiba Dam, the first arch dam in Japan which is the largest on the river followed by the Iwayado Dam.

== Features ==
Tsukabaru Dam, a concrete masonry gravity dam is 87 m (285 ft) in height and has a length of 215 m (705 ft) at the crest. The gross storage of the reservoir created by the dam is 34,326,000 m^{3} and the live storage is 19,555,000 m^{3}. The reservoir has a water spread of 114 hectares (280 acres) and has an average depth of 26 m (85 ft). The bridge over the dam has a particular design of its railing, and the identical turrets on both flanks of the dam give it an appearance of a medieval European castle or the Great Wall of China.

In 2001, the dam was given the Early-Modern Civil Engineering heritage status by the Japan Society of Civil Engineering. In March 2004, the dam and Balgo and Morotsuka villages have been included in the List of Japan’s Registered Tangible Cultural Properties (Buildings). This inclusion was partly because of the heritage status as the first masonry gravity dam built in 1938, with unique features on the top of the dam, and the mechanized method of construction used for the first time.

Energy generation from the hydroelectric power plant at the Tsukabaru Dam, operated by the Kyushu Electric Power Co., was 135,042 MWh in 2000, and the present and projected generation is 113,000 MWh.

The Kyushu Electric Power Co., Inc. has assured that "it will maintain dam as a tourist resource and educational tool in cooperation with local governments."

== Disaster management ==
Typhoons in the upper region of the Mimi River basin have caused extensive debris of deadwood accumulation behind the Tsukabaru Dam and the two other on the upstream, which were flushed through the spillway structures of each dam. There were also large landslides in the vicinity of the dam requiring urgent attention to prevent vitiation of the storage behind the Tsukabaru Dam. Between August and September 2005, a temporary dam was created about 500 m (1,600 ft) downstream of the dam due to landslides. The amount of sediment deposited (including trees) was estimated at 3,250,000 m^{3}. An unusually high annual precipitation of 1000 mm has been recorded in recent years in the Kyushu region and assigned to climate change.

== Algal infestation and water quality ==
Red tide algal blooms (blooms of single-celled algae) known as the Peridinium bipes, noticed to proliferate intensely at the Tsukabaru reservoir from the later part of the 1970s, is a serious environmental problem that has received due attention of the agency involved with the project. It is inferred that the algal development is not on account of eutrophication or unusual growth of plankton but is on account of accumulation of stable cyst on the surface of the reservoir caused due to the process of phototaxis at the inlet end of the reservoir and spread to cover the reservoir surface completely. Its annual occurrence was noted since 1990. This process created extensive cultivation of Peridinium bipes of dinoflagellate, which generated a foul smell and discolored the water surface area thus marring the scenic beauty of the reservoir. This necessitated instituting measures to eradicate the problem. Various alternative treatments were examined, such as cyclic aeration, treatment after collection, use of ozone and ultraviolet irradiation; the ultraviolet irradiation method has been chosen and put into practice. For this purpose a river craft was developed and named as "Red tide treatment ship". With the automated process operated from the ship, the red tides are eliminated almost completely using ultraviolet (UV) irradiation.

The irradiation process adopted involves pumping of surface water through irradiation chambers fitted on the boat, removal of organic material such as litter of leaves, and then subjecting the water surface to the UV irradiation. A nephelometer installed at the treatment facility provides feedback on the bloom density for adjustment of exposure time to UV radiation. The entire process takes about 5 hours and a success rate of 99% removal of the algae is reported, killing all cells over an initial treatment of two days. Unlike other methods of treatment, no chemical contamination is produced in the UV radiation process.
