= Tenjin =

Tenjin may be:

== Places ==
- Tenjin Beach, a recreational beach on Lake Inawashiro in Fukushima Prefecture, Japan
- Tenjin Dam, a rockfill dam located in Miyazaki Prefecture in Japan
- Tenjin, Fukuoka, Japan, the downtown region of the city
  - Tenjin Station, a subway station
  - Tenjin-Minami Station, a subway station
- Tenjin River, in Tottori Prefecture, Japan
- Tenjin Shin'yō-ryū, a traditional school (koryū) of jūjutsu
- Tenjin zaka, is a name used for several places in Japan

== People ==
- Hidetaka Tenjin (天神 英貴; born 1973), Japanese mecha anime artist and science-fiction illustrator
- Umi Tenjin (天神 有海), Japanese voice actress

== See also ==
- Tenjin (kami), the Shinto kami (spirit) of scholarship
  - Tenjin Matsuri, a festival held throughout Japan honouring the Shinto kami
- Tenjin no Honji, Japanese otogi-zōshi in two scrolls
