= Tozaki Dam =

Dam in Miyazaki Prefecture, Japan

- Location within Japan
- Official name: 戸崎ダム
- Location: Miyazaki Prefecture, Japan
- Coordinates: 32°14′59″N 131°23′02″E
- Construction began: 1939
- Opening date: 1943

Dam and spillways
- Height: 25 m (82 ft)
- Length: 115 m (377 ft)

Reservoir
- Total capacity: 544,000 m^{3} (19,200,000 cu ft)
- Catchment area: 324.3 km^{2} (125.2 sq mi)
- Surface area: 16 hectares (40 acres)

Tozaki Dam (Japanese: 戸崎ダム) is a gravity dam located in Miyazaki Prefecture in Japan. The dam is used for power production. The catchment area of the dam is 324.3 km^{2}. The dam impounds about 16 ha of land when full and can store 544 thousand cubic meters of water. The construction of the dam was started on 1939 and completed in 1943.

== See also ==
- List of dams in Japan
- List of dams in Miyazaki Prefecture
