= Hase Dam =

Hase Dam may refer to:

- Hase Dam (Hyōgo)
- Hase Dam (Miyazaki)
