= Seiroku Tameike Dam =

Dam in Miyazaki Prefecture, Japan

Seiroku Tameike
- Location within Japan
- Official name: 青鹿溜池
- Location: Miyazaki Prefecture, Japan
- Coordinates: 32°13′26″N 131°28′57″E
- Opening date: 1959

Dam and spillways
- Height: 31.3 m (103 ft)
- Length: 140 m (460 ft)

Reservoir
- Total capacity: 907,000 m^{3} (32,000,000 cu ft)
- Catchment area: 4.9 km^{2} (1.9 sq mi)
- Surface area: 9 hectares (22 acres)

Seiroku Tameike (Japanese: 青鹿溜池) is an earthfill dam located in Miyazaki Prefecture in Japan. The dam is used for irrigation. The catchment area of the dam is 4.9 km^{2}. The dam impounds about 9 ha of land when full and can store 907 thousand cubic meters of water. The construction of the dam was completed in 1959.

== See also ==
- List of dams in Japan
- List of dams in Miyazaki Prefecture
