= Hitotsuse Dam =

Coordinates: 32°12′24.5″N 131°18′6.7″E

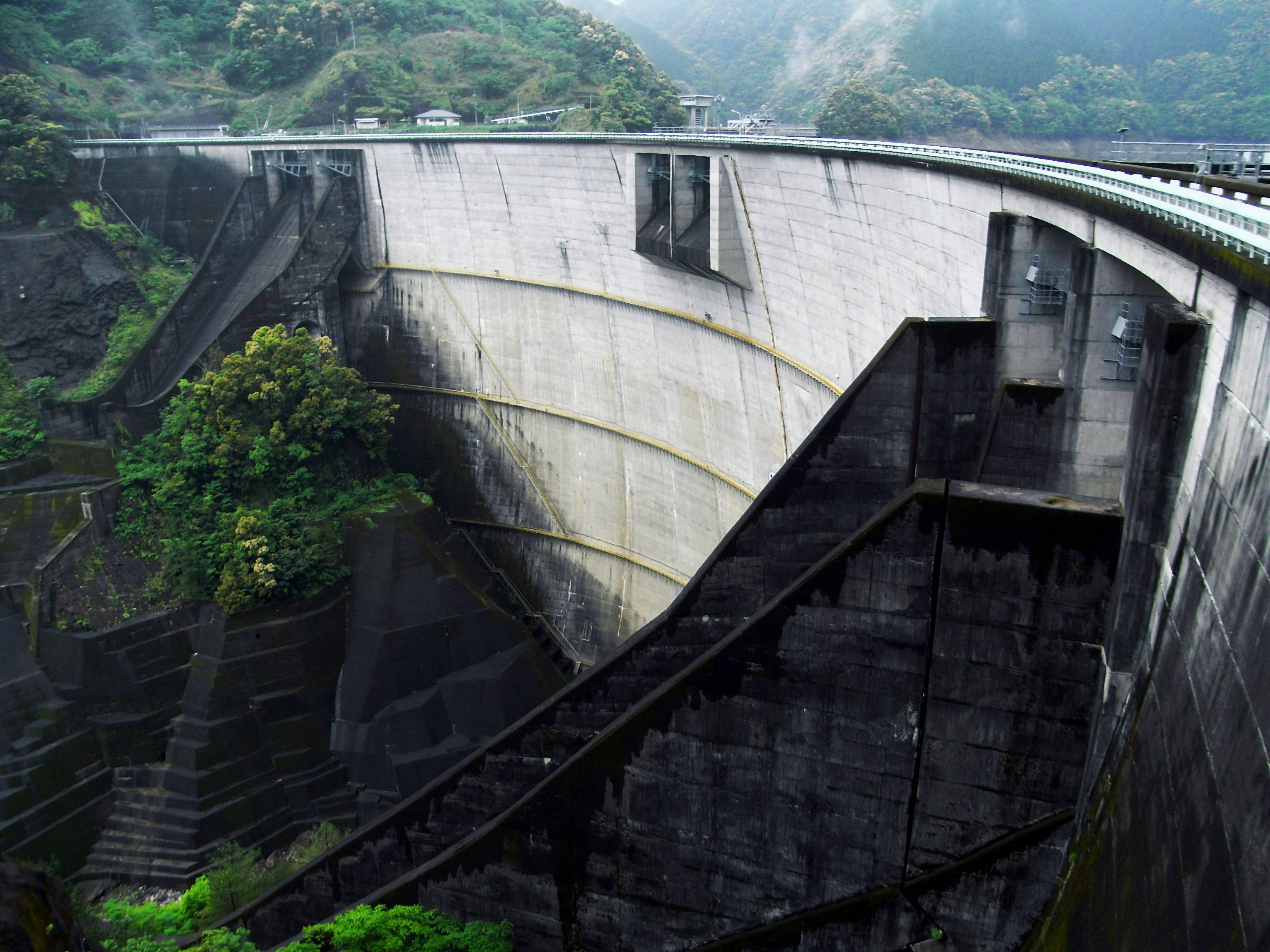
- Interactive map of Hitotsuse Dam
- Location: Saito, Miyazaki, Japan
- Construction began: 1960
- Opening date: 1963

Dam and spillways
- Type of dam: Concrete arch dam
- Impounds: Hitotsuse River
- Height: 130 m (430 ft)
- Length: 415.6 m (1,364 ft)
- Dam volume: 555,000 m^{3}

Reservoir
- Creates: Mera Reservoir
- Total capacity: 261,315,000 m^{3}
- Catchment area: 445 km^{2}
- Surface area: 686 ha

Hitotsuse Dam (一ツ瀬ダム, Hitotsuse damu) is a dam in Saito, Miyazaki Prefecture, Japan, completed in 1963.

Many roads, schools, houses, and farmland were submerged in the construction.
