= Mimi River (Japan) =

River in Miyazaki Prefecture, Japan

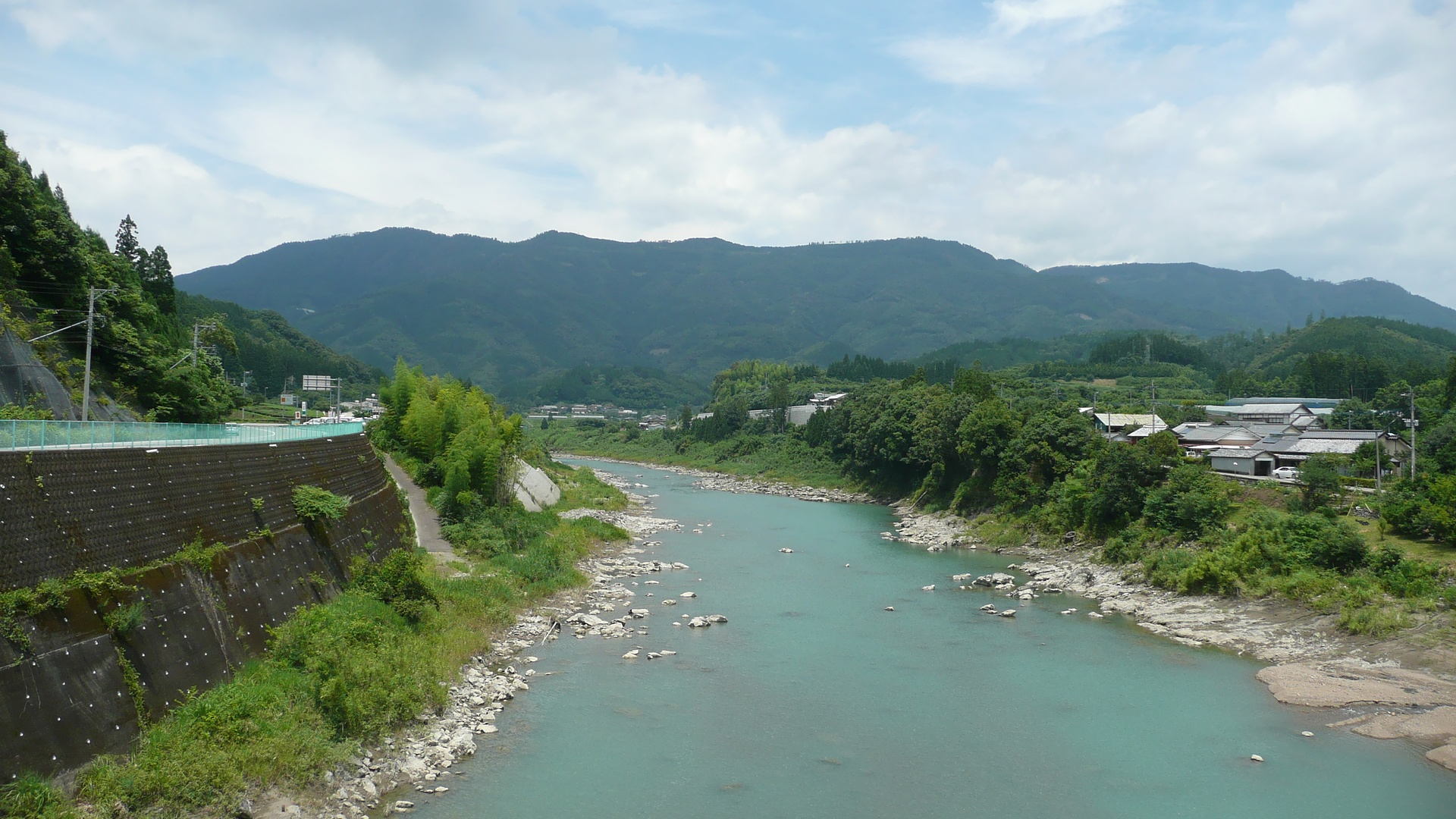
- Mimi River as it passes through Misato Town, Miyazaki Prefecture

Mimi River is a river of Japan. It flows through the Miyazaki Prefecture. There is cascade of six dams built on the river with two dams in the upstream basin of the Tsukabaru Dam and three dams (Yamasubaru Dam, Saigo Dam, and Ouchibaro Dam) on the downstream.
