= Nichinan Dam =

Dam in Miyazaki Prefecture, Japan

- Location within Japan
- Official name: 日南ダム
- Location: Miyazaki Prefecture, Japan
- Coordinates: 31°38′27″N 131°16′25″E
- Construction began: 1968
- Opening date: 1984

Dam and spillways
- Height: 47 m (154 ft)
- Length: 189 m (620 ft)

Reservoir
- Total capacity: 6000 thousand cubic meters
- Catchment area: 59.2 sq. km
- Surface area: 41 hectares

Nichinan Dam (Japanese: 日南ダム) is a gravity dam located in Miyazaki Prefecture in Japan. The dam is used for flood control. The catchment area of the dam is 59.2 km^{2}. The dam impounds about 41 ha of land when full and can store 6000 thousand cubic meters of water. The construction of the dam was started on 1968 and completed in 1984.

== See also ==
- List of dams in Japan
