= Ishikawauchi Dam =

Coordinates: 32°14′29″N 131°23′25″E

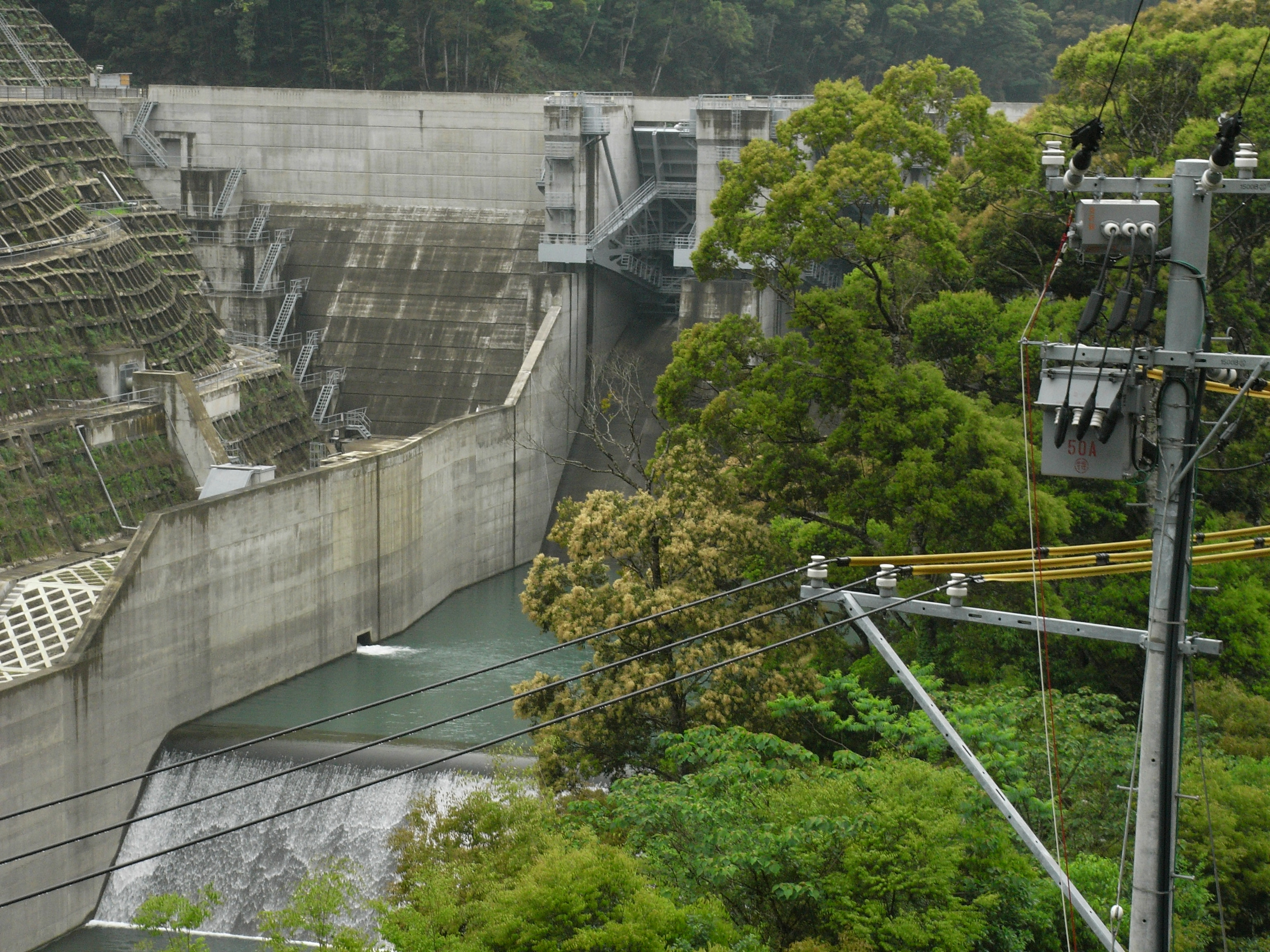
- Interactive map of Ishikawauchi Dam
- Location: Kijō, Miyazaki, Japan
- Construction began: 1997
- Opening date: 2007

Dam and spillways
- Height: 47.5 m (156 ft)
- Length: 185 m (607 ft)
- Dam volume: 134,000 m^{3}

Reservoir
- Total capacity: 6,9000,000 m^{3}
- Catchment area: 329 km^{2}
- Surface area: 41 ha

Ishikawauchi Dam (石河内ダム, Ishikawauchi damu) is a dam in Kijō, Miyazaki Prefecture, Japan, completed in 2007.
