= Tashirobae Dam =

Dam in Miyazaki Prefecture, Japan

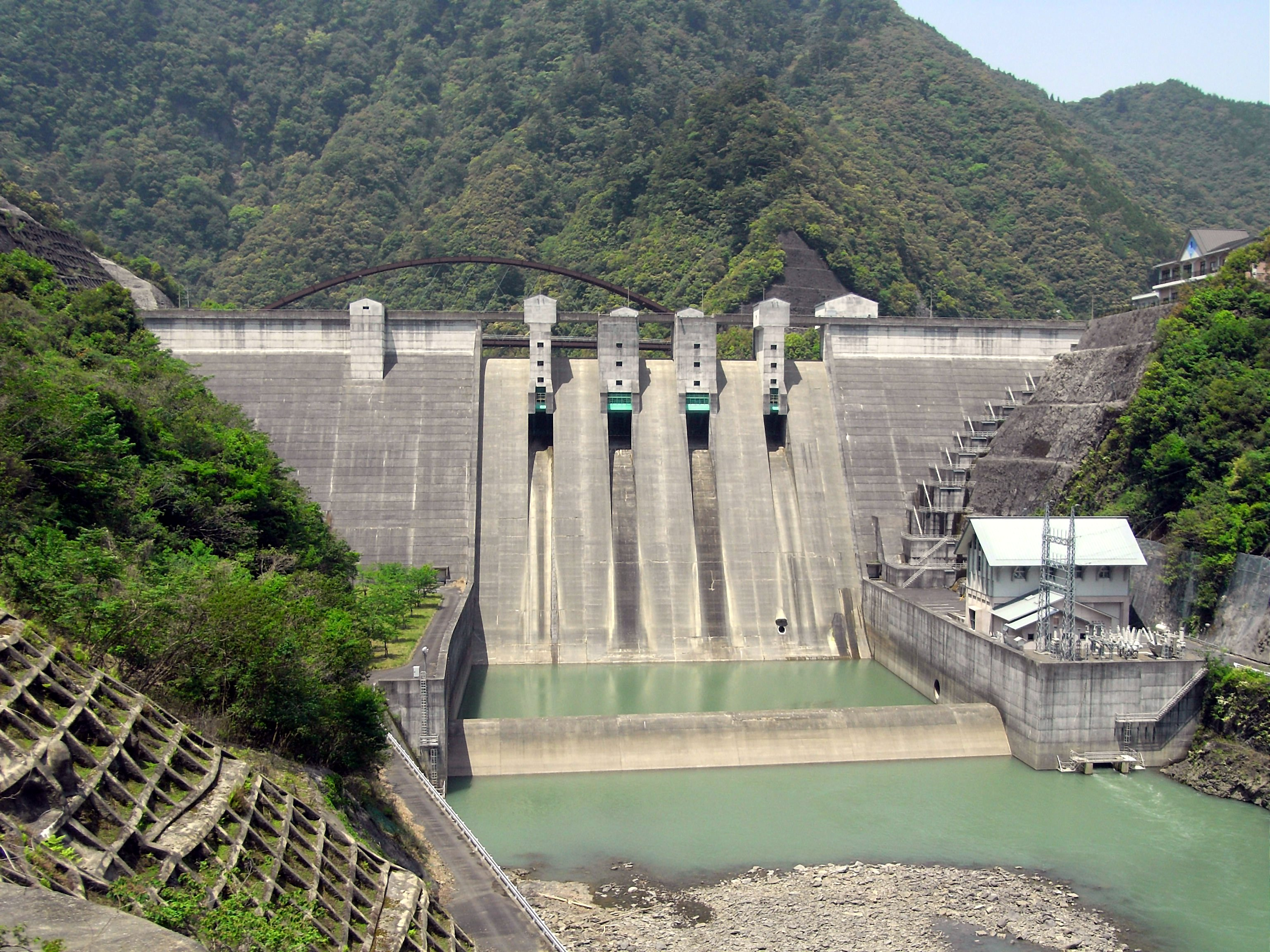

- Location within Japan
- Official name: 田代八重ダム
- Location: Miyazaki Prefecture, Japan
- Coordinates: 32°8′09″N 131°7′20″E
- Construction began: 1971
- Opening date: 1999

Dam and spillways
- Height: 64.6 m (212 ft)
- Length: 216 m (709 ft)

Reservoir
- Total capacity: 19,270,000 m^{3} (681,000,000 cu ft)
- Catchment area: 131.5 km^{2} (50.8 sq mi)
- Surface area: 102 hectares (250 acres)

Tashirobae Dam (Japanese: 田代八重ダム) is a gravity dam located in Miyazaki Prefecture in Japan. The dam is used for flood control, water supply, and power production. The catchment area of the dam is 131.5 km^{2}. The dam impounds about 102 ha of land when full and can store 19,270 thousand cubic meters of water. The construction of the dam was started on 1971 and completed in 1999.

== See also ==
- List of dams in Japan
