= Takaoka Dam =

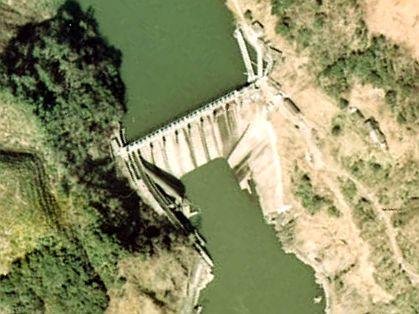
- Interactive map of Takaoka Dam
- Location: Miyazaki Prefecture, Japan
- Coordinates: 31.9375°N 131.2058°E

Takaoka Dam (Japanese: 高岡ダム) is a dam in Miyazaki Prefecture, Japan, completed in 1932.
