= Shimoaka Dam =

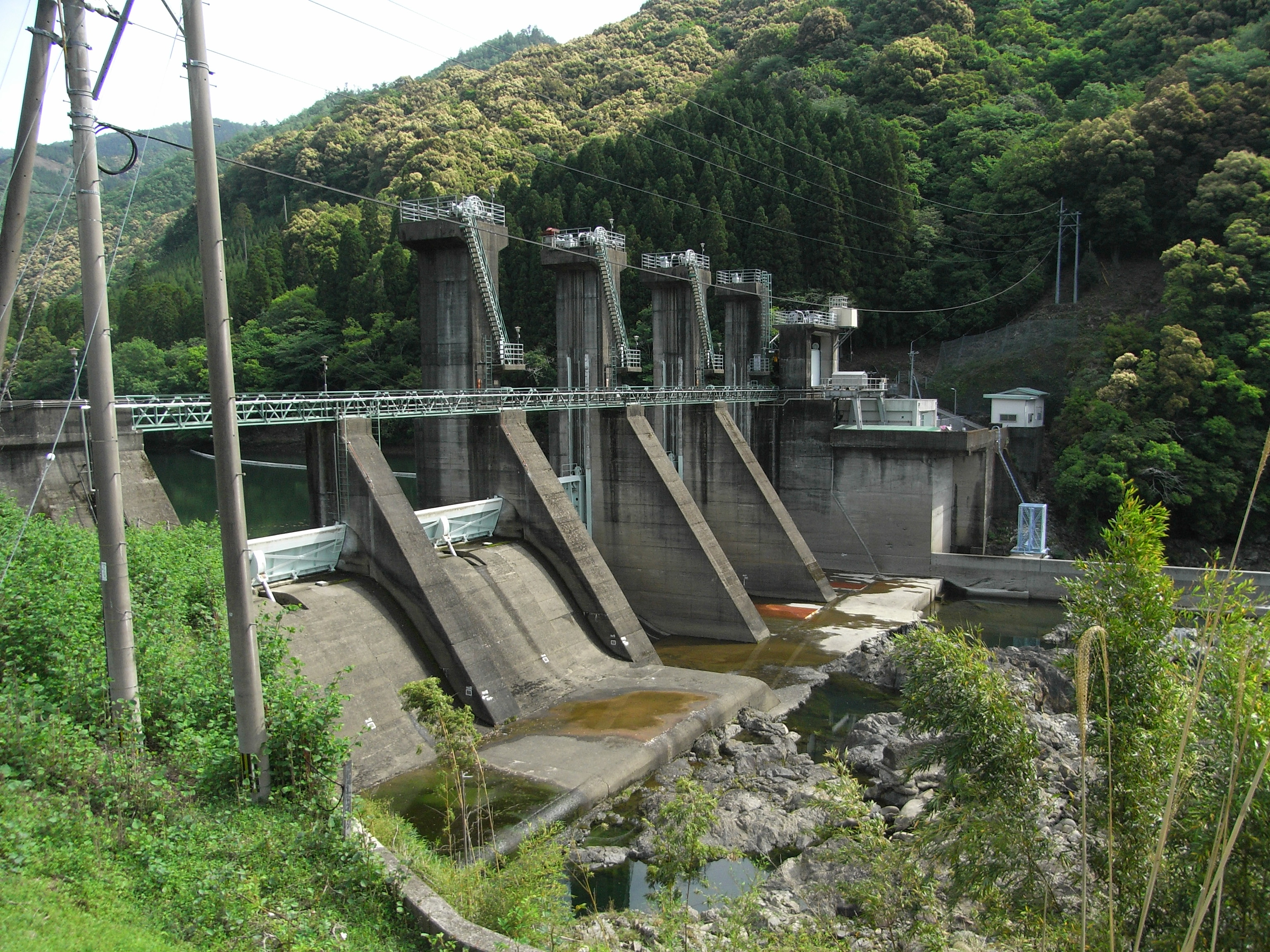
- Interactive map of Shimoaka Dam
- Location: Miyazaki Prefecture, Japan
- Coordinates: 32°45′01″N 131°37′49″E

Shimoaka Dam (Japanese: 下赤ダム) is a dam in Miyazaki Prefecture, Japan, completed in 1962.
