= Nishihata Dam =

Dam in Miyazaki Prefecture, Japan

Nishihata Dam (Pre)
- Location within Japan
- Official name: 西畑ダム（元）
- Location: Miyazaki Prefecture, Japan
- Coordinates: 32°40′22″N 131°26′53″E
- Construction began: 1957
- Opening date: 1958

Dam and spillways
- Height: 17.8 m (58 ft)
- Length: 45 m (148 ft)

Reservoir
- Total capacity: 247,000 m^{3} (8,700,000 cu ft)
- Catchment area: 51 km^{2} (20 sq mi)
- Surface area: 4 hectares (9.9 acres)

Nishihata Dam (Japanese: 西畑ダム（元）) is a gravity dam located in Miyazaki Prefecture in Japan. The dam is used for power production. The catchment area of the dam is 51 km^{2}. The dam impounds about 4 ha of land when full and can store 247 thousand cubic meters of water. The construction of the dam was started on 1957 and completed in 1958.

== See also ==
- List of dams in Japan
