= Sabukawa Dam =

Dam in Miyazaki Prefecture, Japan

- Location within Japan
- Official name: 寒川ダム
- Location: Miyazaki Prefecture, Japan
- Coordinates: 32°6′57″N 131°17′09″E
- Construction began: 1960
- Opening date: 1963

Dam and spillways
- Height: 33.5 m (110 ft)
- Length: 63.2 m (207 ft)

Reservoir
- Total capacity: 716,000 m^{3} (25,300,000 cu ft)
- Catchment area: 76.2 km^{2} (29.4 sq mi)
- Surface area: 6 hectares (15 acres)

Sabukawa Dam (Japanese: 寒川ダム) is a gravity dam located in Miyazaki Prefecture in Japan. The dam is used for power production. The catchment area of the dam is 76.2 km^{2}. The dam impounds about 6 ha of land when full and can store 716 thousand cubic meters of water. The construction of the dam was started on 1960 and completed in 1963.

== See also ==
- List of dams in Japan
