= Sugiyasu Dam =

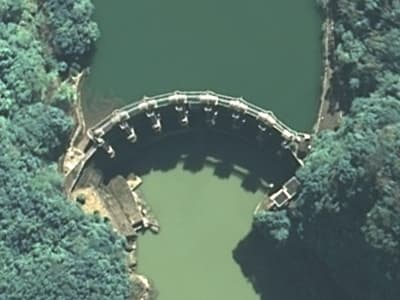
- Interactive map of Sugiyasu Dam
- Location: Miyazaki Prefecture, Japan

Sugiyasu Dam is a dam in Miyazaki Prefecture, Japan, finished in 1963.
