= Okita Dam =

Dam in Miyazaki Prefecture, Japan

- Location within Japan
- Official name: 沖田ダム
- Location: Miyazaki Prefecture, Japan
- Coordinates: 32°33′02″N 131°37′08″E
- Construction began: 1971
- Opening date: 2001

Dam and spillways
- Height: 36 m (118 ft)
- Length: 111 m (364 ft)

Reservoir
- Total capacity: 2,750,000 m^{3} (97,000,000 cu ft)
- Catchment area: 8.8 km^{2} (3.4 sq mi)
- Surface area: 26 hectares (64 acres)

Okita Dam (Japanese: 沖田ダム) is a gravity dam located in Miyazaki Prefecture in Japan. The dam is used for flood control. The catchment area of the dam is 8.8 km^{2}. The dam impounds about 26 ha of land when full and can store 2750 thousand cubic meters of water. The construction of the dam was started on 1971 and completed in 2001.

== See also ==
- List of dams in Japan
