= Hamanose Dam =

Dam in Miyazaki Prefecture, Japan

- Location within Japan
- Interactive map of Hamanose Dam
- Official name: 浜ノ瀬ダム
- Location: Miyazaki Prefecture, Japan
- Coordinates: 32°5′40″N 131°0′46″E
- Construction began: 1994
- Opening date: 2014

Dam and spillways
- Height: 62.5 m (205 ft)
- Length: 183 m (600 ft)

Reservoir
- Total capacity: 10300 thousand cubic meters
- Catchment area: 54.5 sq. km
- Surface area: 58 hectares

Hamanose Dam (Japanese: 浜ノ瀬ダム) is a gravity dam located in Miyazaki Prefecture in Japan. The dam is used for irrigation. The catchment area of the dam is 54.5 km^{2}. The dam impounds about 58 ha of land when full and can store 10300 thousand cubic meters of water. The construction of the dam was started on 1994 and completed in 2014.

== See also ==
- List of dams in Japan
