= Hitotsuse River =

River in southern Japan

Coordinates: 32°02′46″N 131°30′26″E

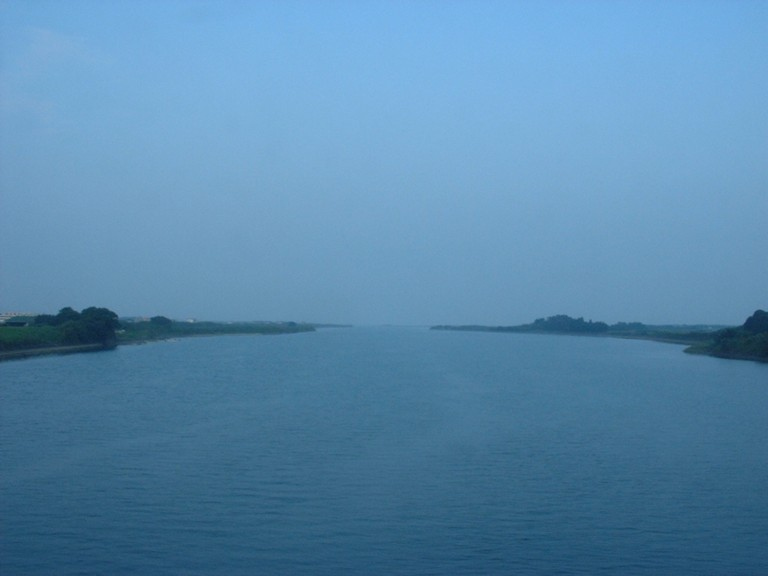

The Hitotsuse (Japanese:一ツ瀬川) is a fresh water river located in Miyazaki Prefecture in southern Japan. It drains to the ocean.
