= Kadogawa Bosai Dam =

Dam in Miyazaki Prefecture, Japan

- Location within Japan
- Interactive map of Kadogawa Bosai Dam
- Official name: 門川防災ダム
- Location: Miyazaki Prefecture, Japan
- Coordinates: 32°30′28″N 131°38′27″E
- Opening date: 1972

Dam and spillways
- Height: 31 m (102 ft)
- Length: 172 m (564 ft)

Reservoir
- Total capacity: 737 thousand cubic meters
- Catchment area: 6 sq. km
- Surface area: 12 hectares

Kadogawa Bosai Dam (Japanese: 門川防災ダム) is a rockfill dam located in Miyazaki Prefecture in Japan. The dam is used for flood control. The catchment area of the dam is 6 km^{2}. The dam impounds about 12 ha of land when full and can store 737 thousand cubic meters of water. The construction of the dam was completed in 1972.

== See also ==
- List of dams in Japan
