= Oyodogawa Dam =

Dam in Miyazaki Prefecture, Japan

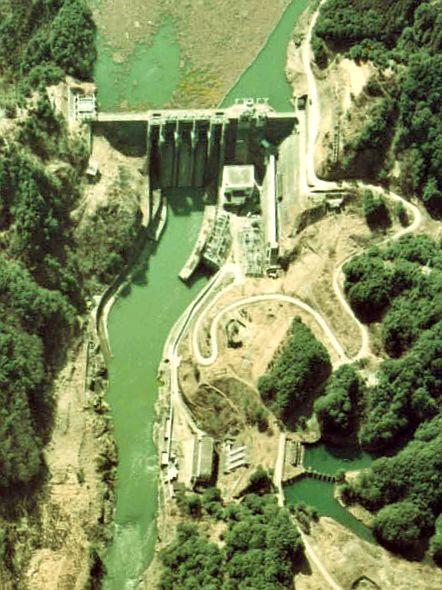
- Interactive map of Oyodogawa Dam
- Location: Miyazaki Prefecture, Japan
- Coordinates: 31°55′08″N 131°08′03″E

The Oyodogawa Dams (Japanese: 大淀川第一ダム) are two dams as part of a hydroelectric power station in Miyazaki Prefecture, Japan. The first was completed in 1961.
