= Matsuo Dam (Miyazaki) =

Dam in Miyazaki Prefecture, Japan

- Location within Japan
- Official name: 松尾ダム
- Location: Miyazaki Prefecture, Japan
- Coordinates: 32°17′03″N 131°22′16″E
- Construction began: 1939
- Opening date: 1951

Dam and spillways
- Height: 68 m (223 ft)
- Length: 165.5 m (543 ft)

Reservoir
- Total capacity: 45202 thousand cubic meters
- Catchment area: 304.1 sq. km
- Surface area: 195 hectares

Matsuo Dam (Japanese: 松尾ダム) is a gravity dam located in Miyazaki Prefecture in Japan. The dam is used for flood control and power production. The catchment area of the dam is 304.1 km^{2}. The dam impounds about 195 ha of land when full and can store 45202 thousand cubic meters of water. The construction of the dam was started on 1939 and completed in 1951.

== See also ==
- List of dams in Japan
