= Tenjin Dam =

Dam in Miyazaki Prefecture, Japan

- Location within Japan
- Official name: 天神ダム
- Location: Miyazaki Prefecture, Japan
- Coordinates: 31°49′07″N 131°13′49″E
- Construction began: 1978
- Opening date: 2001

Dam and spillways
- Height: 62.5 m (205 ft)
- Length: 441.7 m (1,449 ft)

Reservoir
- Total capacity: 6,700,000 m^{3} (240,000,000 cu ft)
- Catchment area: 10.2 km^{2} (3.9 sq mi)
- Surface area: 57 hectares (140 acres)

Tenjin Dam (Japanese: 天神ダム) is a rockfill dam located in Miyazaki Prefecture in Japan. The dam is used for irrigation. The catchment area of the dam is 10.2 km^{2}. The dam impounds about 57 ha of land when full and can store 6700 thousand cubic meters of water. The construction of the dam was started on 1978 and completed in 2001.

== See also ==
- List of dams in Miyazaki Prefecture
