= Hoshiyama Dam =

Dam in Miyazaki Prefecture, Japan

- Location within Japan
- Interactive map of Hoshiyama Dam
- Official name: 星山ダム
- Location: Miyazaki Prefecture, Japan
- Coordinates: 32°37′18″N 131°25′39″E
- Construction began: 1939
- Opening date: 1942

Dam and spillways
- Height: 30.5 m (100 ft)
- Length: 142 m (466 ft)

Reservoir
- Total capacity: 1731 thousand cubic meters
- Catchment area: 770 sq. km
- Surface area: 33 hectares

Hoshiyama Dam (Japanese: 星山ダム) is a gravity dam located in Miyazaki Prefecture in Japan. The dam is used for power production. The catchment area of the dam is 770 km^{2}. The dam impounds about 33 ha of land when full and can store 1731 thousand cubic meters of water. The construction of the dam was started on 1939 and completed in 1942.

== See also ==
- List of dams in Japan
