= Hiroto Dam =

Dam in Miyazaki Prefecture, Japan

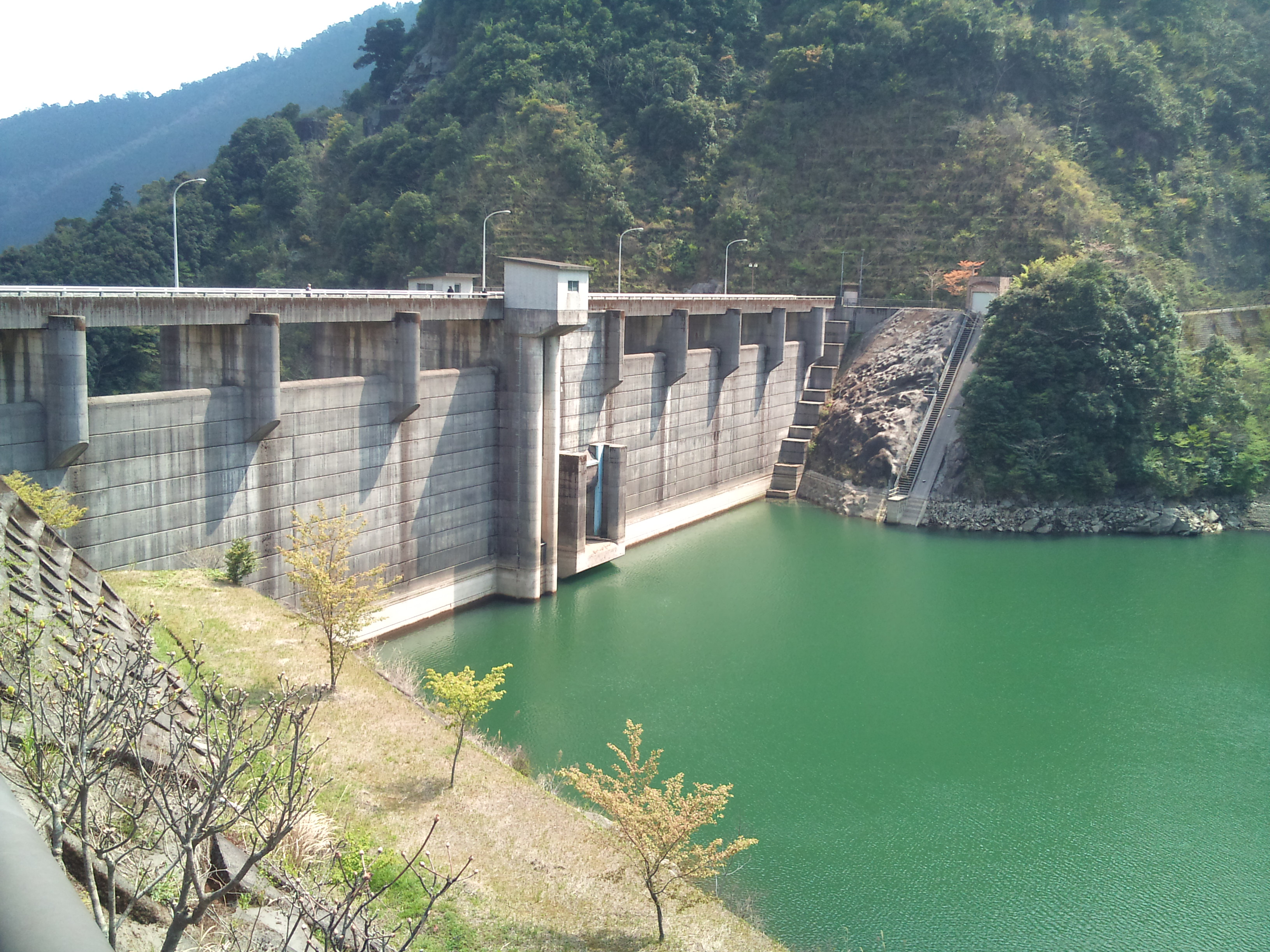

- Location within Japan
- Interactive map of Hiroto Dam
- Official name: 広渡ダム
- Location: Miyazaki Prefecture, Japan
- Coordinates: 31°42′56″N 131°16′03″E
- Construction began: 1969
- Opening date: 1993

Dam and spillways
- Height: 66 m (217 ft)
- Length: 170 m (560 ft)

Reservoir
- Total capacity: 6400 thousand cubic meters
- Catchment area: 34.4 sq. km
- Surface area: 38 hectares

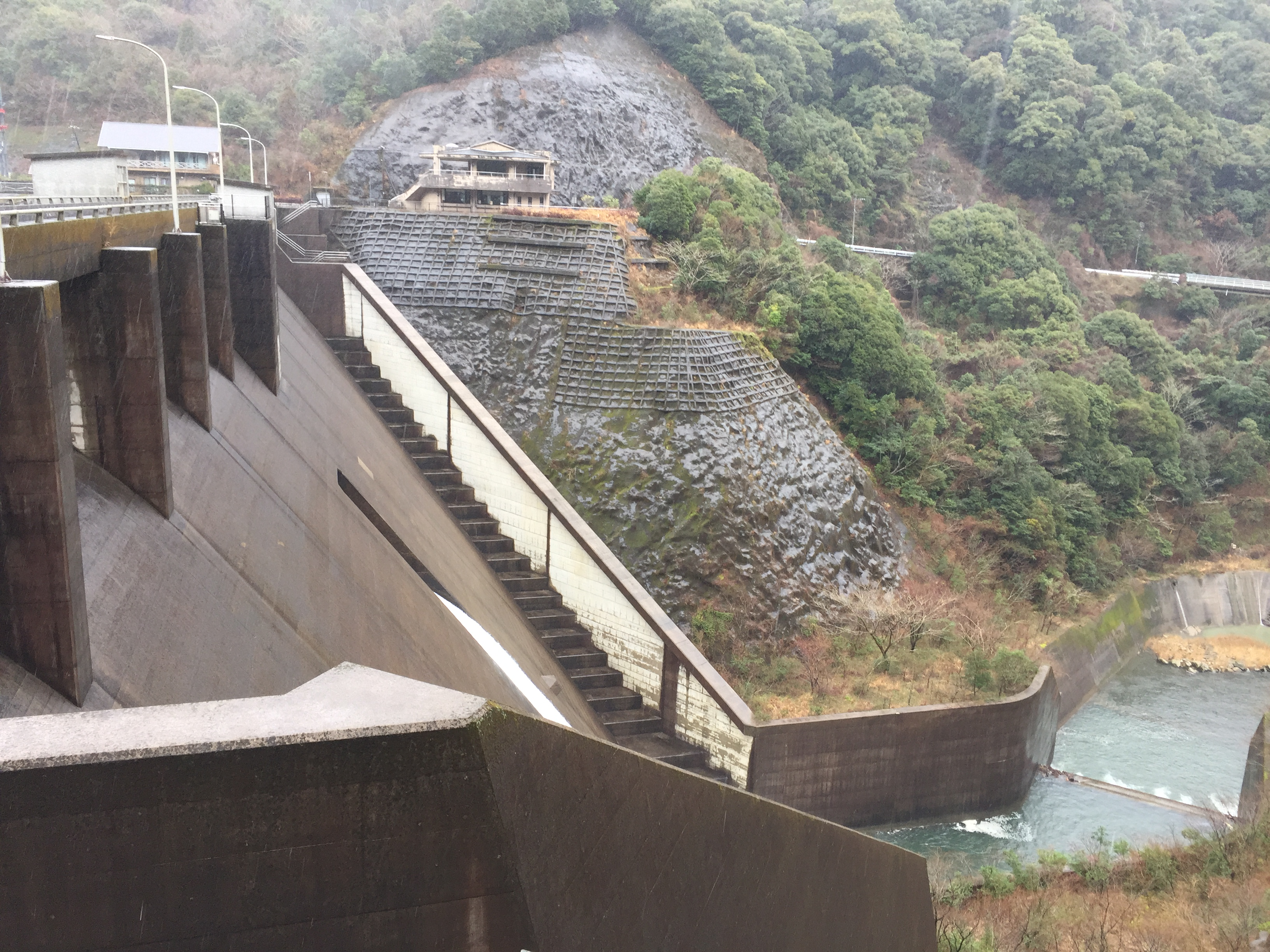

Hiroto Dam (Japanese: 広渡ダム) is a gravity dam located in Miyazaki Prefecture in Japan. The dam is used for flood control. The catchment area of the dam is 34.4 km^{2}. The dam impounds about 38 ha of land when full and can store 6400 thousand cubic meters of water. The construction of the dam was started on 1969 and completed in 1993.

== See also ==
- List of dams in Japan
