= Dokawa Dam =

Dam in Miyazaki Prefecture, Japan

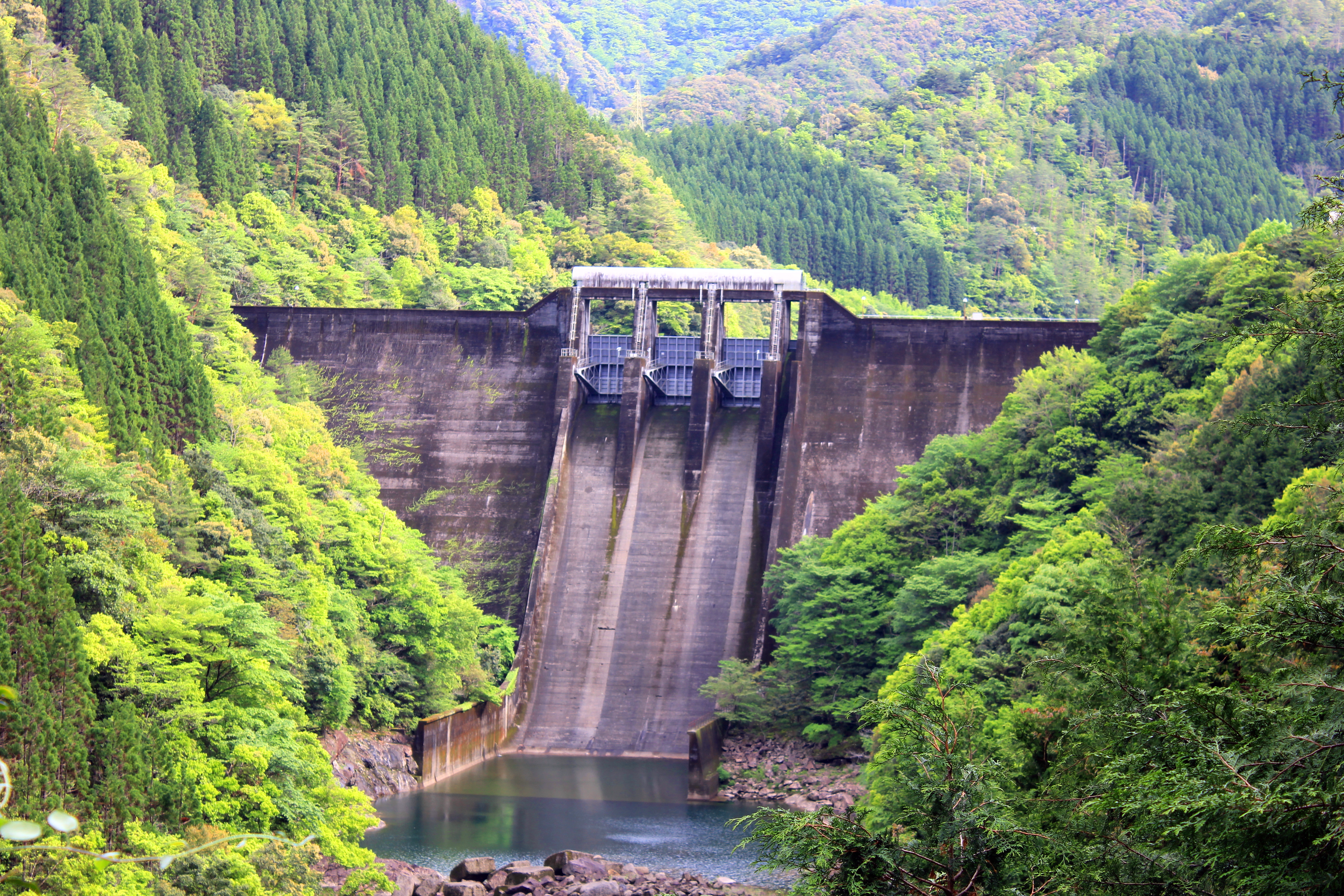

- Location within Japan
- Interactive map of Dokawa Dam
- Official name: 渡川ダム
- Location: Miyazaki Prefecture, Japan
- Coordinates: 32°21′19″N 131°20′42″E
- Construction began: 1951
- Opening date: 1956

Dam and spillways
- Height: 62.5 m (205 ft)
- Length: 173 m (568 ft)

Reservoir
- Total capacity: 33900 thousand cubic meters
- Catchment area: 143 sq. km
- Surface area: 154 hectares

Dokawa Dam (Japanese: 渡川ダム) is a gravity dam located in Miyazaki Prefecture in Japan. The dam is used for flood control and power production. The catchment area of the dam is 143 km^{2}. The dam impounds about 154 ha of land when full and can store 33900 thousand cubic meters of water. The construction of the dam was started on 1951 and completed in 1956.

== See also ==
- List of dams in Japan
