= Tachibana Dam =

Dam in Miyazaki Prefecture, Japan

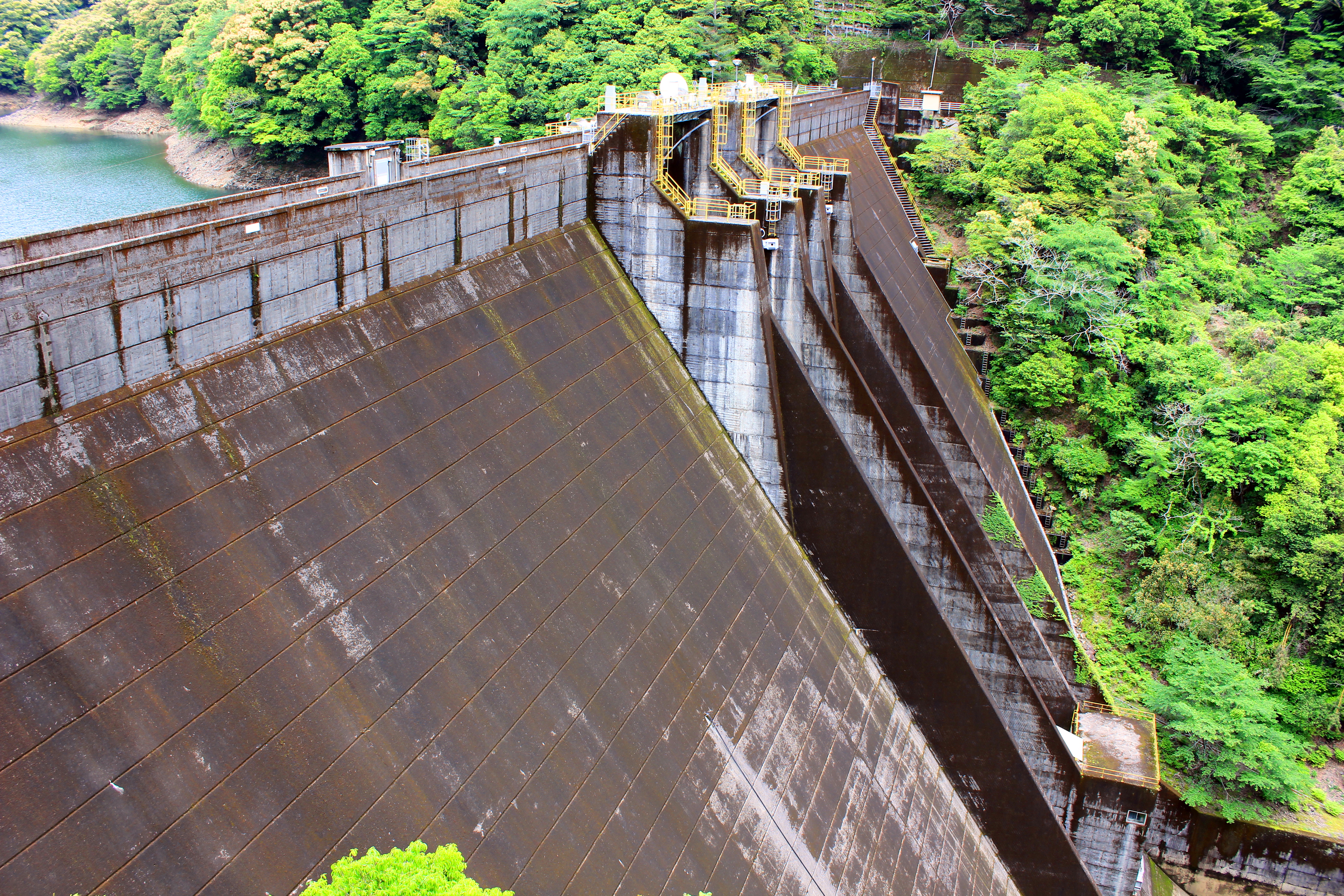

- Location within Japan
- Official name: 立花ダム
- Location: Miyazaki Prefecture, Japan
- Coordinates: 32°7′57″N 131°16′07″E
- Construction began: 1957
- Opening date: 1963

Dam and spillways
- Height: 71.3 m (234 ft)
- Length: 193.5 m (635 ft)

Reservoir
- Total capacity: 10,000,000 m^{3} (350,000,000 cu ft)
- Catchment area: 70.5 km^{2} (27.2 sq mi)
- Surface area: 29 hectares (72 acres)

Tachibana Dam (Japanese: 立花ダム) is a gravity dam located in Miyazaki Prefecture in Japan. The dam is used for flood control and power production. The catchment area of the dam is 70.5 km^{2}. The dam impounds about 29 ha of land when full and can store 10000 thousand cubic meters of water. The construction of the dam was started on 1957 and completed in 1963.

== See also ==
- List of dams in Japan
