= Morozuka Dam =

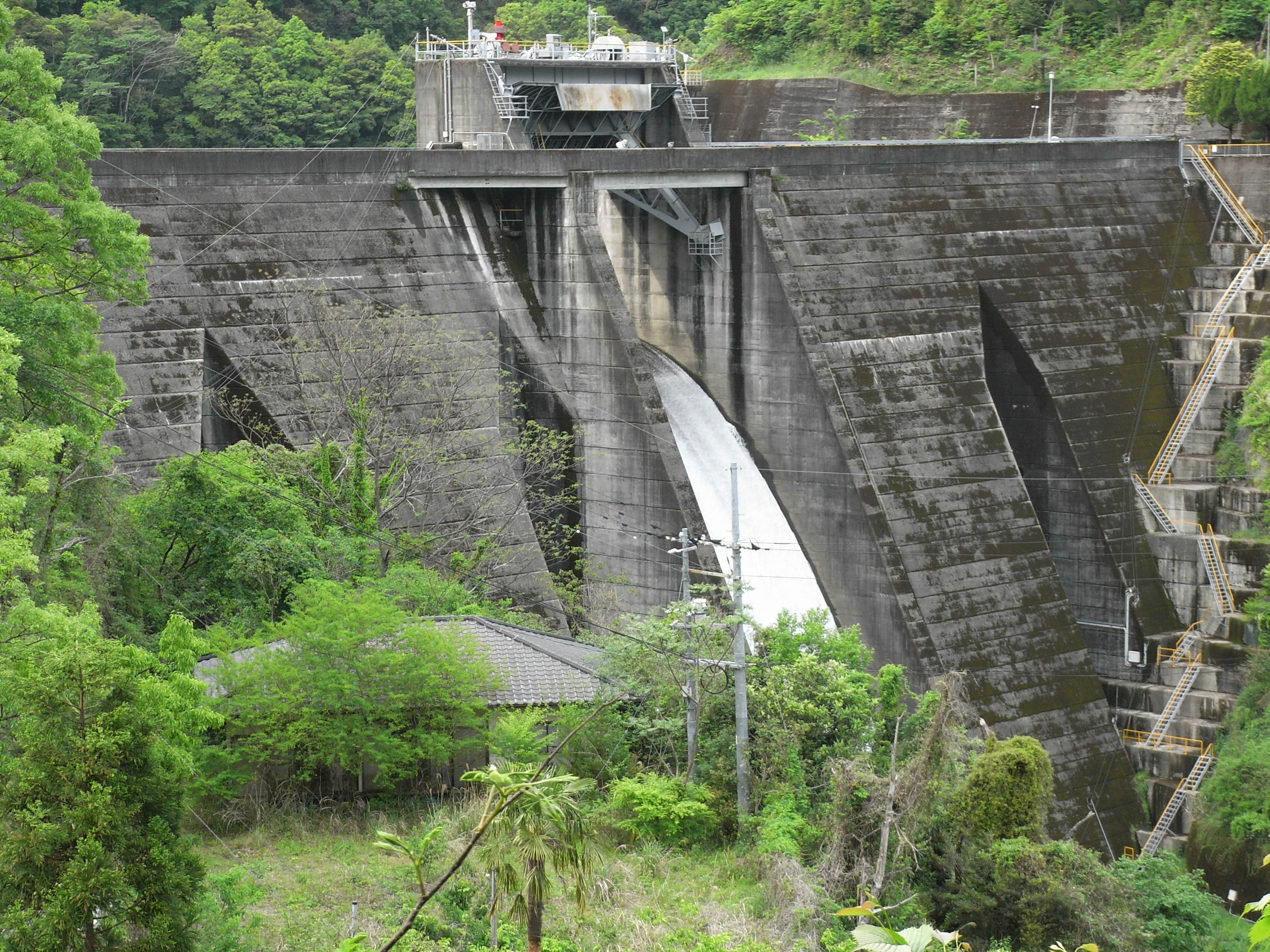
- Interactive map of Morozuka Dam
- Location: Miyazaki Prefecture, Japan
- Coordinates: 32°33′36″N 131°19′12″E
- Construction began: 1958
- Opening date: 1960

Dam and spillways
- Type of dam: Hollow gravity dam
- Height: 59 m (194 ft)
- Length: 149.5 m (490 ft)
- Dam volume: 94,000 m^{3}

Reservoir
- Total capacity: 3,484,000 m^{3}
- Catchment area: 109.1 km^{2}
- Surface area: 18 ha

Morozuka Dam (諸塚ダム, Morozuka damu) is a dam in Miyazaki Prefecture, Japan, completed in 1961.
