= Ayakita Dam =

Dam in Miyazaki Prefecture, Japan

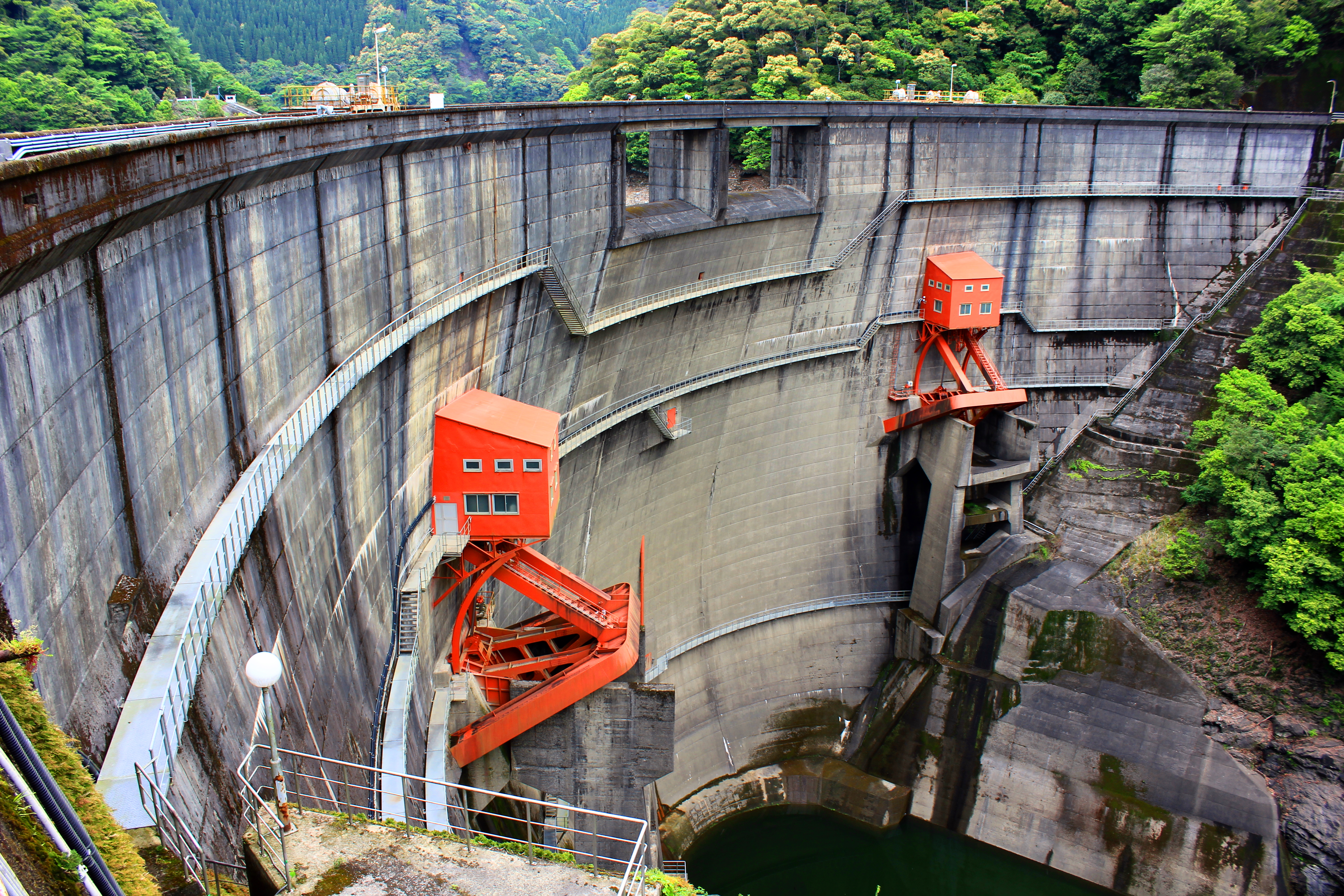

- Location within Japan
- Interactive map of Ayakita Dam
- Official name: 綾北ダム
- Location: Miyazaki Prefecture, Japan
- Coordinates: 32°5′54″N 131°8′34″E
- Construction began: 1957
- Opening date: 1960

Dam and spillways
- Height: 75.3 m (247 ft)
- Length: 190.3 m (624 ft)

Reservoir
- Total capacity: 21300 thousand cubic meters
- Catchment area: 149.3 sq. km
- Surface area: 95 hectares

Ayakita Dam (Japanese: 綾北ダム) is an arch dam located in Miyazaki Prefecture in Japan. The dam is used for flood control and power production. The catchment area of the dam is 149.3 km^{2}. The dam impounds about 95 ha of land when full and can store 21300 thousand cubic meters of water. The construction of the dam was started on 1957 and completed in 1960.

== See also ==
- List of dams in Japan
