= Iwayato Dam =

Dam in Miyazaki Prefecture, Japan

- Location within Japan
- Interactive map of Iwayato Dam
- Official name: 岩屋戸ダム
- Location: Miyazaki Prefecture, Japan
- Coordinates: 32°28′07″N 131°12′42″E
- Construction began: 1920
- Opening date: 1941

Dam and spillways
- Height: 57.5 m (189 ft)
- Length: 171 m (561 ft)

Reservoir
- Total capacity: 8309 thousand cubic meters
- Catchment area: 355.7 sq. km
- Surface area: 39 hectares

Iwayato Dam (Japanese: 岩屋戸ダム) is a gravity dam located in Miyazaki Prefecture in Japan. The dam is used for power production. The catchment area of the dam is 355.7 km^{2}. The dam impounds about 39 ha of land when full and can store 8309 thousand cubic meters of water. The construction of the dam was started on 1920 and completed in 1941.

== See also ==
- List of dams in Japan
