= Hirosawa Dam =

Dam in Miyazaki Prefecture, Japan

- Location within Japan
- Interactive map of Hirosawa Dam
- Official name: 広沢ダム
- Location: Miyazaki Prefecture, Japan
- Coordinates: 32°0′24″N 131°11′11″E
- Construction began: 1974
- Opening date: 2000

Dam and spillways
- Height: 62.7 m
- Length: 199 m

Reservoir
- Total capacity: 5100000 m^{3}
- Catchment area: 43 km^{2}
- Surface area: 35 ha

Hirosawa Dam (Japanese: 広沢ダム) is a gravity dam located in Miyazaki Prefecture in Japan. The dam is used for irrigation. The catchment area of the dam is 43 square kilometres. The dam impounds about 35 hectares of land when full and can store 5.1 million cubic metres of water. The construction of the dam was started on 1974 and completed in 2000.

== See also ==
- List of dams in Japan
