= Ayaminami Dam =

Dam in Miyazaki Prefecture, Japan

- Location within Japan
- Interactive map of Ayaminami Dam
- Official name: 綾南ダム
- Location: Miyazaki Prefecture, Japan
- Coordinates: 32°3′29″N 131°7′14″E
- Construction began: 1953
- Opening date: 1958

Dam and spillways
- Height: 64 m (210 ft)
- Length: 194.2 m (637 ft)

Reservoir
- Total capacity: 38000 thousand cubic meters
- Catchment area: 101 sq. km
- Surface area: 136 hectares

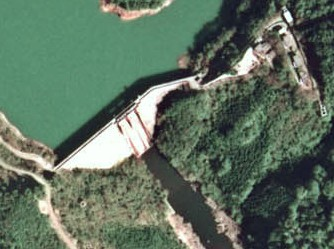
Ayaminami Dam, in 1976.

Ayaminami Dam (Japanese: 綾南ダム) is a gravity dam located in Miyazaki Prefecture in Japan. The dam is used for flood control and power production. The catchment area of the dam is 101 km^{2}. The dam impounds about 136 ha of land when full and can store 38000 thousand cubic meters of water. The construction of the dam was started on 1953 and completed in 1958.

== See also ==
- List of dams in Japan
