= Ohseuchi Dam =

Dam in Miyazaki Prefecture, Japan

- Location within Japan
- Official name: 大瀬内ダム
- Location: Miyazaki Prefecture, Japan
- Coordinates: 32°14′51″N 131°21′41″E
- Construction began: 1997
- Opening date: 2007

Dam and spillways
- Height: 65.5 m (215 ft)
- Length: 166 m (545 ft)

Reservoir
- Total capacity: 6,200,000 m^{3} (220,000,000 cu ft)
- Catchment area: 1.7 km^{2} (0.66 sq mi)
- Surface area: 27 hectares (67 acres)

Ohseuchi Dam (Japanese: 大瀬内ダム) is an asphalt dam located in Miyazaki Prefecture in Japan. The dam is used for power production. The catchment area of the dam is 1.7 km^{2}. The dam impounds about 27 ha of land when full and can store 6200 thousand cubic meters of water. The construction of the dam was started on 1997 and completed in 2007.

== See also ==
- List of dams in Japan
