= Miyanomoto Dam =

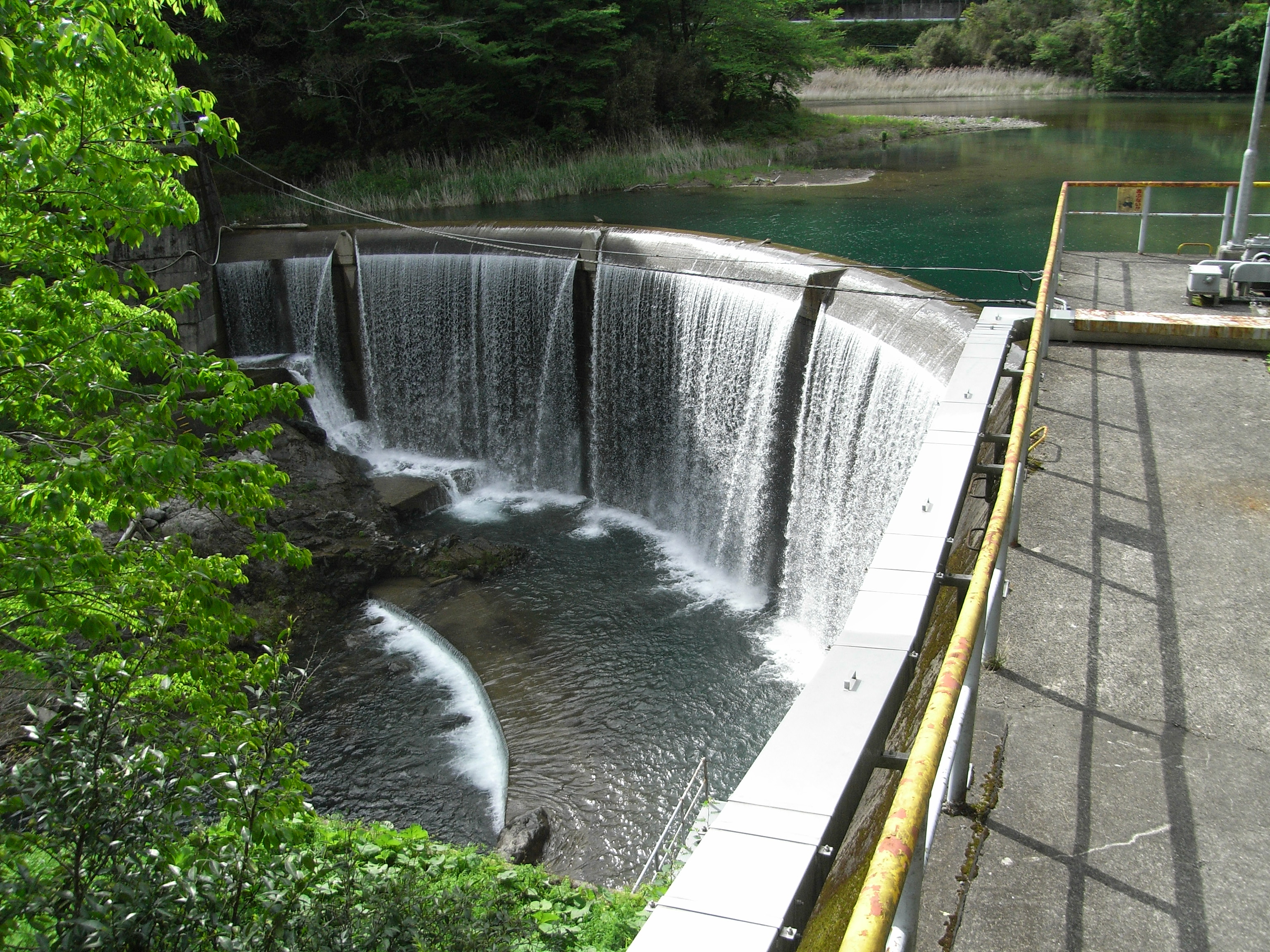
- Interactive map of Miyanomoto Dam
- Location: Miyazaki Prefecture, Japan
- Coordinates: 32°33′58″N 131°16′41″E

Miyanomoto Dam (Japanese: 宮の元ダム) is a dam in Miyazaki Prefecture, Japan. It was completed in 1961.
