= Kawabaru Dam =

Dam in Miyazaki Prefecture, Japan

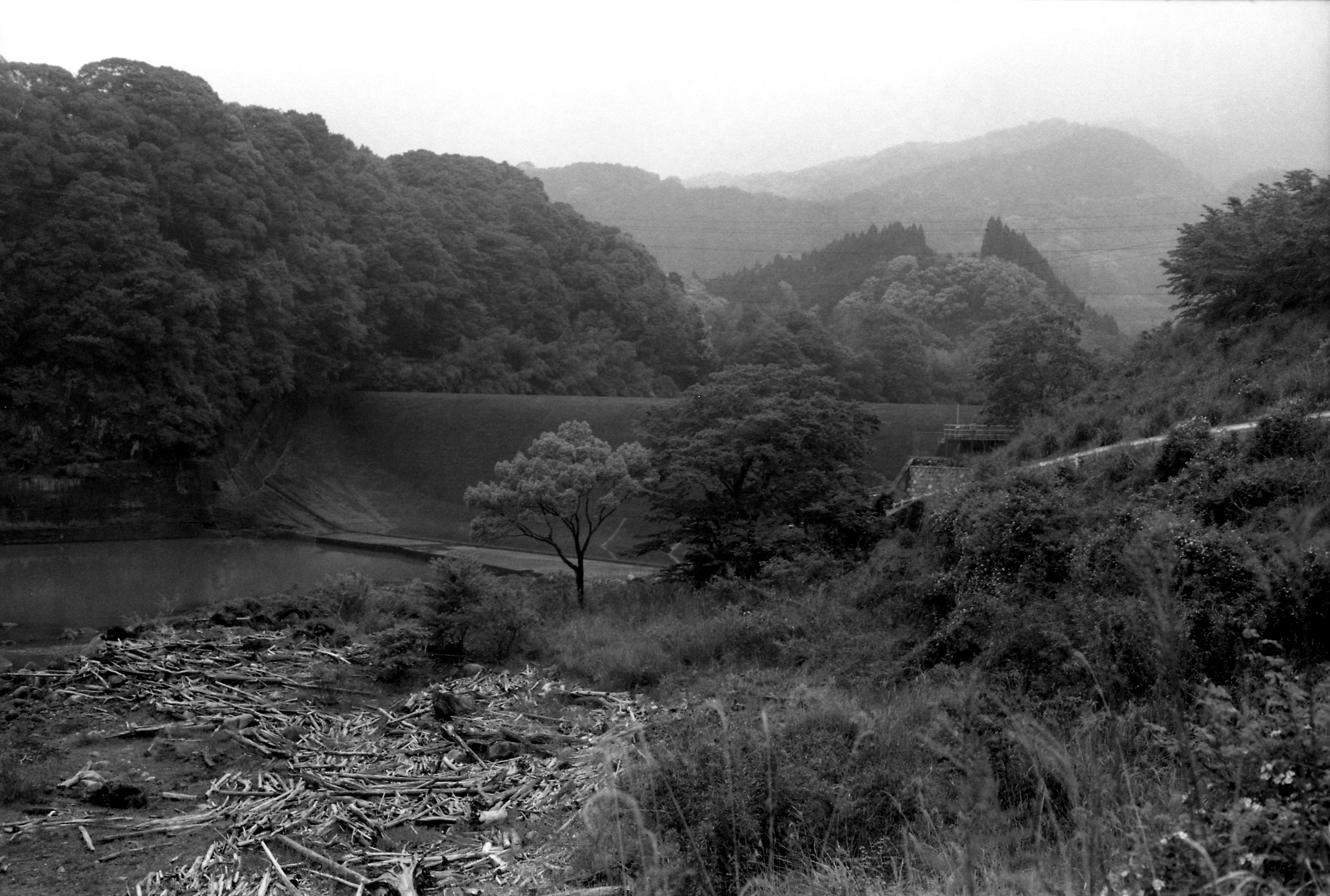

- Location within Japan
- Interactive map of Kawabaru Dam
- Official name: 川原ダム
- Location: Miyazaki Prefecture, Japan
- Coordinates: 32°12′48″N 131°25′01″E
- Construction began: 1937
- Opening date: 1939

Dam and spillways
- Height: 23.6 m (77 ft)
- Length: 150 m (490 ft)

Reservoir
- Total capacity: 3220 thousand cubic meters
- Catchment area: 359.2 sq. km
- Surface area: 42 hectares

Kawabaru Dam (Japanese: 川原ダム) is a gravity dam located in Miyazaki Prefecture in Japan. The dam is used for power production. The catchment area of the dam is 359.2 km^{2}. The dam impounds about 42 ha of land when full and can store 3220 thousand cubic meters of water. The construction of the dam was started on 1937 and completed in 1939.

== See also ==
- List of dams in Japan
