= Urita Dam =

Dam in Miyazaki Prefecture, Japan

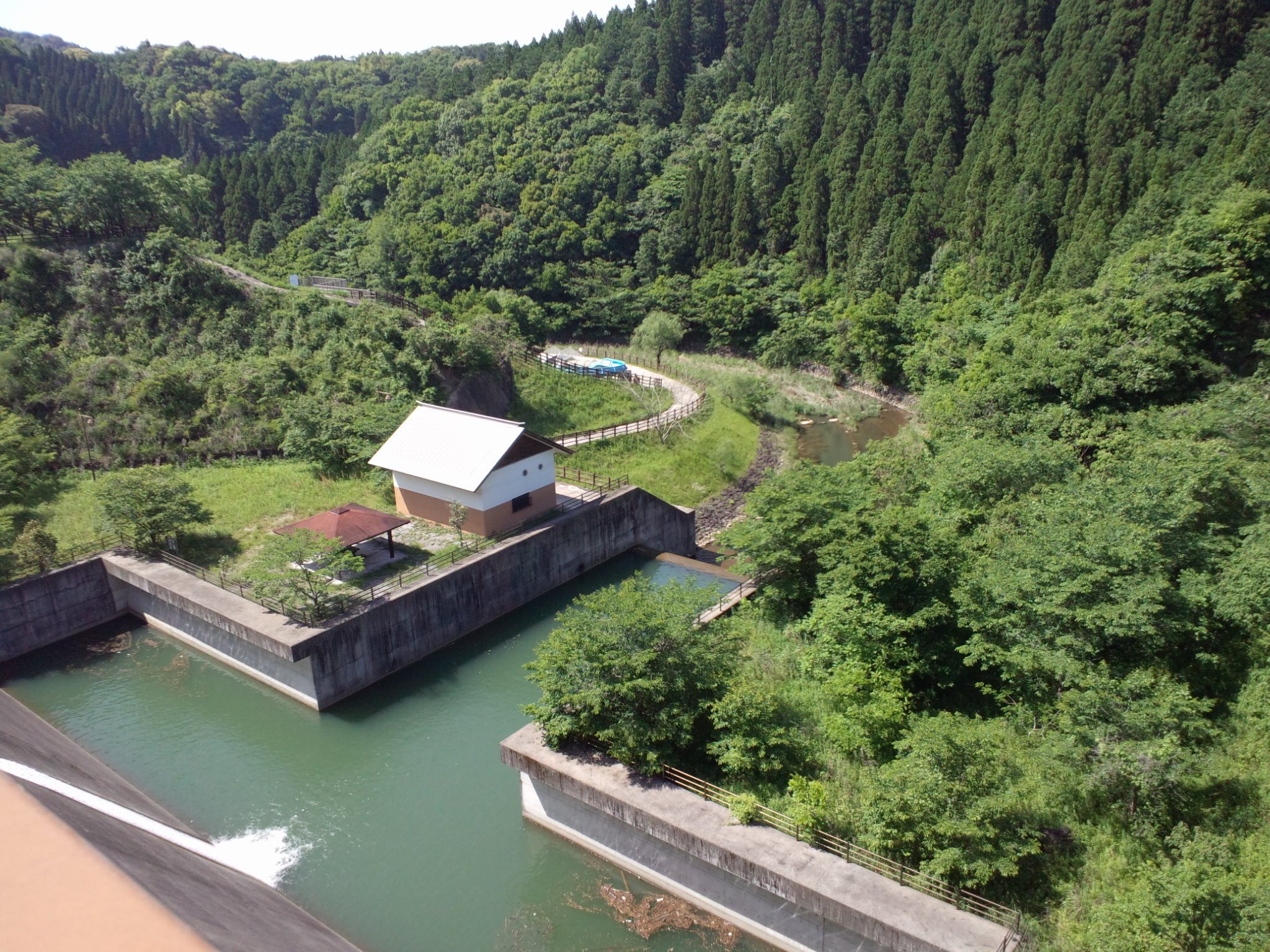

- Location within Japan
- Official name: 瓜田ダム
- Location: Miyazaki Prefecture, Japan
- Coordinates: 31°55′35″N 131°18′26″E
- Construction began: 1970
- Opening date: 1998

Dam and spillways
- Height: 42 m (138 ft)
- Length: 160.4 m (526 ft)

Reservoir
- Total capacity: 720,000 m^{3} (25,000,000 cu ft)
- Catchment area: 4.4 km^{2} (1.7 sq mi)
- Surface area: 7 hectares (17 acres)

Urita Dam (Japanese: 瓜田ダム) is a gravity dam located in Miyazaki Prefecture in Japan. The dam is used for flood control. The catchment area of the dam is 4.4 km^{2}. The dam impounds about 7 ha of land when full and can store 720 thousand cubic meters of water. The construction of the dam was started on 1970 and completed in 1998.

== See also ==
- List of dams in Japan
