= Koganebashi Dam =

Dam in Miyazaki Prefecture, Japan

- Location within Japan
- Official name: 古賀根橋ダム
- Location: Miyazaki Prefecture, Japan
- Coordinates: 32°4′35″N 131°10′39″E
- Construction began: 1953
- Opening date: 1958

Dam and spillways
- Height: 32 m (105 ft)
- Length: 108 m (354 ft)

Reservoir
- Total capacity: 1381 thousand cubic meters
- Catchment area: 281 sq. km
- Surface area: 12 hectares

Koganebashi Dam (Japanese: 古賀根橋ダム) is a gravity dam located in Miyazaki Prefecture in Japan. The dam is used for irrigation and power production. The catchment area of the dam is 281 km^{2}. The dam impounds about 12 ha of land when full and can store 1381 thousand cubic meters of water. The construction of the dam was started on 1953 and completed in 1958.

== See also ==
- List of dams in Japan
