= Konokawauchi Dam =

Dam in Miyazaki Prefecture, Japan

- Location within Japan
- Official name: 木之川内ダム
- Location: Miyazaki Prefecture, Japan
- Coordinates: 31°52′10″N 131°0′35″E
- Construction began: 1983
- Opening date: 2009

Dam and spillways
- Height: 64.3 m (211 ft)
- Length: 409.7 m (1,344 ft)

Reservoir
- Total capacity: 6270 thousand cubic meters
- Catchment area: 23.5 sq. km
- Surface area: 40 hectares

Konokawauchi Dam (Japanese: 木之川内ダム) is a rockfill dam located in Miyazaki Prefecture, Japan. The dam is used for irrigation. The catchment area of the dam is 23.5 km^{2}. The dam impounds about 40 ha of land when full and can store 6270 thousand cubic meters of water. The construction of the dam was started on 1983 and completed in 2009.

== See also ==
- List of dams in Japan
