= Kiribaru Dam =

Dam in Miyazaki Prefecture, Japan

- Location within Japan
- Official name: 切原ダム
- Location: Miyazaki Prefecture, Japan
- Coordinates: 32°13′06″N 131°28′02″E
- Construction began: 1990
- Opening date: 2012

Dam and spillways
- Height: 61.3 m (201 ft)
- Length: 227 m (745 ft)

Reservoir
- Total capacity: 2040 thousand cubic meters
- Catchment area: 4.2 sq. km
- Surface area: 11 hectares

Kiribaru Dam (Japanese: 切原ダム) is a gravity dam located in Miyazaki Prefecture in Japan. The dam is used for irrigation. The catchment area of the dam is 4.2 km^{2}. The dam impounds about 11 ha of land when full and can store 2040 thousand cubic meters of water. The construction of the dam was started on 1990 and completed in 2012.

== See also ==
- List of dams in Japan
