= Ouchibaro Dam =

Dam in Miyazaki Prefecture, Japan

- Interactive map of Ouchibaro Dam
- Location: Miyazaki Prefecture, Japan
- Coordinates: 32.4299°N 131.4816°E

Ouchibaro Dam is a dam in Miyazaki Prefecture, Japan, completed in 1956. It dams the Mimi River.
