= Saigo Dam =

- Location: Miyazaki Prefecture, Japan

Saigo Dam is a dam in Miyazaki Prefecture, Japan, completed in 1983. It dams the Mimi River.
