= Yamasubaru Dam =

Dam in Miyazaki Prefecture, Japan

- Interactive map of Yamasubaru Dam
- Location: Miyazaki Prefecture, Japan

Yamasubaru Dam is a dam in Miyazaki Prefecture, Japan, completed in 1932. It dams the Mimi River.
