= Kamishiiba Dam =

Coordinates: 32°27′37″N 131°08′58″E

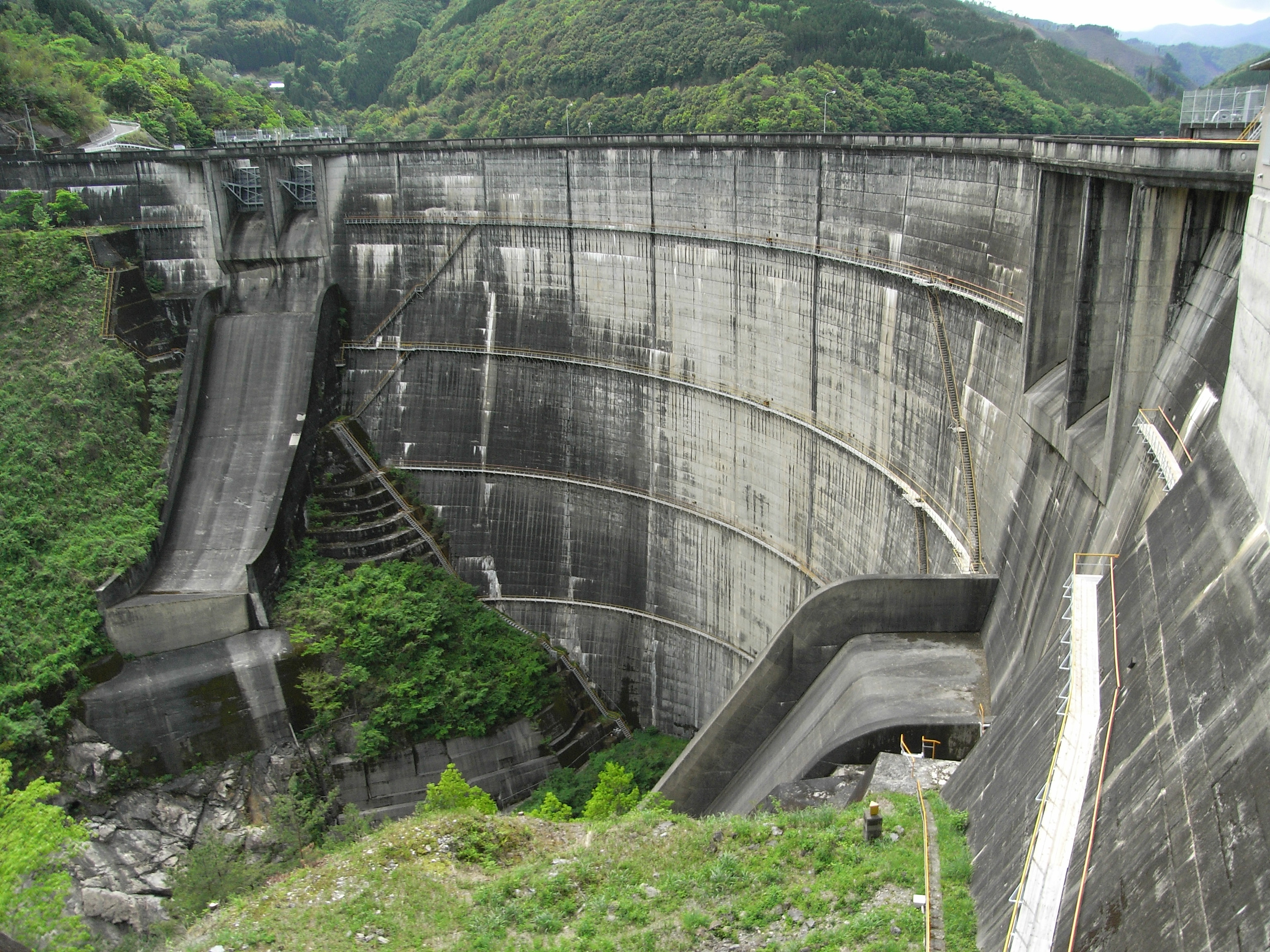
- Interactive map of Kamishiiba Dam
- Location: Miyazaki Prefecture, Japan
- Construction began: 1950
- Opening date: 1955

Dam and spillways
- Type of dam: Arch dam
- Height: 110 m (360 ft)
- Length: 341 m (1,119 ft)

Reservoir
- Active capacity: 76,000,000 m^{3} (2.7×10^{9} cu ft)

Kamishiiba Dam (Japanese: 上椎葉ダム) is a dam in Miyazaki Prefecture, Japan. Completed in 1955, it is Japan's first large-scale arch-shaped concrete dam.

The dam is situated on the Mimi River. It is 110 metres high and 341 metres wide. Hyūga Shiiba Lake, the reservoir behind the dam, has a capacity of 92 million cubic meters.

Construction of the dam took more than five years and involved some 5 million laborers. Of these, 105 workers died in the course of the work. The Statue of the Three Goddesses was erected nearby as a memorial to their sacrifice. The site was included in a list of Japan's 100 best reservoirs, and is popular with tourists.
