= Hase Dam (Miyazaki) =

Dam in Miyazaki Prefecture, Japan

- Location within Japan
- Interactive map of Hase Dam
- Official name: 長谷ダム
- Location: Miyazaki Prefecture, Japan
- Coordinates: 32°8′47″N 131°20′27″E
- Construction began: 1970
- Opening date: 1981

Dam and spillways
- Height: 65 m (213 ft)
- Length: 143 m (469 ft)

Reservoir
- Total capacity: 2250 thousand cubic meters
- Catchment area: 11.8 sq. km
- Surface area: 14 hectares

Hase Dam (Japanese: 長谷ダム) is a gravity dam located in Miyazaki Prefecture in Japan. The dam is used for flood control. The catchment area of the dam is 11.8 km^{2}. The dam impounds about 14 ha of land when full and can store 2250 thousand cubic meters of water. The construction of the dam was started on 1970 and completed in 1981.

== See also ==
- List of dams in Japan
