= Ryushin Shouchi Ryu =

Japanese swordsmanship school

Ryushin Shouchi Ryu (柳心照智流)
- Ryūshin Shōchi Ryū mon
- Date founded: 2006
- Country of origin: Japan
- Founder: Kawabata Terutaka 河端 照孝
- Current head: Watanabe Yoshio 渡邊 喜雄
- Arts taught: Iaijutsu, Kenjutsu, and Mutōjutsu
- Ancestor schools: Tenshinsho Jigen Ryu

Ryushin Shouchi Ryu (柳心照智流, Ryūshin Shōchi Ryū) is a contemporary school of Japanese swordsmanship founded by Kawabata Terutaka in 2006, specializing in iaijutsu (sword-drawing techniques), kenjutsu (swordsmanship), and mutōjutsu (unarmed techniques against armed opponents).

The school is particularly noted for its use of the uchigatana, a traditional Japanese sword that was historically shorter and lighter than the tachi. This configuration facilitates rapid drawing and cutting techniques. Practitioners emphasize precise, fluid movements involving drawing, cutting, and sheathing the sword. Certain kata exhibit a flowing elegance reminiscent of traditional Japanese sword dancing. However, this aesthetic quality is not merely decorative but reflects the martial principles underlying the techniques.

According to the school, its historical origins lie in Tenshinshō Jigen-ryū, a swordsmanship tradition derived from Tenshin Shōden Katori Shintō-ryū. Originally established as Ryūshin Jigen-ryū, the school adopted its present name in 2011.

The current headmaster is Watanabe Yoshio, who succeeded Yahagi Kunikazu in 2023.

== History ==
According to the school's lineage, Ryushin Shouchi Ryu is a branch tradition of Tenshinshō Jigen-ryū, a system attributed to Tose Yosazaemon Osamune (十瀬 与三左衛門 長宗, c. 1540–1600) during the Eiroku era (1558–1570), specializing in kenjutsu. Tose was a landholding samurai from Hitachi Province. While in his twenties, he traveled to Katori Shrine to study Tenshin Shōden Katori Shintō-ryū under its third headmaster, Iizasa Wakasa no Kami Morinobu. After five years of training, he received a menkyo kaiden (license of complete transmission) and continued his studies at Kashima Shrine. According to tradition, while at Kashima, Tose experienced a spiritual revelation and received a catalog of techniques through an oracle associated with Takemikazuchi. Following this experience, he established Tenshinshō Jigen-ryū, adopting the term Tenshinshō (true and correct transmission from the deity of Katori Shrine, Futsunushi) from Tenshin Shōden Katori Shintō-ryū and adding jigen (self-power revelation), reflecting his spiritual experience at Kashima Shrine. The tradition was subsequently transmitted to Kaneko Shinkurō Morisada (金子 新九郎 盛貞, c. 1520–1585), who is traditionally recognized as the second headmaster of Tenshinshō Jigen-ryū.

The third headmaster, Akasaka Yakurō Masatsune (赤坂 弥九郎 政雅, 1567–1594), was introduced to Kaneko at the age of thirteen to study swordsmanship for the purpose of avenging his father's death. According to historical accounts, Akasaka mastered Tenshinshō Jigen-ryū by the age of seventeen and avenged his father's death two years later. Shortly afterward, he moved to Kyoto and became a monk at Tenneiji Temple of the Sōtō Zen school, adopting the Buddhist dharma name Zenkitsu (善吉, also read Zenkichi). In 1588, Tōgō Shigekata (東郷 重位, 1560–1643) became a student of Zenkitsu and is said to have mastered Tenshinshō Jigen-ryū in less than a year. Tōgō subsequently combined the Taisha-ryū, which he had previously studied under its founder, Marume Kurandonosuke Tessai, with Tenshinshō Jigen-ryū to establish Jigen-ryū. According to tradition, Tenshinshō Jigen-ryū continued to be transmitted privately through the Jigen-ryū and Yakumaru Jigen-ryū lines, passing through successive generations of headmasters for nearly four centuries.

Tenshinshō Jigen-ryū experienced a revival under Ueno Yasuyuki Genshin (上野 靖之 源心, 1913–1973), who taught the tradition in Asakusa, Tokyo, until his death in 1973. Kawabata Terutaka (河端 照孝, born July 12, 1940) began his formal training under Ueno in 1965 at the Sōgō Budō Shōbukan, which had been established in 1964 by Kawabata's father. Kawabata eventually received menkyo kaiden in Tenshinshō Jigen-ryū. Following Ueno's death, he assisted his senior, Shimizu Tadatsugu, in preserving the tradition and began teaching at the NRC dojo in Akasaka in 1975.

In addition to his martial arts training, Kawabata studied Japanese swords under Satō Kanzan Kan'ichi and Honma Kunzan Junji, both associated with the establishment of the Nihon Bijutsu Tōken Hozon Kyōkai (NBTHK). He later became involved in organizations dedicated to the preservation and appreciation of Japanese swords. Kawabata continued his swordsmanship instruction and eventually established the Seiseikan in Akabane, Tokyo, where he founded Ryūshin Jigen-ryū in 2006.

In 2008, Kawabata's senior student, Yahagi Kunikazu (矢作 訓一, born April 5, 1948), became the second headmaster of Ryūshin Jigen-ryū. Yahagi had begun training under Kawabata in 1978 and was also an experienced practitioner of kendō and judo. Under his leadership, the school's curriculum was further developed and its international activities expanded through seminars and instruction outside Japan.

In 2011, the school's name was changed from Ryūshin Jigen-ryū to Ryushin Shouchi Ryu. The new name, selected by Kawabata, was intended to express the school's emphasis on cultivating the mind and conditioning the body through rigorous martial arts training.

In 2023, Watanabe Yoshio (渡邊喜雄, born February 14, 1949) became the third headmaster of Ryushin Shouchi Ryu, succeeding Yahagi Kunikazu. Watanabe, a longtime practitioner of Japanese swordsmanship with experience in Japanese sword appreciation and equestrian activities, assumed leadership of the school in Japan. Yahagi retained the position of shuseki shihan (chief instructor) and continued his international teaching activities.

The school has also participated in traditional martial arts demonstrations, including the Kobudō Hōnō Enbu Taikai (古武道奉納演武大会) held at Katori Shrine.

== Philosophy ==
The name Ryūshin Shōchi Ryū (柳心照智流) was selected by the school's founder, Kawabata Terutaka, to reflect the cultivation of the mind and body through martial arts training. Ryūshin (柳心) translates as "mind" or "heart of the willow tree", symbolizing the combination of strength and flexibility. Shōchi (照智) means "shining wisdom". Together, the characters express the ideal of developing an unwavering mind and wisdom through a strong yet adaptable body and spirit.

The school's philosophy emphasizes maintaining a calm and composed state of mind while responding naturally to changing circumstances. The willow tree serves as a metaphor for resilience and adaptability, reflecting the importance of flexibility rather than rigidity in both swordsmanship and everyday life.

== International development ==
Ryushin Shouchi Ryu expanded internationally under the leadership of its second headmaster, Yahagi Kunikazu, who conducted seminars and provided instruction to practitioners outside Japan. The school established a presence in Europe, North America, and other parts of Asia, with affiliated schools and study groups practicing the tradition.

Following the appointment of Watanabe Yoshio as third headmaster in 2023, Yahagi continued to serve as shuseki shihan (chief instructor), maintaining his involvement in the school's international instruction and development. The school's honbu dōjō (headquarters dojo) in Japan also sends instructors and representatives to affiliated schools and international seminars to support the transmission of its teachings and the practice of the tradition worldwide.
