= Heijo Muteki Ryu =

Heijō Muteki Ryū
- Ko-ryū

Foundation
- Founder: Yamanouchi Renshinsai
- Date founded: c 1668
- Period founded: Early Edo period

Arts taught
- Art: Description
- Kenjutsu/Kendo: Sword Art/Way

Descendant schools
- Kendo

Heijo Muteki Ryu (Heijō Muteki Ryū) is a Japanese school of swordsmanship (kenjutsu/kendo) that was founded by Yamanouchi Renshinsai. In c 1668, Yamanouchi Renshinsai described his swordsmanship as kendo.

== See also ==
- Abe ryū
- Kenjutsu
- Kendo
