= Denrinbō Raikei =

Chinese-born Japanese martial artist

- Born: Ming
- Native name: 伝林坊頼慶
- Other names: Benkei Musō
- Style: Taisha-ryū Ninjutsu and Kenjutsu (タイ捨流)
- Teacher: Marume Nagayoshi

Denrinbō Raikei (伝林坊 頼慶), also known as Benkei Musō, was a Chinese-born Japanese martial artist, ninja, swordsman, and Yamabushi. He belonged to Hitoyoshi Domain as ninja. He was thought to be the head of ninja group, Ura-Taisha(裏タイ捨) or Sagara-ningun(相良忍軍).

== Biography ==
Raikei was thought to be Chinese martial artist who traveled to Japan. According to documents owned by Marume clan, he fought a duel with Oda "Rokuemon" Sekika in Nagasaki. Sekika was the disciple of Marume Nagayoshi a renowned swordsman and the founder of Taisha-ryū. He was defeated by Sekika, and became Nagayoshi's disciple.

Raikei became one of the finest disciples of Nagayoshi. At the time, Taisha-ryū training contained several arts including ninjutsu. He was given menkyo and assigned to teach other disciples in place of Nagayoshi. He seemed to show more talent for ninjutsu than kenjutsu, and become the general coach of ninjutsu in Taisha-ryū school. He also managed to help Arise Geki, the navy commander of Taisha-ryū construct Junk ships.

In 1635, Raikei gave certification of Taisha-ryū to Nagata Morimasa. After this event, he became shugensha or Yamabushi at Mt. Iwaya in Kashima. During his pilgrimage, Raikei became prominent figure among Yamabushi and Sanka, itinerant people among the mountains, and established ninja corps.

According to Taisha-ryū tradition, this ninja group called Ura-Taisha(Shadow Taisha) and opposed Shogunate force such as Yagyū clan, Iga, Kōga. A few Taisha-ryū dojos suggest that Raikei was the head of Sagara-ningun(Sagara ninja troops), the ninja group served Sagara clan, the daimyō of Hitoyoshi Domain.

There is no further written information about him after this.

However, it is documented that the man called Benkei Musō initiated Taketsugi Yosanbei into the art of Taisha-ryū at Ureshino in 1651. Musō is identified Raikei by Miyazaki Jūnen, the practitioner and researcher of Taisha-ryū.

Raikei was buried next to his master, Nagayoshi.

== Legacy ==
Raikei was credited as the second headmaster of Kataoka Taisha-ryū, the Kinki line of Taisha-ryū.

One of the private writing of Taisha-ryū contains Chinese-style illustrations which attributed to Raikei.

== See also ==
- Benkei
- Kamiizumi Nobutsuna
- List of foreign-born samurai in Japan
