= Akaike =

Akaike (赤池) is a Japanese surname and location name.

Akaike may also refer to:

- Akaike information criterion statistical formula

== People ==
- Hirotsugu Akaike (赤池 弘次, 1927–2009), Japanese statistician
- Masaaki Akaike (赤池 誠章, born 1961), Japanese politician
- Akaike Nagatō (赤池 長任, 1529–1568), medieval Japanese warlord

== Places ==
- Akaike, Fukuoka, former town
- Akaike Station (Aichi)
- Akaike Station (Fukuoka)
- Akaike Station (Gifu)
