= Haruhiro =

- Gender: Male

Origin
- Origin: Japanese
- Meaning: Different meanings depending on the kanji used

Haruhiro (written: 治広, 晴広 or 遥大) is a masculine Japanese given name. Notable people with the name include:

- Haruhiro Hamaguchi (濵口 遥大; born 1995), Japanese baseball player
- Sagara Haruhiro (相良 晴広; 1513–1555), Japanese daimyō
- Haruhiro Yamashita (山下 治広; born 1938), Japanese gymnast
- Haruhiro Inoue, Japanese surgeon and endoscopist
- Haruhiro Iima, main protagonist of the series Hai to Gensou no Grimgar.
