= Masatsune =

- Gender: Male

Origin
- Origin: Japanese
- Meaning: Different meanings depending on the kanji used

Masatsune (written: 正恆, 正経, 雅経 or 政雅) is a masculine Japanese given name. Notable people with the name include:

- Asukai Masatsune (飛鳥井 雅経; 1170–1221), Japanese poet
- Hoshina Masatsune (保科 正経; 1647–1681), Japanese daimyō
- Inoue Masatsune (井上 正経; 1725–1766), Japanese daimyō
- Masatsune Ogura (小倉 正恆; 1875–1961), Japanese politician
- Terasaka Yakuro Masatsune (赤坂 弥九郎 政雅; 1567–1594), Japanese swordsman
