= Terasaka =

Terasaka (written: 寺坂 or 寺阪) is a Japanese surname. Notable people with the surname include:

- Kento Terasaka (寺坂 研人), Japanese manga artist
- Terasaka Yakuro Masatsune (赤坂 弥九郎 政雅, 1567 – 1594), chief priest at the Buddhist temple Tennenji near Kyoto
- Terasaka Kichiemon (寺坂 吉右衛門, 1665 – 1747), Japanese Samurai

== Fictional characters ==
- Ryōma Terasaka (寺坂 竜馬), a character in the manga series Assassination Classroom
