= Yakumaru Jigen-ryū =

Yakumaru Jigen-ryū (薬丸自顕流)
- Ko-ryū
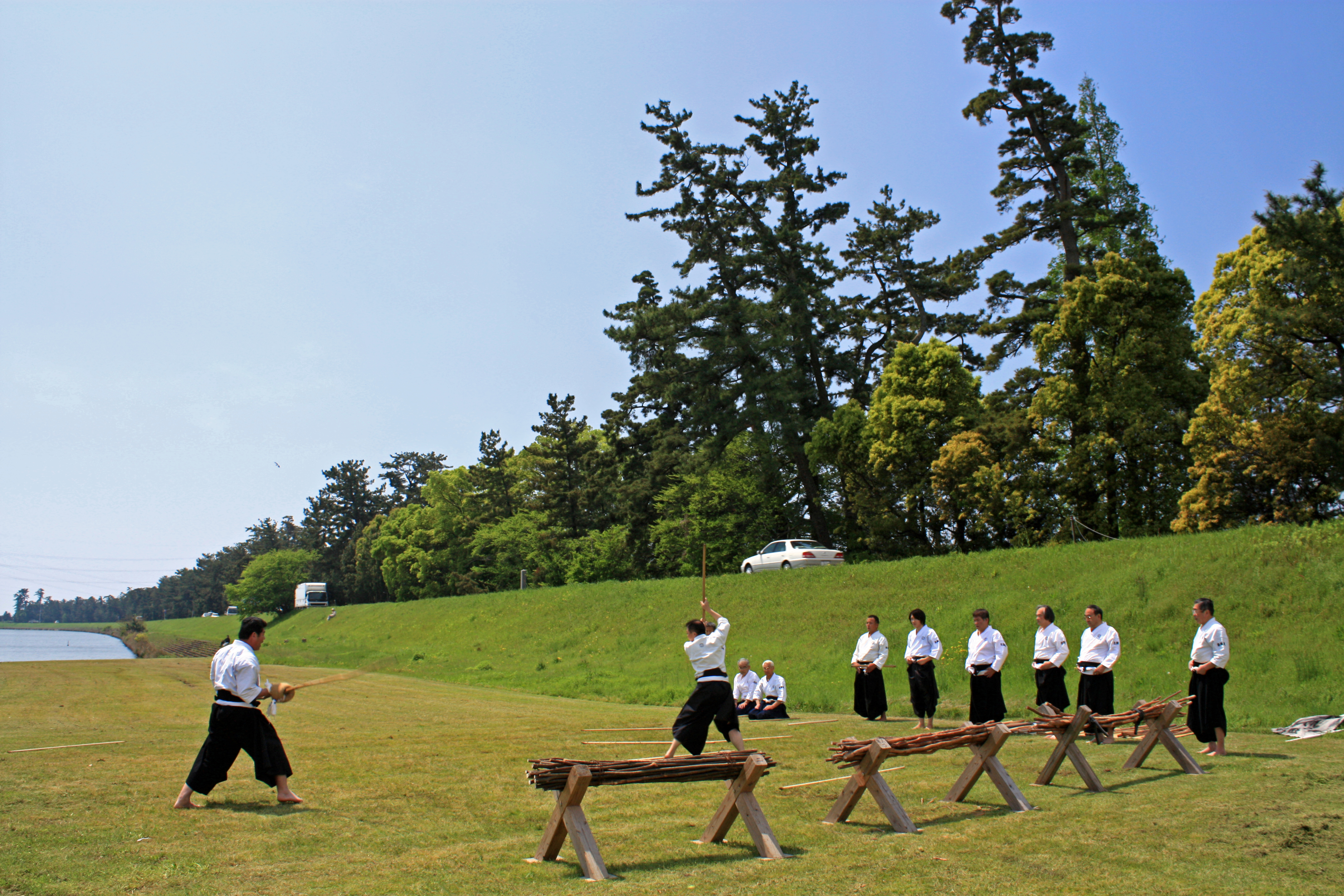

Foundation
- Founder: Yakumaru Kanenori I 薬丸 兼陳
- Period founded: 17th century

Arts taught
- Art: Description
- Kenjutsu: Swordsmanship

Ancestor schools
- Jigen-ryū

Yakumaru Jigen-ryū (薬丸自顕流) is a traditional school (koryū) of Japanese swordsmanship founded in the 17th century by Satsuma retainer Yakumaru Kanenori I as a branch of high-speed Jigen-ryū. It integrates the Yakumaru family's nodachi techniques into Jigen-ryū.

Okuda Saneo asserted that the original name of the school was Nodachi Jigen-ryū (野太刀自顕流) because that is the name used in a training manual written by Yakumaru Kaneyoshi II in 1864. However, the name "Yakumaru Jigen-ryū" became widely used in the late 19th century and is today the standard.

== Summary ==
Yakumaru Kanenori I's grandfather, Yakumaru Kaneshige I, was a retainer of Shimazu Yoshihiro, master swordsman, and veteran of the Japanese invasions of Korea. Out of around 1000 Shimazu samurai at the Battle of Sekigahara, Kaneshige was one of roughly 80 to escape the Tokugawa encirclement alive by charging straight through the enemy battle lines alongside Yoshihiro.

Like its parent school Jigen-ryū, Yakumaru Jigen-ryū is characterized by the repetition of a powerful downward strike with the sword toward the opponent's head from hassō stance accompanied by a high-pitched battle cry. Yakumaru Jigen-ryū is the simplest of all schools of kenjutsu, containing no moral or philosophical theories and teaching only one cut — even fewer than Jigen-ryū. It includes no defensive techniques.

The battle cry uttered during the strikes is called the Enkyō (猿叫; lit. 'monkey's scream') and has been compared to "the sound of a chicken being strangled" (鶏の絞められる声). Because of this, those unfamiliar with the Yakumaru school sometimes find demonstrations of the technique disconcerting to witness. Upon observing a Yakumaru practice session, Shimazu Narioki is said to have remarked, "This is nothing but the swordsmanship of a madman" (まるでキチガイ剣術じゃ) and left the room.

In 1832, Yakumaru Kanetake was banished to Yakushima for his efforts to establish Yakumaru Jigen-ryū as an independent school fully separate from the mainstream Jigen-ryū founded by Tōgō Shigekata. At the time, Jigen-ryū was the Satsuma Domain's only officially recognized school of swordsmanship (御留流, odome-ryū).

Two of the Four Hitokiri of the Bakumatsu, Tanaka Shinbei and Kirino Toshiaki, were masters of Yakumaru Jigen-ryū. Kondō Isami, leader of the Shinsengumi, is said to have considered Yakumaru Jigen-ryū especially dangerous and advised his subordinates to dodge Yakumaru strikes rather than attempt to parry them.

During the Bombardment of Kagoshima in 1863, Shimazu Hisamitsu developed a plan to infiltrate two masters of Yakumaru Jigen-ryū, Kaieda Nobuyoshi and Narahara Kizaemon, onto the HMS Euryalus. Disguised as watermelon salesmen, Kaieda and Narahara were to approach the British ship in skiffs before boarding it and killing the entire crew. The plan was cancelled and the skiffs withdrew when British sailors declined the watermelons that were offered.

The main lineage of Yakumaru Jigen-ryū became extinct when Lt. Col. Yakumaru Kanenori II died in the Battle of Okinawa.

== Notable practitioners ==
- Hirata Yukie
- Arimura Jizaemon
- Moriyama Shingozaemon
- Taneda Masaaki
- Shinohara Kunimoto
- Ijichi Masaharu
- Narahara Shigeru
- Nozu Michitsura
- Takashima Tomonosuke
- Shibayama Yahachi
- Tōgō Heihachirō

== See also ==
- Berserker

== Bibliography ==
- 松永 Matsunaga, 守道 Morimichi (1975). Satsuma no hikken — Yakumaru Jigen-ryū 薩摩の秘剣 薬丸自顕流 The Secret Sword of Satsuma — Yakumaru Jigen-ryū. Japan: Published privately.
