= Tose Yosazaemon Osamune =

- Born: Tose Yosazaemon Osamune c. 1540; Hitachi Province
- Died: c. 1600
- Native name: 十瀬 与三左衛門 長宗
- Other names: Also read "Kose" and "Ose"
- Style: Kenjutsu; Iaijutsu; Tenshinsho Jigen Ryu
- Teacher(s): Iizasa Wakasa no Kami Morinobu

Other information
- Notable students: Kaneko Shinkuro Morisada

Tose Yosazaemon Osamune (十瀬 与三左衛門 長宗, c. 1540- c. 1600) was a goshi (land-holding samurai) from Hitachi province in Japan. He is credited with founding the Tenshinsho Jigen Ryu around the Eiroku Era (1558- 1570).

== Biography ==
Tose Yosazaemon Osamune was born in c. 1540 in Hitachi province, Japan (current day Ibaraki Prefecture). He was a land-holding samurai, known as a goshi. While in his early twenties, seeking to enhance his swordsmanship skills, he traveled to Katori Shrine (located in Chiba prefecture) to study under Iizasa Wakasa no Kami Morinobu, the third headmaster of the Tenshin Shoden Katori Shinto Ryu. After five years of training, he received a menkyo kaiden ("license of complete transmission").

After completing his studies under the tutelage of Iizasa Wakasa no Kami Morinobu, Osamune went on to continue his swordsmanship training at Kashima Shrine located in Ibaraki prefecture. It was at this time that Osamune underwent a spiritual ordeal and received, via an oracle, a catalog of martial techniques in a divine inspiration from Takemikazuchi, the god to which the shrine is dedicated to. In addition, he received a vision of technique so swift that with it he could cut a flying swallow out of the air. From this inspiration he named his new system Tenshinsho Jigen Ryu, taking the “Tenshinsho” (true and correct transmission from the deity of Katori Shrine - Futsunushi) from the Tenshin Shoden Katori Shinto Ryu, and adding the term “self-power revelation” (Jigen) which had come to him after his spiritual ordeal at Kashima Shrine.

Although Osamune's menkyo kaiden from the Tenshin Shoden Katori Shinto Ryu included mastery in a variety of weapons, the Tenshinsho Jigen Ryu specializes primarily in swordsmanship.

Osamune's student Kaneko Shinkuro Morisada became his successor as the second headmaster of the Tenshinsho Jigen Ryu.

Osamune died in c. 1600.
