= Abe ryū =

Abe-ryū (安倍流) Abe-ryū Kendo (安倍立剣道)
- Ko-ryū

Foundation
- Founder: Abe Yoritou 安倍頼任 (1624–1693)
- Date founded: 1667
- Period founded: Early Edo period

Arts taught
- Art: Description
- Kenjutsu: Sword art

Ancestor schools
- Shinkage-ryū; Taisha-ryū (タイ捨流); En-ryū (円流)

Abe ryū (安倍流, Abe-ryū) or Abe-tate-ryū (安倍立流), also known as Abe-ryū Kendō (安倍立剣道, Aberyukendo), is a Japanese sword school founded by Abe Yoritō (安倍頼任) in the 17th century. Abe was a disciple of Taisha-ryū, an offshoot of Shinkage-ryū. He was considered a Kengō (great swordsman) and instructor to the Akizuki-han in Chikuzen Province.

The Abe ryū is known as the first major school of kenjutsu to use the term kendō (剣道) in 1673, although the characters had also been used earlier in China. Kendō, or ken no michi, "the way of the sword", describes the teachings of his ryū which emphasized mental and moral practice rather than physical techniques. There is no direct connection between the Abe-ryū usage of kendō and the kendo practiced today.
