= Indō Yoriyasu =

Japanese samurai

Indō Yoriyasu (犬童 頼安, 1521 – December 6, 1606) was a Japanese samurai of the Sengoku period through early Edo period, who served as a retainer of the Sagara clan. His son Sagara Seibei also served sagara clan.
