= Kaneko Shinkuro Morisada =

- Born: Kaneko Shinkuro Morisada c. 1520
- Died: c. 1585
- Native name: 金子 新九郎 盛貞
- Style: Kenjutsu; Iaijutsu; Tenshinsho Jigen Ryu
- Teacher(s): Tose Yosazaemon Osamune

Other information
- Notable students: Terasaka Yakuro Masatsune (Zenkitsu)

Kaneko Shinkuro Morisada (金子 新九郎 盛貞, c. 1520- c. 1585) was a direct student of Tose Yosazaemon Osamune the founder of the Tenshinsho Jigen Ryu. Kaneko later succeeded Osamune in becoming the second headmaster (soke) of the Tenshinsho Jigen Ryu. His best student was a warrior named Terasaka Yakuro Masatsune, who later became the monk Zenkitsu.

Kaneko's student Terasaka Yakuro Masatsune (Zenkitsu) became his successor as the third headmaster of the Tenshinsho Jigen Ryu.

Kaneko died in c. 1585.
