= Taisha Ryu =

Japanese martial art

Taisha-ryū (タイ捨流) also known as Hyōhō Taisha-ryū Kenjutsu (兵法タイ捨流剣術)
- Ko-ryū
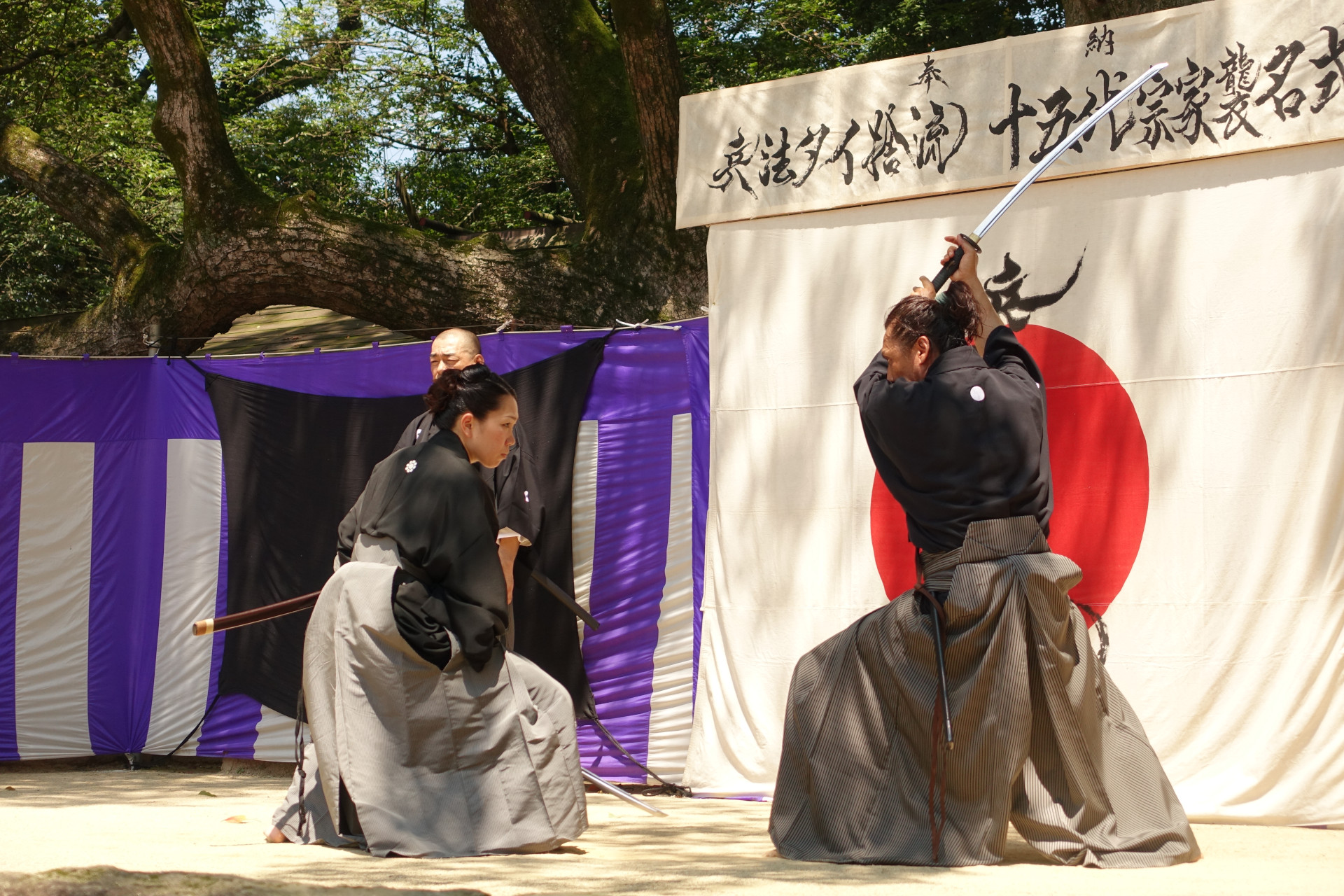
- Uehara Eriko sōke (15th headmaster) demonstrating short sword technique with Yamamoto Takahiro shihan (master instructor) - Photo by Hyōhō Taisha-ryū Ryūsenkan

Foundation
- Founder: Marume Kurando no suke Nagayoshi (丸目蔵人佐長恵), c.1540–c.1629)
- Period founded: Tenshō era (天正) 1573-1592
- Location founded: Hitoyoshi Domain (人吉藩)

Current information
- Current headmaster: Uehara Eriko Fujiwara Hidesada (上原エリ子藤原英定), born c.20th century)
- Current headquarters: Yatsushiro, Kumamoto (八代 熊本県)

Arts taught
- Art: Description
- Kenjutsu: Art of sword fighting
- Battōjutsu: Art of drawing the sword
- Bōjutsu: Art of stick fighting

Ancestor schools
- Shinkage-ryū

Hyōhō Taisha-ryū (兵法タイ捨流) is a traditional Japanese martial arts school (koryū). It was founded by Marume Kurando in the late 16th century in the Hitoyoshi domain (nowadays Kumamoto Prefecture) and its teachings center around Japanese swordsmanship. The school is still taught today in an unbroken lineage, with its headquarters at the Ryū-Sen-Kan Dōjō, in Yatsushiro City, Kumamoto Prefecture.

== History ==
=== Beginnings ===
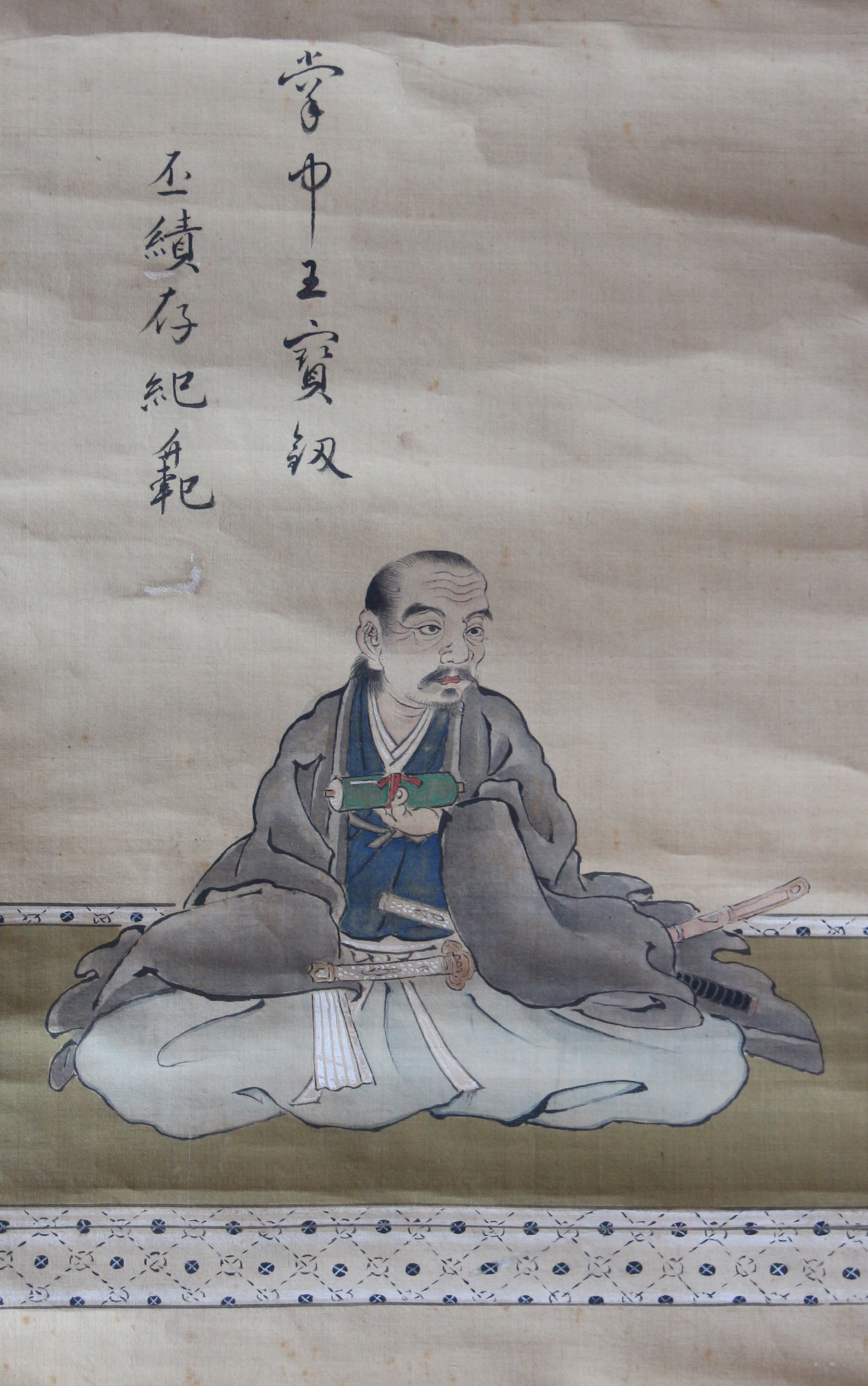
Portrait of the founder Marume Iwami no kami Nyūdō Tessai Fujiwara Nagayoshi. Photo courtesy of Marume family

Marume Kurando (aka Marume Kurando no suke Nagayoshi) was born in 1540 in Yatsushiro. Like his father, he became a samurai retainer of the Sagara clan, who controlled the Hitoyoshi domain at the time. As a boy, he received standard education in the Confucian classics and the arts of war. Marume first proved his prowess in battle at the age of sixteen. To foster him, the young warrior was sent to Kyoto when he was nineteen years old to further hone his skills.

In the capital, Marume met the famous sword master Kamiizumi Ise no Kami Nobutsuna. Seeing a chance to make a name for himself he challenged Kamiizumi to a duel. However, Marume was easily defeated. Afterwards, Marume became the student of Kamiizumi, learning from him the art of the sword.

Kamiizumi propagated a style he had developed himself called Shinkage-ryū (新陰流). According to Kamiizumi's own words transmitted in a diploma awarded to Yagyū Muneyoshi, he had studied various styles, but took the largest part of his inspiration from Kage-ryū.

Marume Kurando soon proved himself to be an adept student. Kamiizumi chose Marume as uchidachi when demonstrating the techniques of the school in front of Shogun Ashikaga Yoshiteru, while he himself acted as shidachi. In paired practice, uchidachi is usually performed by the more experienced swordsman, which made this a great honour and a public display of the high level of acknowledgement Kamiizumi had for Marume's skills.

In time, Marume Kurando would come to be known as one of the “Four Heavenly Kings” (shitennō) of Shinkage-ryū, along with Hikita Bungoro, Yagyū Muneyoshi, and Anasawa Jyōken. Marume received a certificate of menkyo kaiden (license of full transmission) in 1567.

Marume Kurando returned into the service of the Sagara-clan on Kyushu and started teaching Shinkage-ryū. After Kamiizumi's death Marume changed the name of his style to Shinkage Taisha-ryū, which would later be shortened to Taisha-ryū. The school's teachings became an amalgamation of techniques Marume had received from his teacher, his own philosophy and experiences in battle. After losing Ōkuchi castle to Shimazu Iehisa, he was put under strict house arrest by his Sagara lord as a punishment, thus putting an effective end to his military career. As a result, he made the decision to dedicate his life to swordsmanship. Taisha-ryū established itself as a well-known martial art style around Japan during his lifetime and was adopted by many samurai and even some feudal lords (daimyō) across Kyushu.

In his old age he retreated to the small village of Nishiki, where he continued to practice until his death in 1629.11 Shortly before his passing, Marume named Konose Gunsuke Ōkami Tadayuki (神瀬軍助太神惟幸) to become the second sōke (headmaster) of Taisha-ryū. Until the end of the Edo Period, Taisha-ryū remained the official sword school of the Sagara clan, with its headmasters always in, or around Hitoyoshi.

=== Headmasters ===
1. Founder: Marume Iwami no kami Nyūdō Tesssai Fujiwara Nagayoshi (丸目石見守入道徹斉蔵人佐藤原長恵)
2. Konose Gunsuke Ōkami Tadayuki (神瀬軍助太神惟幸)
3. Sagara Shōjirō Yoritake (相良庄次郎頼武)
4. Sagara Sahei Nagafusa (相良左兵衛長房)
5. Konose Goemon Nyūdō Isai Ōkami Tadanobu (神瀬五右衛門入道牟哉太神惟宜)
6. Oda Shichirouemon Fujiwara Sadanori (小田七郎右衛門 藤原定矩)
7. Oda Sekika Fujiwara Sadanori (小田夕可 藤原定紀)
8. Oda Naozaemon Fujiwara Sadayoshi (小田直左衛門藤原定能)
9. Oda Kindazaemon Fujiwara Sadabumi (小田金駄左衛門藤原定記)
10. Oda Hachirouzaemon Fujiwara Sadanao(小田八郎左衛門藤原定直 )
11. Samuda Chūzō Fujiwara Yoshioki (佐厶田忠蔵藤原良興)
12. Oda Sekika Fujiwara Sadataka (小田夕可藤原定孝)
13. Yamakita Takenori Fujiwara Sadamune (山北 竹任藤原定宗)
14. Kino Takao Fujiwara Sadataka (木野敬夫藤原定敬)
15. Uehara Eriko Fujiwara Hidesada (上原エリ子藤原英定)

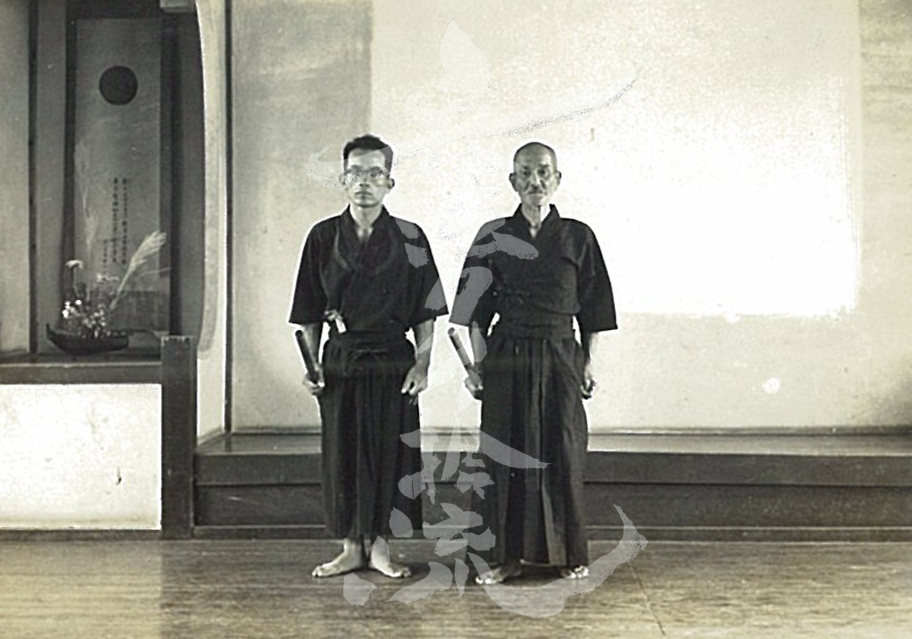
Oda Sekika and Yamakita Takenori – the 12th and 13th generation headmasters of Hyōhō Taisha-ryū. (ca. 1956) - Photo by Hyōhō Taisha-ryū Ryūsenkan

=== Recent history ===
Since Oda Shichirouemon, the sixth headmaster of Taisha-ryū and karō (家老; senior retainer) to the Sagara clan, the school has been led by the Oda family, with the teachings of the school being truthfully handed down the generations.

The 12th headmaster, Oda Sekika, was born in the Meiji era in 1883 and carried the tradition over to the 20th century. In 1962, Taisha-ryū was declared an Intangible Cultural Asset of Kumamoto Prefecture. Oda Sekika taught and appointed his son Yamakita Takenori as the 13th head of the school. Yamakita entrusted the school to his two certified Shihan (master instructors) Yamamoto Takahiro and Tazoe Shin-Ichiro. The tradition was passed down to Yamakita's grandson, who became the 14th headmaster of the school. The current 15th headmaster is Uehara Eriko, the granddaughter of late Yamakita-sensei. She is being supported by the two aforementioned Shihan.

Today, Hyoho Taisha-ryū has its headquarters at the Dōjō Ryū-Sen-Kan in Yatsushiro, Kumamoto. Furthermore, several study groups have been installed in- and outside of Japan.

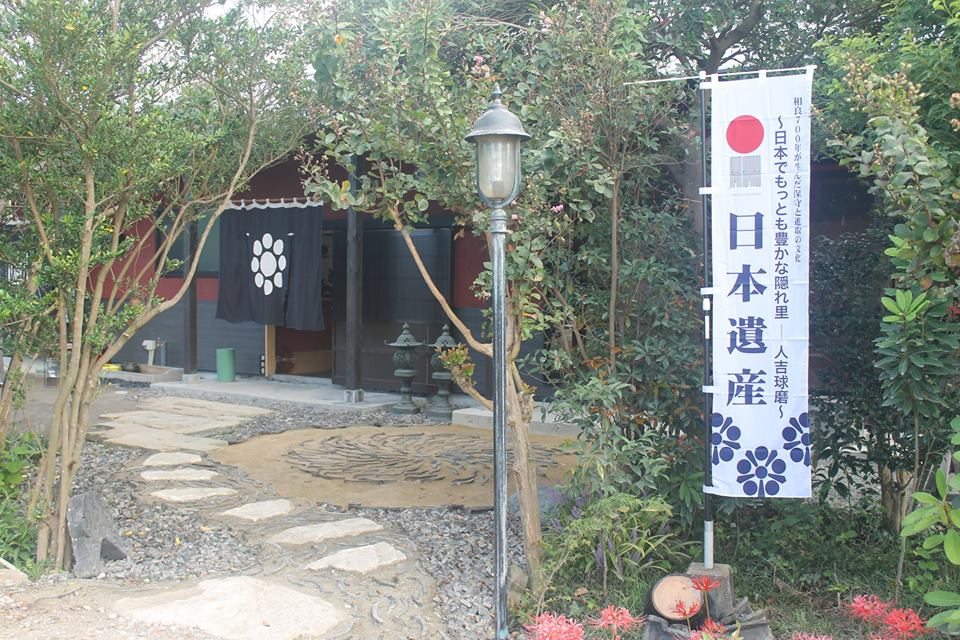
The Dōjō Ryū-Sen-Kan in Yatsushiro, Kumamoto - Photo by Hyōhō Taisha-ryū Ryūsenkan

== Characteristics of the style ==
Taisha-ryū teaches unique kamae (stances) and reihō (etiquette). Its stances and movement are adapted to battlefield conditions, taking uneven ground and various obstacles into consideration. The style combines swordsmanship with kicking, joint locks, or attacks to the eyes.

Today, the school's curriculum includes swordsmanship, as well as some staff techniques (bōjutsu).

The techniques are organized as follows:

- paired forms performed with wooden swords (bokken kata), for both a long sword (ōdachi) and a short sword (kodachi)
- sword drawing forms (iai kata)
- paired forms with katana (kumitachi kata)
- secret techniques, or inner mysteries of the school (ōgi)

A special characteristic of the school is the use of fukuro-shinai (袋竹刀), a bamboo sword wrapped in leather, said to have been developed by Kamiizumi Ise no Kami, which allows for full contact sparring without the danger of (major) injuries.

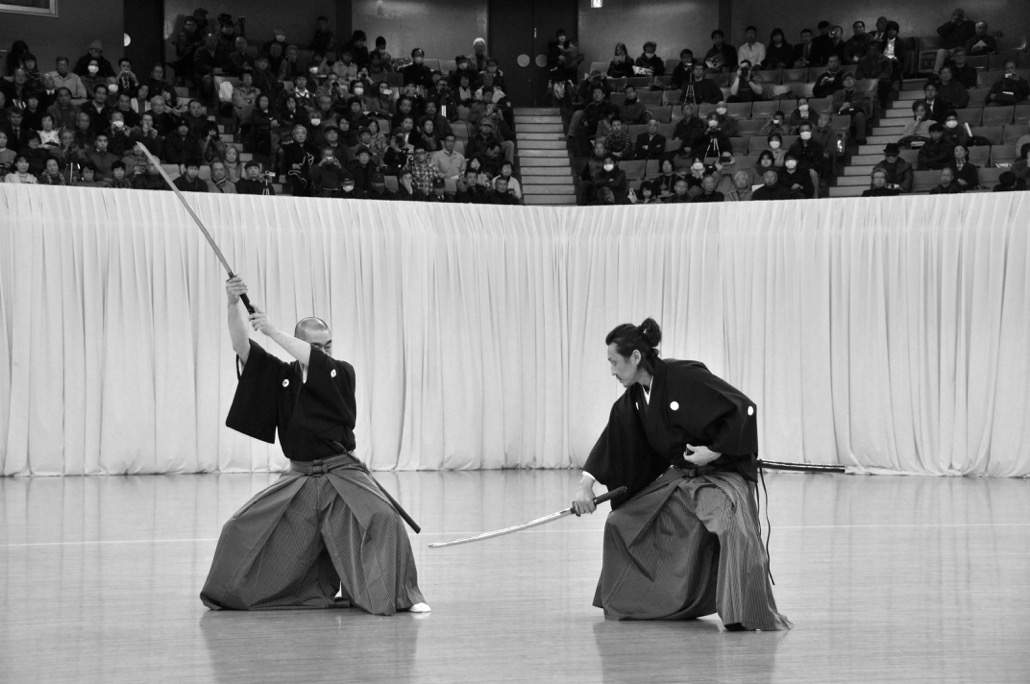
Master instructors Tazoe Shin-Ichiro (left) and Yamamoto Takahiro demonstrating at the Nippon Budōkan in Tokyo. - Photo by Hyōhō Taisha-ryū Ryūsenkan

=== The meaning of Taisha ===
The name of the school is unique among Japanese martial traditions. Usually these names are composed of a combination of kanji, i.e. logographic Han characters. However, the name of Taisha-ryū (タイ捨流) uses both kanji and katakana, a Japanese syllabary. While kanji are always attributed a certain meaning, katakana characters have only a phonetic value, without giving clues as to the meaning of the phrase.

“タイ – /tai/ is written in katakana, with several possible meanings, applying to kanji such as “body” (体), “waiting” (待), “opposing” (対), etc."

“捨 – /sha/ is the kanji, and the meaning can be translated as “discard”, “throw away”, or “abandon”."

As one can see from the examples above, the use of katakana allows the name of the school to have multiple possible interpretations.,

“Not only our school, but also many other traditional martial art styles have standardized forms (kata). There is a very important concept [relating to kata] called wabi “和美” – repeatedly training the routine, manners, and correct skills and mastering them by rooting them in your body. [Thus], we get rid of unnecessary movement and habits – this is the concept of sabi “差美.” The meaning of “kata” in our style is to [develop] the natural body (shizentai) based on this “wabi sabi” concept. We train hard every day with the aim to achieve beautiful and strong “kata.”

"Nature has two faces: the beauty of Nature, of the sunset, of the sunrise, and of the majestic mountain - you see it and you think: “Ah, it's beautiful!”, but Nature is also destructive and has great power which humans cannot hope to achieve or overcome. Like the floods in Kumamoto. It is the same thing. These two faces [of Nature] form what is the true natural body (shizentai). Similarly, during a demonstration (enbu), when one has a natural posture (shisei) people looking from the side will say: “Oh, how beautiful, what a beautiful movement!”, but at the same time the sword swings are powerful and scary. This is how we practice the natural body (shizentai) and its meaning within Taisha-ryū.”

— https://martialvideoprod.wixsite.com/officiel/copie-de-entretien-takahiro-yamamot
