= Tōgō Shigekata =

Samurai

- Born: 1560; Satsuma Domain
- Died: 1643
- Native name: 東郷 重位
- Other names: Tōgō Jūi; Tōgō Tōbee Shigekata 東郷 藤兵衛 重位; Tōgō Hizen-no-Kami Shigekata 東郷 肥前守 重位
- Style: Kenjutsu; Iaijutsu; Jigen Ryu
- Teacher(s): Terasaka Yakuro Masatsune (Tenshinsho Jigen Ryu); Marume Nagayoshi (Taisha Ryu)

Tōgō Tōbee Shigekata (東郷 藤兵衛 重位, 1560- 1643) was a direct student of Terasaka Yakuro Masatsune, the third headmaster of the Tenshinsho Jigen Ryu (自顕, Jigen), and of Marume Nagayoshi, founder of the Taisha Ryu.Tōgō was a samurai from the Satsuma domain credited with founding the Jigen Ryu (示現, Jigen).

== Biography ==
Tōgō Shigekata was born in 1560 in Satsuma, Japan (current day Kagoshima Prefecture). He had his first battlefield experience in 1577 at the Battle of Mimigawa when he was seventeen years old. In his twenties, Tōgō came under the tutelage of Marume Nagayoshi, the founder the Taisha Ryu and quickly mastered the system where he was then initiated into the gokui (secrets) of the tradition.

In 1588, Tōgō accompanied Shimazu Yoshihiro (Lord of the Satsuma domain) to Kyoto where he met a Buddhist monk that went by the name of Zenkitsu. (Zenkitsu's given name was Terasaka Yakuro Masatsune) Zenkitsu was the chief priest of Tenneiji Temple and third headmaster of the Tenshisho Jigen Ryu. Under Zenkitsu's guidance, Tōgō mastered the Tenshinsho Jigen Ryu in less than a year.

Tōgō would return to Satsuma where he trained in the Tenshinsho Jigen Ryu for three years before combining his studies to create the Jigen Ryu.

Tōgō’s renaming of his school was based on an insight he gained by performing religious austerities (shugyo). While meditating on a section of the Lotus Sutra, Shigekata became inspired by the phrase “jigen jintsuriki” (示現神通力, a sudden revelation of divine power). He therefore changed the characters of Jigen Ryu from jigen (自顕, self-power revelation) to a set of characters from the Buddhist text- jigen (示現, sudden revelation). In this sense, jigen indicates the use by a buddha of a “manifest form” in order to teach sentient beings.

At the age of 44, Tōgō became the chief swordsmanship instructor for the Satsuma domain.

Tōgō died in 1643.
