= Marume Nagayoshi =

Samurai in Japan's Sengoku period

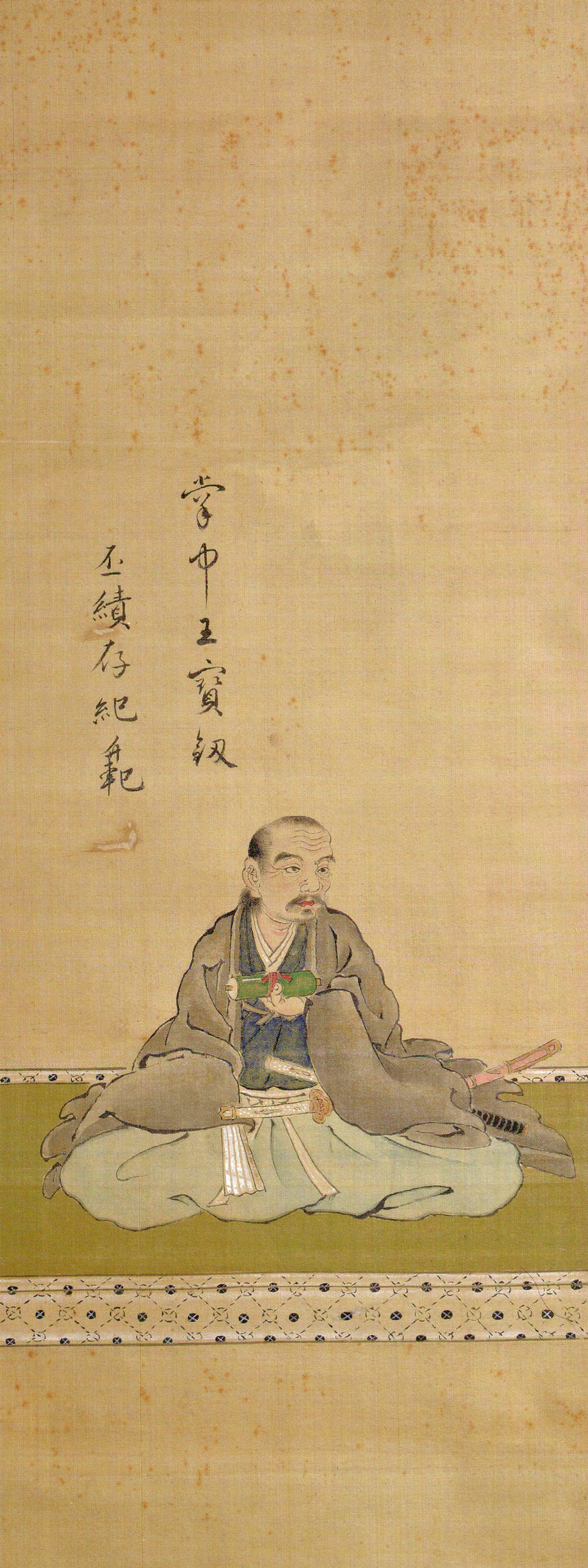
Marume Kurando

Marume Nagayoshi (丸目 長恵, 1540–1629) was a retainer of the Sagara clan in the Sengoku period and a swordsman in the early Edo period. He was considered one of the best pupils of Kamiizumi Nobutsuna, and went on to found the Taisha ryū school. He was sometimes known as Kurandonosuke and also as Ishimi Mamoru, but was best known as Marume Nagayoshi, which he was called in kōdan. His original name was Fujiwara, and his art name was Tessai. In his later years he shaved his head and went by the name of Ishimi Nyūdō Tessai.

== Life ==
Marume was born in 1540 in Yatsushiro District, Higo Province (modern-day Hitoyoshi, Yatsushiro City, Kumamoto Prefecture). His father was Marume Yozaemon and it is said that his mother was a woman from Akaike Izu. When the Satsuma army attacked Ōhata in 1555, he fought alongside his father, earning recognition for his military prowess in his first battle. They both received the name Marume, their former one said to have been Yamamoto.

In 1556, he underwent military training by Amakusa Izu Mamoru, the lord of Amakusa Province and Hondo Castle.

He went to Kyoto in 1558, studying fencing under Kamiizumi Nobutsuna, the founder of Shinkage-ryū. Later on, when the Muromachi shōgun, Ashikaga Yoshiteru, saw a fencing performance by Kamiizumi with which Marume assisted, Yoshiteru gave them both a letter of commendation. They gave the same demonstration to Emperor Ōgimachi, and so the Honchō bugei shōden records Nagayoshi as being a warrior of the north side of the imperial court, although it has not been confirmed as to whether he actually was in imperial service.

Returning to his home town, Nagayoshi taught the Shinkage-ryū style for the Sagara clan. In 1566, he once again went to Kyoto taking along his students Marume Jusai, Marume Kihē and Kino Kurōzaemon, but Kamiizumi was visiting his native Kōzuke Province at the time. Nagayoshi put up notices at Mount Atago, Seigan-ji temple and Kiyomizu-dera temple. They challenged martial artists and passersby to a real sword fight with swordsman from the best style in all the land, but nobody came forward and Nagayoshi returned home without having a duel. In 1567, Kamiizumi, who had learnt of what happened in Kyoto, awarded him (under the name Kamiizumi Isenokami Nobutsuna) a menkyo kaiden that recognised Nagayoshi as 'master of the killing sword' and 'master of the life-saving sword'.

Once again returning home, Nagayoshi performed government service for the Sagara clan, but when Shimazu Iehisa of the Shimazu clan attacked Ōkuchi Castle, the Sagara clan, for whom Nagayoshi was choosing strategy, were defeated. Many officers and soldiers were killed, and Ōkuchi Castle was taken. After this defeat, Sagara placed the blame on Nagayoshi's shoulders, sentencing him to the severe punishment of hissoku, a kind of house arrest. His dreams of becoming a military commander effectively ended.

Following this, Nagayoshi focused exclusively on swordsmanship. He defeated different schools across Kyushu, and when Kamiizumi learnt of this he entrusted Nagayoshi as the teacher of Shinkage-ryū in western Japan. Nagayoshi once again travelled to Kyoto along with his students to study Kamiizumi's newly developed techniques, but upon their arrival he had already died. It is said that a dejected Nagayoshi returned home and, after several years of training night and day, he opened his 'Taisha ryū' school.

The Sagara, who had already surrendered to the Shimazu, now only controlled Kuma District in Higo Province and had also sworn allegiance to Toyotomi Hideyoshi. In 1587, the disfavour towards Nagayoshi had eased, and he once more began to serve under the Sagara clan, being paid 117 koku as an initial salary to teach his Taisha ryū style.

Taisha ryū spread throughout Kyushu, and not only amongst members of the Sagara clan, but also many members of other clans. Among them were the military commanders Kamachi Akihiro and Tachibana Muneshige, with secret techniques being passed on to the former.

In his later years, Nagayoshi assumed the art name 'Tessai', and it is said he spent his life reclusively, whilst pursuing the cultivation of Kiriharano (in Nishiki). Nagayoshi had ability not only in kenjutsu, but also sōjutsu, naginatajutsu, equestrianism, shuriken and ninjutsu. It is also said that Nagayoshi was a man of culture who excelled in things like calligraphy, waka, dancing and the flute.

He died in 1629. His grave is in Kiriharano Dōzan, Nishiki, Kuma District, Kumamoto.

== See also ==
- Denrinbō Raikei
