= Sagara Haruhiro =

Daimyo who ruled a region in Higo Province

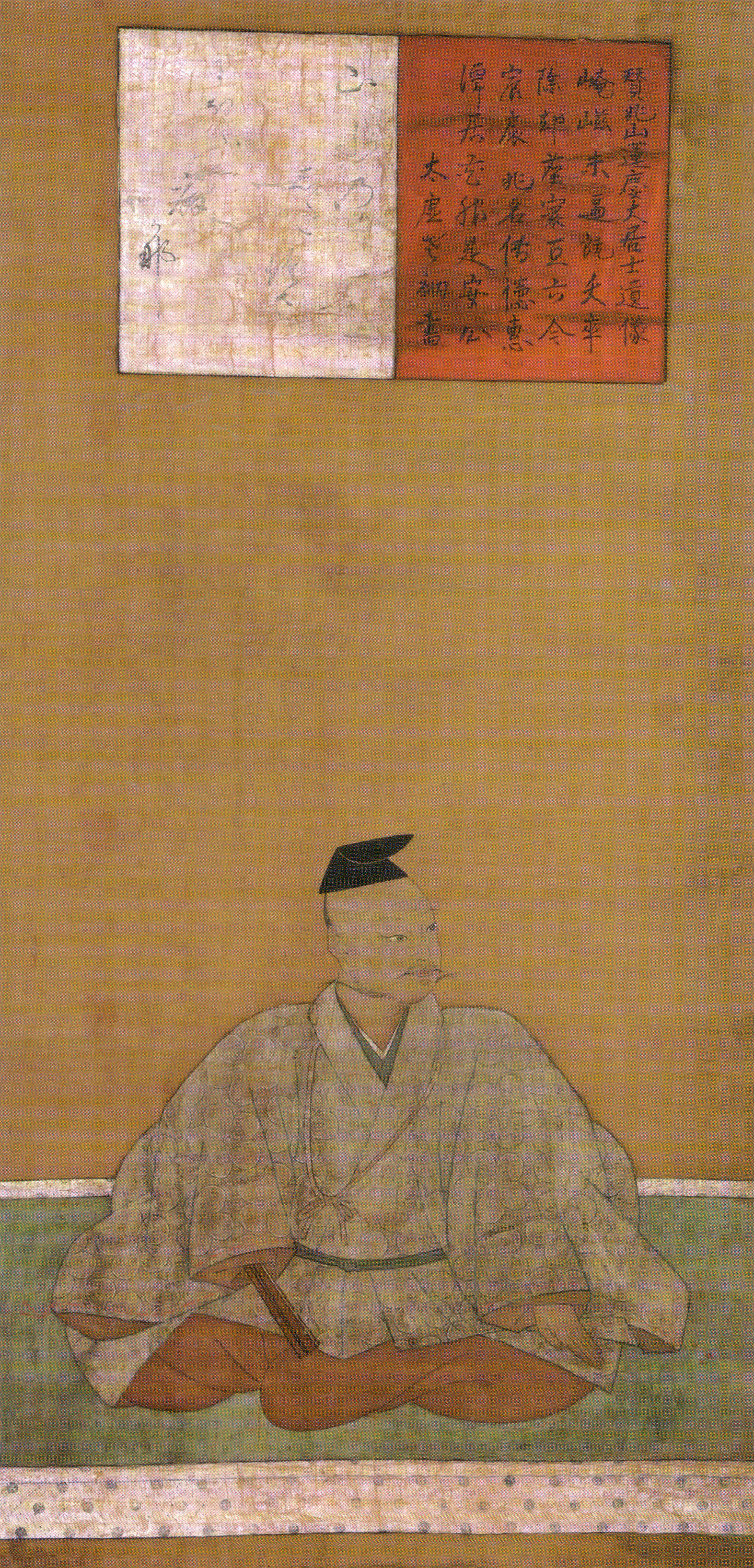
Sagara Haruhiro

Sagara Haruhiro (相良晴広) (1513–1555) was a Japanese daimyō of the Sengoku period, who ruled a region in Higo Province. He was adopted to Sagara Yoshishige and became the head of the Sagara clan.
