= Jigen-ryū =

Japanese martial arts

Jigen-ryū (示現流)
- Ko-ryū

Foundation
- Founder: Tōgō Shigekata 東郷 重位
- Period founded: late 16th century

Current information
- Current headmaster: Tōgō Shigenori 東郷重徳

Arts taught
- Art: Description
- Kenjutsu - ōdachi: Sword art - long sword

Ancestor schools
- Tenshinsho Jigen Ryu; Taisha Ryu

Descendant schools
- Yakumaru Jigen-ryū

Jigen-ryū (示現流 lit. 'sudden revelation style') is a traditional school (koryū) of Japanese martial arts founded in the late 16th century by Tōgō Shigekata (1560–1643) in Satsuma Province, now Kagoshima prefecture, Kyushu, Japan. It focuses mainly on the art of swordsmanship.

== Summary ==
Jigen-ryū is known for its emphasis on the first strike: Jigen-ryū teachings state that a second strike is not even to be considered.

The basic technique is to hold the sword in a high version of hasso-no-kamae called tonbo-no-kamae (蜻蛉構 Dragonfly Stance), with the sword held vertically above the right shoulder. The attack is then done by running forward at your opponent and then cutting diagonally down on their neck. The kiai is a loud "Ei!".

Traditionally, this is practised using a long wooden stick, and cutting against a vertical pole, or even a real tree. During a hard practice, the wood is said to give off the smell of smoke. During the Edo period, at the height of its popularity, adepts of Jigen-ryū were said to practice striking the pole 3,000 times in the morning, and another 8,000 times in the afternoon. The style is also famous for its impressive kiai known as the Enkyō (猿叫; lit. 'monkey's scream').

The style is still taught at the Jigen-ryū practice hall in the city of Kagoshima.

== See also ==
- Zornhau
