= Akasaka Yakuro Masatsune =

Japanese priest (1567–1594)

- Born: Akasaka Yakuro Masatsune; 1567
- Died: 1594 (aged 26–27)
- Native name: 赤坂 弥九郎 政雅
- Other names: Zenkitsu, Zenkichi (善吉)
- Style: Kenjutsu; Iaijutsu; Tenshinsho Jigen Ryu
- Teacher: Kaneko Shinkuro Morisada

Other information
- Notable students: Togo Shigekata

Akasaka Yakuro Masatsune (赤坂 弥九郎 政雅, 1567–1594) was a direct student of Kaneko Shinkuro Morisada, the second headmaster of the Tenshinsho Jigen Ryu. Akasaka is better known by his Buddhist dharma name- Zenkitsu (善吉, also read Zenkichi). He was the chief priest at the Buddhist temple Tenneiji of the Soto Zen School, located not far from Kuramadera near Kyoto.

Zenkitsu later succeeded Kaneko in becoming the third headmaster (soke) of the Tenshinsho Jigen Ryu. His best student was a samurai from the Satsuma domain, Togo Shigekata, whom he taught between 1588-1589. In less than a year, Shigekata would master the Tenshinsho Jigen Ryu and synthesize it with the Taisha Ryu to create the Jigen Ryu.

Zenkitsu died in c. 1594.
