= Akaike Nagatō =

- 赤池 長任
- Born: Akaike Nagatō; 1529; Japan
- Died: 1568 (aged 38–39); Japan
- Military career
- Rank: Sumurai (lord of Akaike Castle)
- Conflicts: Battle of Dō-ga-saki

Akaike Nagatō (赤池 長任; 1529–1568) was a Japanese samurai of the Sengoku period who served the Sagara clan of southern Kyūshū and held the court title of Izu no Kami (伊豆守). The lord of Akaike Castle in Higo Province, Akaike achieved fame at the fight at Ōkuchi Castle in 1568, when he defeated the forces of Shimazu Yoshihiro at the Battle of Dō-ga-saki.
