= Sagara clan =

Samurai clan

Sagara clan 相良氏
- Mon: Sagara Umebachi
- Home province: Higo; Totomi
- Parent house: Fujiwara
- Titles: Lord of Hitoyoshi; Viscount
- Founder: Sagara Korekane
- Ruled until: 1872
- Cadet branches: Imamura clan

The Sagara clan (相良氏, Sagara-shi) was a Japanese samurai clan of daimyos. They were a tactical ally of the Shimazu clan.

In the Edo period, they became the daimyo of the Hitoyoshi Domain and ruled until the Meiji Restoration. After the restoration, they were appointed Viscount.

== Origins ==
The Sagara clan was founded by Sagara Korekane, descending from the Fujiwara clan. It is believed that the clan took its name from the manor (shōen) they held in Sagara, Haibara District, Tōtōmi Province during the Kamakura period.

== History ==
The Sagara clan was, in the Edo period, a tozama daimyō clan which ruled the Hitoyoshi Domain in Higo Province. The domain boasted land worth of 22,000 koku. In 1198, the year before his death, Minamoto no Yoritomo granted the territory of Hitoyoshi (on Kyushu, in modern-day Kumamoto prefecture) to the Sagara clan. Hitoyoshi is surrounded on all sides by mountains, making it quite easily defensible, and allowing the Sagara to relatively easily survive their neighbors' attacks during the Sengoku period.

Sagara Nagatsune initially fought alongside the Western Army (against Tokugawa Ieyasu) at the Battle of Sekigahara, but secretly sent an envoy to Ieyasu declaring his allegiance. When Ieyasu's forces laid siege to Nagatsune's Ôgaki castle, he granted the attackers entry, thus earning him some relief from Tokugawa enmity. After contributing as well to Tokugawa efforts during the Siege of Osaka, he earned a high reputation for his clan.

After the Meiji Restoration and the abolition of the han system, members of the Sagara clan were appointed hereditary nobility Kazoku with the title of Viscount.

== Clan heads ==
1. Sagara Yorifusa
2. Sagara Yorihiro
3. Sagara Yoritaka
4. Sagara Yoritomi
5. Sagara Nagaoki
6. Sagara Nagaari
7. Sagara Yorimine
8. Sagara Yorihisa
9. Sagara Akinaga
10. Sagara Yorisada
11. Sagara Tomimochi
12. Sagara Nagahiro
13. Sagara Yorinori
14. Sagara Yoriyuki
15. Sagara Nagatomi
16. Sagara Yorimoto
17. Sagara Haruhiro
18. Sagara Yoshihi

== Vassal ==
- Indō Yoriyasu
- Akaike Nagatō
- Marume Nagayoshi
- Fukami Nagamoto
