= Tenshinsho Jigen Ryu =

Traditional Japanese school of swordsmanship

Tenshinshō Jigen-ryū (天真正自顕流)
- Ko-ryū

Foundation
- Founder: Tose Yosazaemon Osamune (十瀬与三左衛門長宗)
- Date founded: Eiroku era (1558–1570)
- Period founded: Muromachi period
- Location founded: Hitachi Province, Japan

Arts taught
- Art: Description
- Kenjutsu: Swordsmanship
- Iaijutsu: Quick-draw Sword Art

Ancestor schools
- Tenshin Shōden Katori Shintō-ryū

Descendant schools
- Jigen-ryū, Ryushin Shouchi Ryu

Tenshinshō Jigen-ryū (天真正自顕流) is a school of Japanese swordsmanship specializing in kenjutsu. Its founding is traditionally attributed to Tose Yosazaemon Osamune (十瀬与三左衛門長宗) during the Eiroku era (1558–1570). The school is associated with Tenshin Shōden Katori Shintō-ryū and influenced the development of Jigen-ryū in the Satsuma domain.

During the twentieth century, the tradition underwent significant development under Ueno Yasuyuki Genshin (1913–1973), who expanded its curriculum by incorporating techniques from several Japanese martial arts schools. The modern system became known as Tenshinshō Jigen Ryū Heihō (天眞正自源流兵法).

== History ==
=== Origins and historical traditions ===
The origins of Tenshinshō Jigen-ryū are traditionally associated with Tose Yosazaemon Osamune (十瀬与三左衛門長宗, c. 1540–1600), a swordsman from Hitachi Province. The establishment of the school is commonly associated with the Eiroku era (1558–1570).

According to traditional accounts, Tose studied Tenshin Shōden Katori Shintō-ryū under Iizasa Wakasa no Kami Morinobu, the third headmaster of that tradition. Following his training at Katori Shrine, he continued his martial studies at Kashima Shrine, where he is said to have experienced a spiritual revelation that influenced the development of his swordsmanship.

The tradition was subsequently transmitted to Kaneko Shinkurō Morisada (金子新九郎盛貞, c. 1520–1585), traditionally recognized as the second headmaster, and later to Akasaka Yakurō Masatsune (赤坂弥九郎政雅, 1567–1594), also known by his Buddhist name Zenkitsu.

Akasaka is associated with the transmission of Tenshinshō Jigen-ryū to Tōgō Shigekata (東郷重位, 1560–1643), a swordsman from Satsuma who subsequently developed Jigen-ryū through the incorporation of techniques and principles from Tenshinshō Jigen-ryū and Taisha-ryū.

An alternative traditional chronology dates the establishment of Tenshinshō Jigen-ryū to 1508 (Eishō 5), attributing its foundation to Tose (Kose) Yozaemon no Jō Osamune, later known as Setoguchi Bizen no Kami Masamoto.

The tradition is said to have been transmitted privately for approximately 400 years, remaining largely unknown outside its practitioners until the Meiji period or later.

The differing founding chronologies have not been conclusively reconciled, and details of the school's early transmission are preserved primarily through traditional accounts rather than continuous contemporary documentation.

=== Postwar development under Ueno Yasuyuki Genshin ===
Ueno Yasuyuki Genshin (上野靖之源心, 1913–1973) was born in Kagoshima, where he was introduced to Yakumaru Jigen-ryū and kendō. He continued his martial studies throughout his youth before entering military service during the 1930s.

Following his return from Manchuria in 1945, Ueno became involved in efforts to preserve and promote Japanese martial arts during the postwar period.

Ueno maintained relationships with several prominent martial artists, including Nakajima Katsujirō, Nakajima Shōhitsu, Minaki Saburō, and Kobashi Nikkon. These individuals were associated with the preservation and development of classical Japanese martial arts during a period of significant cultural change.

He participated in the activities of the Zen Nippon Kobudō Renmei (全日本古武道連盟, All Japan Classical Martial Arts Federation), serving as director of its Kantō regional office. The organization sought to preserve and promote classical Japanese martial arts through cooperation among practitioners and instructors.

Ueno also collaborated with Sugino Yoshio (杉野嘉男, 1904–1998), an instructor of Tenshin Shōden Katori Shintō-ryū, in choreographing period television dramas.

=== The Shōbukan and modernization of the curriculum ===
In 1964, Ueno was appointed chief director and kendō instructor at the Shōbukan (尚武館), a martial arts training center established in Asakusa, Tokyo, under the patronage of Prince Kaya Tsunenori (1900–1978).

The Shōbukan became an important center for the public instruction and development of Tenshinshō Jigen-ryū.

Drawing upon his earlier training in Kagoshima, including Yakumaru Jigen-ryū, kendō, and other regional traditions, Ueno substantially expanded the school's curriculum. His approach incorporated elements from 28 martial arts schools into the development of the modern system.

The resulting curriculum emphasized circular, one-handed sword-drawing movements, often beginning from iaigoshi, with the sword positioned horizontally at the hip and its cutting edge facing outward.

Ueno also modified methods of chiburi and nōtō to facilitate the immediate return of the sword to its scabbard following a cutting technique. In addition to solo iaijutsu kata, he developed several series of paired iaijutsu and kenjutsu exercises based on his experience with different martial arts traditions.

The curriculum was organized into three principal categories:

- Tanren (鍛練): Fundamental solo exercises, including suburi, battō-nōtō, and tategiuchi.
- Hōkei (方形): Solo iaijutsu kata.
- Kumitachi (組太刀): Paired swordsmanship forms, generally performed using wooden swords.

Ueno also advocated the complementary practice of kendō and tameshigiri (test cutting), considering these disciplines important for developing a comprehensive understanding of swordsmanship.

=== Development of Tenshinshō Jigen Ryū Heihō ===
During the postwar development of the school, Ueno revised the Japanese characters used to represent its name.

The earlier tradition was written Tenshinshō Jigen-ryū (天真正自顕流), using the characters 自顕 for Jigen. Ueno adopted the characters 自源, retaining the same pronunciation while introducing a different philosophical emphasis.

The character 源 (gen) signifies a source or origin. The revised name emphasized the fundamental origins of martial principles and techniques, reflecting Ueno's approach to developing a comprehensive system of swordsmanship.

The adoption of 自源 also distinguished the evolving modern curriculum from the earlier tradition, while maintaining its historical connection to Tenshinshō Jigen-ryū.

The name Tenshinshō Jigen Ryū Heihō (天眞正自源流兵法) was subsequently formalized under Ueno Fumiyasu Kagenori, incorporating heihō (兵法, martial strategy) and the older character 眞 in place of 真.

=== Publications ===
Ueno authored two books addressing Japanese swordsmanship and martial arts history.

In 1965, he published Iaidō Hōten (居合道寶典), a manual covering the philosophy, etiquette, history, and technical practice of iaidō. The publication included technical material concerning Ishin-ryū, Shin Shin Musō-ryū, and Eishin-ryū.

The following year, he published Kendō Kyōten (剣道教典), which addressed kendō fundamentals, training methods, philosophy, and the history of Japanese swordsmanship schools.

These publications document Ueno's approach to martial arts instruction and his interest in preserving Japanese swordsmanship traditions.

=== Succession following Ueno Genshin ===
Ueno became ill in 1970, eventually leading to the closure of the Shōbukan. He died on May 23, 1973, leaving two sons, Ueno Fumiyasu and Ueno Takashi.

Following his death, Shimizu Tadatsugu (清水忠次, 1921–1998) and Kawabata Terutaka (河端照孝, born 1940), both students of Ueno, helped maintain the tradition during the period before his sons assumed leadership.

Shimizu was a martial artist and swordsmith involved in the preservation and appreciation of Japanese swords. Kawabata also maintained a professional interest in Japanese swordsmanship and sword appreciation.

Kawabata continued training and promoting the tradition following Ueno's death, eventually receiving menkyo kaiden, a certificate of complete transmission.

In 1982, Ueno Fumiyasu Kagenori established the Sōgō Budō Genshinkai (総合武道源心会) in Saitama Prefecture in honor of his father. The organization continued the teaching of kendō and Tenshinshō Jigen-ryū, maintaining the technical principles developed by Ueno Genshin.

Kawabata subsequently established an independent school, Ryūshin Jigen-ryū, in 2006. The school was renamed Ryushin Shouchi Ryu in 2011 and continued to develop its own curriculum and organizational structure.

=== International development and modern succession ===
In 2006, Ueno Fumiyasu and his younger brother, Ueno Takashi, traveled to the United States to participate in an international martial arts event. Their activities contributed to the subsequent establishment of affiliated schools in North America and Europe.

In 2009, Ueno Fumiyasu appointed Ueno Takashi Dōshin as his successor and chief director of the Sōgō Budō Genshinkai.

The Ueno succession identifies Ueno Yasuyuki Genshin as the 27th headmaster, Ueno Fumiyasu Kagenori as the 28th, and Ueno Takashi Dōshin as the 29th.

Other organizations have subsequently presented differing accounts of the school's leadership and succession. A Tokyo-based organization identified Takahashi Tamon as the 30th headmaster in 2019, while later organizational statements described a transition toward leadership by a council of instructors.

These developments have resulted in separate organizational lines associated with the transmission of Tenshinshō Jigen Ryū Heihō.
