= The Sea and Poison (film) =

- DVD cover
- Directed by: Kei Kumai
- Written by: Kei Kumai
- Based on: The Sea and Poison by Shūsaku Endō
- Produced by: Shūsaku Endō; Kei Kumai; Takayoshi Miyagawa; Kazu Otsuka; Keiichiro Takishima
- Starring: Eiji Okuda; Ken Watanabe; Takahiro Tamura; Kyōko Kishida; Mikio Narita
- Cinematography: Masao Tochizawa
- Edited by: Osamu Inoue
- Music by: Teizo Matsumura
- Production companies: The Sea and Poison Production Committee
- Distributed by: Kadokawa
- Release dates: October 17, 1986 (Japan); July 22, 1987 (United States)
- Running time: 123 minutes
- Country: Japan
- Language: Japanese

The Sea and Poison (Japanese: 海と毒薬, Hepburn: Umi to Dokuyaku) is a 1986 Japanese black and white drama film written and directed by Kei Kumai and based on a novel of the same name by Shūsaku Endō. It tells the true story of downed American pilots in World War II who are vivisected by Japanese surgeons in the Kyushu Imperial University.

The film has never been released on home video outside of Japan with an English translation. Unofficial translations exist online and can be legally watched with an original Japanese DVD using computer software that allows custom subtitles.

== Plot ==
Eight crew members from a downed B-29 bomber were brought to the Imperial University's medical school. Under military orders, the facility was to conduct experiments involving the vivisection of these American prisoners of war. Can a human being survive the removal of their internal organs? Suguro, a medical researcher forced to participate in this monstrous and inhumane experiment, is tormented by his conscience. Meanwhile, his colleague Toda—who initially sneered at Suguro’s distress—begins to question his own lack of emotional response amidst these extreme circumstances. Caught up in the turmoil, the young researchers find themselves buffeted by the forces at play, including the power struggles within the department.

== Cast ==
- Eiji Okuda as Suguro
- Ken Watanabe as Toda
- Takahiro Tamura as Professor Hashimoto
- Kyōko Kishida as Ohba, Head Nurse
- Mikio Narita as Shibata
- Shigeru Kōyama as Gondo
- Toshie Negishi as Ueda, Nurse
- Ken Nishida as Asai
- Masumi Okada as Hattori
- Noriko Sengoku as Old woman
- Kazunaga Tsuji as Murai
- Masane Tsukayama as Miyasaka

== Production ==
=== Planning ===
Director and screenwriter Kei Kumai submitted his film proposal to Nikkatsu after his 1970 film Apart from Life. However, Nikkatsu was on the brink of bankruptcy at the time, and so he approached various companies, but they shunned him, citing the film as "dark, heavy, and difficult – all three of the major elements that make a film unsuccessful." After more than a decade, a businessman offered to fund the production, and 17 years later, the film was finally produced. Kumai stated, "I was shocked when I read the original novel in 1958, and every time I reread it, the impact is renewed. I fear that the current social climate is reverting to the past, and I want to warn against this with this film."

=== Cinematography ===
Most of the filming took place at the former Tokyo Industrial Laboratory in Hatsudai, which has served as a location for numerous films and TV shows, including MISHIMA and Do-Re-Mi-Fa Girls' Blood is Roaring.

== Awards and nominations ==
60th Kinema Junpo Best Ten Awards

- Won: Best Film
- Won: Best Japanese Film Director

37th Berlin International Film Festival

- Won: Jury Grand Prix

41st Mainichi Film Awards

- Won: Best Film
