= Darkness in the Light (film) =

- Film poster
- Directed by: Kei Kumai
- Screenplay by: Kei Kumai
- Based on: NEWS NEWS by Koichi Hiraishi
- Produced by: Taketo Niitsu; Toyoharu Fukuda; Naoto Sarukawa; Tadao Yutaka
- Starring: Kiichi Nakai; Akira Terao; Naomi Hosokawa; Nagiko Tono; Yukiya Kitamura
- Cinematography: Kazuo Okuhara
- Edited by: Osamu Inoue
- Music by: Teizo Matsumura
- Production company: Nikkatsu
- Distributed by: Nikkatsu
- Release date: 24 March 2001 (Japan)
- Running time: 119 minutes
- Country: Japan
- Language: Japanese
- Box office: ¥250 million

Darkness in the Light (Japanese: 日本の黒い夏 [冤enzai罪], Hepburn: Nippon no Kuroi Natsu - Enzai; lit. Black Summer in Japan: False Charges) is a 2001 Japanese drama film directed by Kei Kumai. The screenplay was written by Kumai, who based it on the play NEWS NEWS by Koichi Hiraishi, which was itself based on the documentary What TV Conveyed produced by the broadcasting department of Matsumoto Misugaoka High School in Nagano. All three tell the story of the real-life Matsumoto sarin attack. The film stars Akira Terao as Toshio Kanbe, a man falsely accused of the attack, in addition to Kiichi Nakai, Naomi Hosokawa, Nagiko Tono and Yukiya Kitamura in supporting roles. The film's score was composed by Teizo Matsumura. Darkness in the Light was theatrically released by Nikkatsu on 24 March 2001, in Japan. It was also shown at the 51st Berlin International Film Festival, where Kumai won the Berlinale Camera award for his work on the film.

== Plot ==
In early summer of 1995, in Matsumoto, Nagano, Emi and Hiro, members of their high school's AV club, are producing a documentary. They are examining a series of false accusations that were reported in the wake of the previous year's sarin gas attacks. After receiving no cooperation from most of their local television stations, they manage to locate one that is willing to talk with them. At the station, news director Sasano and his subordinates, reporters Hanazawa, Asakawa and Noda, answer their questions. They reminisce about their coverage of the incident.

On the night of 27 June 1994, a toxic gas attack suddenly occurs in a quiet residential area, resulting in numerous casualties. The following day, the police search the home of middle-aged salaryman Toshio Kanbe, the first person to report the incident, on suspicion of murder. They seize several chemicals in Kanbe's residence. The discovery of potassium cyanide leads them to conclude that Kanbe may have mistakenly mixed the chemicals, causing toxic gas to be released.

Media outlets, eager for a scoop and with information received directly from the police, begin reporting, without verification, that Kanbe is the culprit. Their viewers take the information at face value and persecute the Kanbe family. Meanwhile, Kanbe begins to suffer from hallucinations due to the poisoning. He is further distressed by his wife's condition. She was put into a coma by the gas and has yet to wake up.

Only local news director Sasano refrains from reporting on Kanbe as a suspect, as he has not been able to verify the story. However, he is soon under pressure from his superiors, who want to boost ratings, to report the allegations. Complaints begin pouring in from viewers and the program's sponsors, asking why the station is not covering the case.

Eventually, it is discovered that the toxic gas used in the attack was actually sarin. Doubt begins to form, as Sasano and others realize that sarin cannot be easily created in the home of an ordinary office worker. Amidst this revelation, evidence of the involvement of a cult group begins to surface in the investigation. However, the police higher-ups ignore these tips and continue to push forward with the speculative investigation of Kanbe. They manipulate information to pin the blame on him. Yet on 20 March 1995, the Tokyo subway sarin attack occurs. As it is similar to the Matsumoto attack, public pressure forces the Matsumoto police to refocus their investigation on the cult.

Back in the present, Emi and Hiro become disillusioned after hearing the story. Soon after, a news broadcast announces that the Aum Shinrikyo group has confessed to the Tokyo attack. Following this, Sasano produces a special program about Kanbe. The investigation against Kanbe is dropped, and the program receives a positive response from the public.

== Cast ==
- Kiichi Nakai as Makoto Sasano
- Akira Terao as Toshio Kanbe
- Naomi Hosokawa as Keiko Hanazawa
- Nagiko Tono as Emi Shimao
- Yukiya Kitamura as Koji Asakawa
- Takayuki Kato as Taro Noda
- Renji Ishibashi as Detective Yoshida
- Kazuo Kitamura as Takeo Nagata

== Background ==
On the night of 27 June 1994, the Aum Shinrikyo doomsday cult perpetrated a sarin gas attack in Matsumoto. Eight people were killed and more than 500 were injured in the attack. The sarin aerosol was released from a converted refrigerator truck in the Kaichi Heights area. Aum Shinrikyo had two goals in its attack; to assassinate three judges who were expected to rule against the cult in a lawsuit, and to test out the efficacy of sarin gas as a weapon of mass murder.

After the attack, police focused their investigation on Yoshiyuki Kōno, whose wife was put into a coma by the gas. It was discovered that Kōno had stored a large amount of pesticides in his residence. Although it was later proven that sarin cannot be manufactured from pesticides, Keiichi Tsuneishi, a Japanese historian, claimed the nerve agent was synthesizable from organophosphorus pesticides, and Kōno was dubbed by some in the media as "the Poison Gas Man". He subsequently received hate mail, death threats, and intense legal pressure.

Several months later, on 20 March 1995, a sarin gas attack was carried out on the Tokyo Metro by members of Aum Shinrikyo. Fourteen people were killed, while nearly 1,000 were injured. After the Tokyo attack, blame for the Matsumoto incident was shifted to Aum. Matsumoto's police chief, on behalf of the police department and media, publicly apologized to Kōno.

Kōno's wife later awoke from her coma, but she recovered neither speech nor body movement; she died in 2008.

== Production ==
Director Kumai knew Kōno personally. Kumai, who had experience with crime scenes after his extensive research for The Long Death, believed the accusations against his friend were "absurd". He was also disturbed at the public response to the allegations, and decided to make the film after the Tokyo attack revealed Aum's culpability. The character of Toshio Kanbe is based on Kōno.

== Release ==
Darkness in the Light was theatrically released by Nikkatsu on 24 March 2001, in Japan. The film was released to Region 2 DVD on 22 November 2001.

== Reception ==
In a review for Variety, David Stratton said that Kumai's handling of the real-life material was "stiff and uninteresting," with "any potential for an exciting... story quickly [evaporating]". He believed that international distribution was not likely due to these issues.

Donald Richie, writing for The New York Times, stated that "The director, Kei Kumai, is a man who often chooses real-life miscarriages of justice." He compared the film to Kumai's debut, The Long Death, as well as his later films Sandakan No. 8 and The Sea and Poison. Richie praised Kumai's willingness to take flack for his films about controversial subjects. Nonetheless, he wrote that "Kumai is no Kurosawa", describing him as a "didactic" storyteller who preferred to simplify the moral complexities of social problems.

Hayley Scanlon, in a 2023 review for Windows on Worlds, said that Kumai's films "often dealt with difficult subjects," and in Darkness in the Light he was "Essentially putting mass media and the police force on trial". She also stated that Kumai shows "the collusion between police and the press that leaves reporters unwilling to rock the boat for fear of losing access." Despite a "slightly dated approach" that "displays little of the intensity or visual flair present in some of Kumai's earlier work", she believed that the film was "a poignant opportunity for reflection on a system in urgent need of repair."

== Awards and nominations ==
9th Shanghai International Film Festival

- Nominated: Golden Goblet for Best Film (Kei Kumai)

11th Japanese Movie Critics Awards

- Won: Best Picture
- Won: Newcomer Award (Nagiko Tono)
- Won: Special Award (Masaya Nakamura)

51st Berlin International Film Festival

- Won: Berlinale Camera (Kei Kumai)

56th Mainichi Film Awards

- Won: Excellence Film (shared with Waterboys, Go, Battle Royale and Firefly)
