= Yukiya =

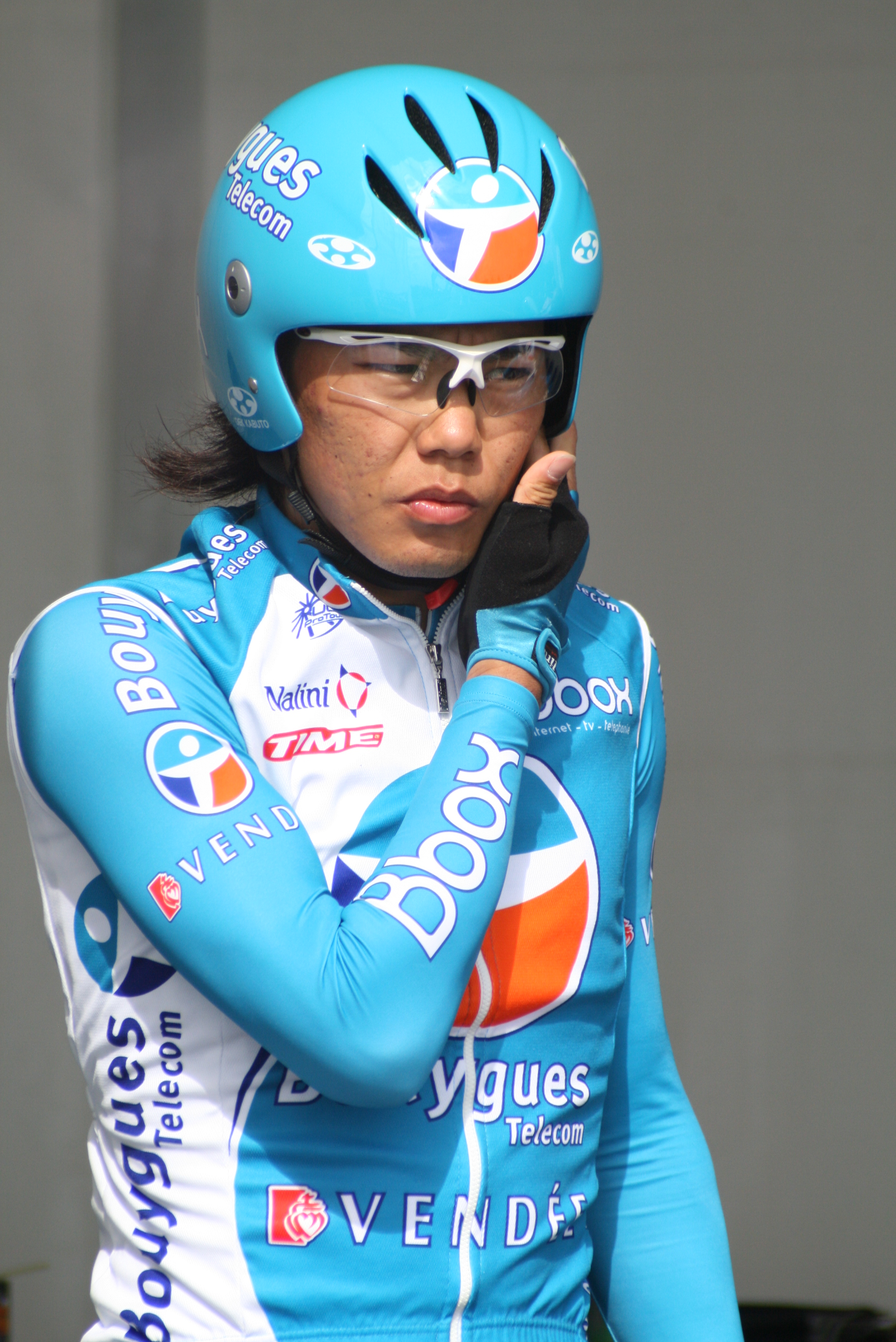
- Yukiya Arashiro, Japanese road bicycle racer
- Pronunciation: jɯkʲija (IPA)
- Gender: Male

Origin
- Origin: Japanese
- Meaning: Different meanings depending on the kanji used

Yukiya is a masculine Japanese given name.

== Written forms ==
Yukiya can be written using different combinations of kanji characters. Here are some examples:

- 幸矢, "happiness, arrow"
- 幸也, "happiness, to be"
- 幸椰, "happiness, coconut tree"
- 幸弥, "happiness, increasingly"
- 幸哉, "happiness, how (interrogative particle)"
- 行矢, "to go, arrow"
- 行也, "to go, to be"
- 行哉, "to go, how (interrogative particle)"
- 行弥, "to go, increasingly"
- 之矢, "of, arrow"
- 之弥, "of, increasingly"
- 志也, "determination, to be"
- 恭也, "respectful, to be"
- 雪矢, "snow, arrow"
- 有起哉, "to have, to rise, how (interrogative particle)"

The name can also be written in hiragana ゆきや or katakana ユキヤ.

== Notable people with the name ==
- Yukiya Amano (天野 之弥; born 1947), Japanese diplomat
- Yukiya Arashiro (新城 幸也; born 1984), Japanese cyclist
- Yukiya Isaniwa (伊佐庭 如矢; 1828–1907), Japanese mayor
- Yukiya Kitamura (北村 有起哉; born 1974), Japanese actor
- Yukiya Saito (齋藤 友貴哉; born 1995), Japanese baseball player
- Yukiya Satō (佐藤 幸椰; born 1995), Japanese ski jumper
- Yukiya Sugita (杉田 祐希也; born 1993), Japanese footballer
- Yukiya Tamashiro (玉城 幸弥; born 1993), Japanese footballer
- Yukiya Uda (宇田 幸矢; born 2001), Japanese table tennis player

== Fictional characters ==
- Yukiya Asagi, the main protagonist of I Want to End This Love Game
