= To Love (1997 film) =

- Film poster
- Directed by: Kei Kumai
- Screenplay by: Kei Kumai
- Based on: Watashi ga Suteta Onna by Shūsaku Endō
- Produced by: Tomozo Yamaguchi
- Starring: Miki Sakai; Atsuro Watabe; Joe Shishido; Chieko Matsubara; Miki Sanjō
- Cinematography: Masao Tochizawa
- Edited by: Osamu Inoue
- Music by: Teizo Matsumura
- Production company: Nikkatsu
- Distributed by: Nikkatsu
- Release date: 4 October 1997 (Japan)
- Running time: 114 minutes
- Country: Japan
- Language: Japanese

To Love (Japanese: 愛する, Hepburn: Aisuru) is a 1997 Japanese drama film written and directed by Kei Kumai. It is based on the novel Watashi ga Suteta Onna by Shūsaku Endō, making it Kumai's third and final adaptation of an Endō novel (Endō's novel had previously been adapted into the 1969 Kirio Urayama film The Girl I Abandoned).

The film stars Miki Sakai as Mitsu Morita, a woman diagnosed with leprosy who struggles against discrimination, in addition to Atsuro Watabe, Joe Shishido, Chieko Matsubara and Miki Sanjō in supporting roles. The film's score was composed by Teizo Matsumura, while its theme song is "Legend" (伝説, "Densetsu") by Miyuki Nakajima (which was taken from her album Paradise Cafe). To Love was theatrically released by Nikkatsu on 4 October 1997, in Japan.

== Plot ==
Mitsu, a lonely girl working and living at a cotton factory, meets Tsutomu, a young man in a similar situation, and falls in love with him. However, to Tsutomu, she is nothing more than a woman he has just met. He also comes from a broken home and is frightened by love. After seducing her and having sex, he disappears from Mitsu's life.

A month later, the factory has closed down. Mitsu is now working at a seedy bar. One day she coincidentally reunites with Tsutomu. Without scolding him for cutting off contact, Mitsu tries her best to love him. Seeing her in a new light, Tsutomu begins to open his heart to her. The two lovers move in together. However, their happiness is short-lived, as Mitsu falls ill, and Tsutomu notices a sore on her arm. On the recommendation of a university hospital, she is admitted to a sanatorium in the countryside.

Separating from Tsutomu, Mitsu enters Shin'ai-en Hospital at the foot of the Northern Japanese Alps alone. There, she is diagnosed with leprosy. In previous decades, the government took measures to forcibly isolate those who suffered from the disease. However, Mitsu is told that modern medicine can cure it, and she is relieved.

Mitsu meets the fellow patients at the sanatorium. Everyone is kind to her, and she becomes particularly close with her roommate, an elderly woman named Taeko Kano. Taeko tells Mitsu stories of societal persecution that the other leprosy patients had suffered. Due to this discrimination, even though Taeko herself recovers from the disease, she can only live within the sanatorium.

One day, Mitsu learns from Director Okuhara that she was misdiagnosed. Trembling with joy, Mitsu is discharged. But at the train station, she cannot bring herself to board the train back to Tokyo. Thinking of the patients who had been kind to her, she decides to return to the sanatorium and work there, defying the objections of the head nurse and others.

In January, Tsutomu, who had sent Mitsu a New Year's card, receives a letter from Taeko. She informs him of Mitsu's life in the sanatorium and her death in a traffic accident. Upon receiving the news, Tsutomu visits Mitsu's grave.

== Cast ==
- Miki Sakai as Mitsu Morita
- Atsuro Watabe as Tsutomu Yoshioka
- Joe Shishido as Chinen
- Chieko Matsubara as Yamagata
- Miki Sanjō as Inamura
- Tsunehiko Kamijō as Okuhara
- Ken Nishida as Nishiyama
- Kyōko Kishida as Taeko Kano
- Keiju Kobayashi as Old Mr. Kamijo
- Moeko Ezawa as Woman at the apartment
- Masumi Okada as Professor

== Background ==
Endō's original novel, Watashi ga Suteta Onna (lit. The Girl I Abandoned), was first published in 1964. It was first adapted by Kirio Urayama into a 1969 film of the same name.

== Production ==
Kumai's production was launched to commemorate Nikkatsu having survived bankruptcy proceedings. Former Nikkatsu stars Joe Shishido, Chieko Matsubara and Keiju Kobayashi were cast as part of this commemoration initiative. Lead actress Miki Sakai, a former J-pop idol singer, had made her feature film debut two years prior in Shunji Iwai's Love Letter. Though the novel was set in the 1950s, Kumai adapted the story into a contemporary setting. Endō died while the script was still being written. Filming commenced in November 1996.

== Release ==
To Love was theatrically released by Nikkatsu on 4 October 1997, in Japan. The film was released to Region 2 DVD on 14 December 2007.

== Reception ==
In a review for Variety, Dennis Harvey called To Love a "Plodding, earnest weepy" that seemed like it was made "for... another era". He believed that Sakai gave a stereotypical performance, and criticized the relationship between her and Watabe's character. He also said that Kumai was "hapless to render [the film's twist] effective", and that the film lacked "energy or conviction", with its story becoming "more and more lachrymose as it goes along, to embarrassing effect."

Aaron Gerow, writing for The Daily Yomiuri, said that the film was tastefully assembled, but criticized Sakai's performance and the sermonizing of Kumai's script. He concluded, "Setting lofty goals of spirituality and high art, To Love never escapes the shallowness of its lead actress, despite all the skill and tradition that went into it."

== Awards and nominations ==
10th Nikkan Sports Film Awards

- Won: Best Film
- Won: Best Newcomer (Miki Sakai, also won for Yukai and The Seven Chefs)

20th Montreal World Film Festival

- Nominated: Grand Prix des Amériques (Kei Kumai)
