= Ken Nishida =

Japanese actor and voice actor (born 1945)

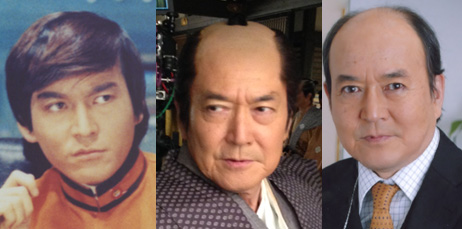
- Born: June 24, 1945 (age 80); Wonsan, Kōgen Province, Korea, Empire of Japan
- Occupation: Actor

Ken Nishida (西田 健, Nishida Ken; born June 24, 1945) is a Japanese actor and voice actor. He is noted for his roles in Return of Ultraman, Eyeful Daisakusen, Uchuu Keiji Gavan, Ninpu Sentai Hurricanger, G-Men '75, and Shin Kyoto Meikyū Annai. His guest roles have included multiple episodes of Key Hunter, Mito Kōmon, Taiyō ni Hoero!, Zenigata Heiji, and Abarenbō Shōgun. He is also a regular guest star in the two-hour prime-time special drama format, with 35 appearances on the Tuesday Kayō Suspense Gekijō and 25 on the Saturday Doyō Wide Gekijō. A veteran jidaigeki actor, Nishida portrayed the recurring villain Mugensai who masterminded the plot to assassinate the shogun in the series Shogun Iemitsu Shinobi Tabi Part II. He appeared as Asano Daigaku, younger brother of the daimyō whose forced seppuku triggered the events of the Forty-seven rōnin, in The Fall of Ako Castle. A modern role was in the 1986 Kei Kumai film adaptation Umi to Doku of the Shūsaku Endō novel of the same name (translated as The Sea and Poison). Three films in the Gokudō no Onna-tachi series of gangster films are also to his credit. In anime, Ken provided the Japanese voice of Kazundo Gouda in Ghost in the Shell: S.A.C. 2nd GIG.

== Personality ==
- He has been a car lover since he was young, and has taken over famous German cars and British sports cars, and his current favorite car is Porsche 911 Carrera 4.
