= Tsunehiko Kamijō =

Japanese singer, actor and voice actor (1940–2025)

- Born: March 7, 1940; Nagano, Japan
- Died: July 22, 2025 (aged 85); Nagano, Japan
- Occupations: Singer, actor, voice actor
- Years active: 1962–2025
- Spouse: Etsuko Kamijō (1983–2025)

Tsunehiko Kamijō (上條 恒彦, Kamijō Tsunehiko; March 7, 1940 – July 22, 2025) was a Japanese singer, actor and voice actor.

Kamijō died on July 22, 2025, at the age of 85.

== Filmography ==
=== Live-action films ===
- Tora-san's Lullaby (1974) – Yatarō Ōkawa
- Tora-san's Rise and Fall (1975) – A pirate
- Death of a Tea Master (1989) – Yamanoue Sōji
- To Love (1997) – Okuhara
- The Mourner (2015)

=== Anime films ===
- Porco Rosso (1992) – Mamma Aiuto Gang Boss
- Princess Mononoke (1997) – Gonza
- Doraemon: Nobita's Great Adventure in the South Seas (1998) – Mr. Cash
- Spirited Away (2001) – Chichiyaku

=== Television dramas ===
- Taiga drama series
  - Tokugawa Ieyasu (1983) – Torii Suneemon
  - Takeda Shingen (1988) – Murakami Yoshikiyo
  - Hideyoshi (1996) – Saitō Toshimitsu
  - Aoi Tokugawa Sandai (2000) – Uesugi Kagekatsu
  - Gunshi Kanbei (2014) – Ōtomo Sōrin
- Kinpachi-sensei (1979–2011) – Hajime Hattori
- GeGeGe no Nyōbō (2010) – Otomatsu Sugiura
- Team Medical Dragon 4 (2014) – Nobuo Morimoto
- Trick Shinsaku Special 3 (2014) – Kōzō Saeki

=== Tokusatsu ===
- Space Sheriff Sharivan (1983–84) – Denichirō Iga
- Daimajin Kanon (2010) – Bujin-sama (voice)

=== Stage ===
- Man of La Mancha (1977–2005) – The Innkeeper
- Fiddler on the Roof (1982–2005) – Lazar Wolf
- My Fair Lady (1993–2007) – Alfred P. Doolittle
- Twelfth Night (2003) – Malvolio
- Cabaret (2004) – Herr Schultz
- The Woman in White (2007) – Count Fosco
- Zorro (2011) – Don Alejandro de la Vega

=== Dubbing ===
- The Little Mermaid – Sebastian
- The Front Page – Walter Burns (Walter Matthau)
- Go Go Gophers – Colonel Kit Coyote, Narrator (Kenny Delmar)

== Discography ==
- Ame yo Fure (1969)
- Tabidachi no Uta (1971)
- Dareka ga Kaze no Naka de (1972)
- chanter (1973)
- Sangosho ni nani wo mita (1973)
- Hashi (1973)
- Sayonara no Sekai (1974)

=== Kōhaku Uta Gassen appearances ===
Year	Song	Opposite
1972	Tabidachi no Uta	Ouyang Fei Fei
1973	chanter	The Peanuts

== Awards and prizes ==
Year	Award	Work	Result
1971	2nd World Popular Song Festival	Tabidachi No Uta	Won
1999	25th Kikuta Kazuo Theater Prize for Theater grand-prix	Man of La Mancha	Nominated
