= Tsunehiko =

- Pronunciation: tsɯneçiko (IPA)
- Gender: Male

Origin
- Origin: Japanese
- Meaning: Different meanings depending on the kanji used

Other names
- Alternative spelling: Tunehiko (Kunrei-shiki) Tunehiko (Nihon-shiki) Tsunehiko (Hepburn)

Tsunehiko is a masculine Japanese given name.

== Written forms ==
Tsunehiko can be written using different combinations of kanji characters. Here are some examples:

- 常彦, "usual, elegant boy"
- 常比古, "usual, young man (archaic)"
- 恒彦, "always, elegant boy"
- 恒比古, "always, young man (archaic)"
- 庸彦, "common, elegant boy"
- 毎彦, "every, elegant boy"

The name can also be written in hiragana つねひこ or katakana ツネヒコ.

== Notable people with the name ==
- Tsunehiko Kamijō (上條 恒彦; born 1940), Japanese singer
- Tsunehiko Watase (渡瀬 恒彦; 1944–2017), Japanese actor
