= Deep River (film) =

- Film poster
- Directed by: Kei Kumai
- Screenplay by: Kei Kumai
- Based on: Deep River by Shūsaku Endō
- Produced by: Masayuki Sato
- Starring: Kumiko Akiyoshi; Eiji Okuda; Hisashi Igawa; Kyōko Kagawa; Toshiro Mifune
- Cinematography: Masao Tochizawa
- Edited by: Osamu Inoue
- Music by: Teizo Matsumura
- Production companies: Deep River Production Committee; Shigoto
- Distributed by: Toho
- Release date: 24 June 1995 (Japan)
- Running time: 130 minutes
- Country: Japan
- Language: Japanese

Deep River (Japanese: 深い河, Hepburn: Fukai kawa) is a 1995 Japanese drama film directed by Kei Kumai. It is based on the novel of the same name by Shūsaku Endō. The film was chosen as Japan's official submission to the 68th Academy Awards for Best Foreign Language Film, but did not manage to receive a nomination. It also marked the final film appearance of legendary Japanese actor Toshiro Mifune before his death in 1997.

The film has yet to see an NTSC home media release, or even one with an English translation.

== Cast ==
- Kumiko Akiyoshi as Mitsuko
- Eiji Okuda as Otsu
- Hisashi Igawa as Isobe
- Kyōko Kagawa as Isobe's wife
- Toshiro Mifune as Tsukada
- Kin Sugai as Tsukada's wife
- Yoichi Numata as Kiguchi
- Tetta Sugimoto as Enam
- Hiroyuki Okita as Sanjyo
- Maki Shirai as Sanjyo's wife

== See also ==
- List of submissions to the 68th Academy Awards for Best Foreign Language Film
- List of Japanese submissions for the Academy Award for Best Foreign Language Film
