= Naomi Hosokawa =

Japanese actress and singer

Naomi Hosokawa (細川直美 Hosokawa Naomi; real name: Chiho Katsurayama (葛山知保 Katsurayama Chiho; born 18 June 1974 in Yokohama, Kanagawa Prefecture, Japan) is a Japanese actress and singer.

== Filmography ==
=== Films ===
- Shigure no Ki (1998) – Yūko Furuya
- Darkness in the Light (2001) – Keiko Hanazawa
- The Setting Sun (2022)

=== Television ===
- Karin (1993–94)
- Heaven's Coin (1995) – Shōko Yūki
- Hideyoshi (1996) – Sato

Preceded by Miki Fujitani	Japan Bishojo Contest; 1988	Succeeded by Mitsuyo Obara
