= Return of Ultraman =

Japanese Television series

- Title logo

Japanese name
- Kanji: 帰ってきたウルトラマン
Transcriptions
- Revised Hepburn: Kaettekita Urutoraman
- Genre: Tokusatsu; Kaiju; Superhero; Science fiction
- Developed by: Shozo Uehara; Yoji Hashimoto
- Starring: Jiro Dan; Nobuo Tsukamoto; Jun Negami; Shunsuke Ikeda; Ken Nishida; Ko Matsui; Mika Katsuragi; Shin Kishida; Rumi Sakakibara; Hideki Kawaguchi
- Narrated by: Akira Nagoya
- Music by: Tōru Fuyuki
- Country of origin: Japan
- Original language: Japanese
- No. of episodes: 51

Production
- Producers: Hajime Tsuburaya; Susumu Saito (TBS); Yoji Hashimoto (TBS)
- Running time: 24 mins
- Production companies: Tsuburaya Productions; TBS

Original release
- Network: JNN (TBS)
- Release: April 2, 1971 – March 31, 1972

Related
- Ultraseven; Ultraman Ace

Return of Ultraman (帰ってきたウルトラマン, Kaettekita Urutoraman) is a Japanese tokusatsu science fiction television series produced by Tsuburaya Productions. The third entry (fourth overall) in the Ultra series, the series aired on Tokyo Broadcasting System from April 2, 1971, to March 31, 1972. It became successful enough to inspire a second "Kaiju Boom" in Japan, with rival studios producing their own tokusatsu shows and Tsuburaya Productions producing additional Ultraman shows annually for the next three years. Prior to the series' release, Ultra Q, Ultraman, and Ultraseven were stand-alone titles however, Return of Ultraman is the first installment to unite the first three shows into an interconnected universe.

== Premise ==
This series is a follow-up to the original Ultraman and Ultraseven that is set in 1971, four years after Ultraseven left Earth, and five years after Ultraman came to Earth. The first episode begins with a fight between two giant monsters named Takkong and Zazarn in Tokyo. Amid the monster destruction, young race-car driver Hideki Go is killed while trying to rescue a little boy and a dog from the falling rubble. His valiant sacrifice is noted by everyone, including his friends and the new defense force MAT (Monster Attack Team), but an unseen being also takes notice. Looking over Hideki is "New Ultraman" ("Ultraman Jack"), who is so touched by the race car driver's heroism, that he decides to combine his life force with that of Hideki, thus bringing him back to life (just like the original Ultraman did with Shin Hayata), much to everyone's astonishment. MAT then asks Hideki to join the team, which he does, especially since in this frightening new "Age of Monsters", Earth will need a savior. In times of crisis, Hideki will raise his right arm and, by force of will, transform into Ultraman to fight monsters. In addition, the original Ultraman and Ultraseven are watching New Ultraman's battles from the sidelines, and offer their help when he is in peril.

== Cast ==
Humans:

- Jirō Dan as Hideki Go/Ultraman Jack
- Nobuo Tsukamoto as Katsuichirō Katō
- Jun Negami as Ryū Ibuki
- Shunsuke Ikeda as Takeshi Minami
- Ken Nishida as Fumio Kishida
- Kō Mitsui as Ippei Ueno
- Mika Katsuragi as Yuriko Oka
- Shin Kishida as Ken Sakata
- Rumi Sakakibara as Aki Sakata
- Hideki Kawaguchi as Jirō Sakata
- Kazuko Iwasaki as Rumiko Murano
- Susumu Fujita as Chief Kishida
- Kenji Sahara as Staff Officer Satake

Voice performers:

- Isao Yatsu as Ultraman Jack, (Note: Yatsu provided the voice for Ultraman Jack on episodes: 1, 18, 30, 31, 37, while Murakoshi provided the voice for episode 50.) Ultraman, Alien Varduck, Alien Messie, Alien Zoole, Sasahiler
- Ichirō Murakoshi as Ultraman Jack and Ultraseven
- Tetsuya Kaji as Alien Zelan and Draculas
- Ritsuo Sawa as Alien Nackle
- Osamu Saka as Alien Baltan Jr., Alien Stora, and Alien Bat
- Osamu Ichikawa as Yametaranse

== Production ==
Eiji Tsuburaya had intended Ultraseven to be the conclusion to the Ultra series. However, due to increased merchandise sales from the first three shows and demand by fans for a new show, Tsuburaya decided to develop the fourth Ultra series. Tsuburaya conceived the show's title and the idea was for the show to be a direct sequel to the 1966 series, with Hayata and passing the Beta Capsule over to a new human host. The idea was submitted to Tokyo Broadcasting System (TBS) in April 1969. However, TBS and its sponsors requested that the new series be centered on a brand new Ultraman, separate from the 1966 character, for marketing and merchandise purposes.

After Tsuburaya's death, his eldest son Hajime was named president of Tsuburaya Productions and assembled a team to revise Return of Ultraman. The first three shows were rebroadcast to temporarily appease fan demands. Shozo Uehara and TBS producer Yoji Hashimoto conceived the final concept of the series. Revisions were made to the new Ultraman's design, after feedback from licensees, to avoid similarities with the 1966 Ultraman. This included giving the new Ultraman gloves, boots, and pinstripes around the red areas. The new character was referred to as "New Ultraman" by fans and the name was used by Tsuburaya Productions for later appearances. The character was rebranded as "Ultraman Jack" in 1984 after Tsuburaya Productions held a contest for children to submit suggestions.

== Episodes ==
No.	Title	Directed by	Written by	Original release date
1	"All Monsters Attack"; Transliteration: "Kaiju Sō-Shingeki" (Japanese: 怪獣総進撃)	Ishirō Honda	Shozo Uehara	April 2, 1971
2	"Takkong's Great Counterattack"; Transliteration: "Takkongu Dai-Gyakushū" (Japanese: タッコング大逆襲)	Ishirō Honda	Shozo Uehara	April 9, 1971
3	"The Monster Realm of Terror"; Transliteration: "Kyoufu No Kaijū Makyou" (Japanese: 恐怖の怪獣魔境)	Masanori Kakei	Shozo Uehara	April 16, 1971
4	"Fatal Attack! Meteor Kick"; Transliteration: "Hissatsu! Ryuusei Kikku" (Japanese: 必殺! 流星キック)	Masanori Kakei	Shozo Uehara	April 23, 1971
5	"Two Giant Monsters Attack Tokyo"; Transliteration: "Nidai Kaijū Tōkyō o Shūgeki" (Japanese: 二大怪獣東京を襲撃)	Yoshiharu Tomita	Shozo Uehara	April 30, 1971
6	"Showdown! Monsters vs. MAT"; Transliteration: "Kessen! Kaijū Tai Matto" (Japanese: 決戦! 怪獣対マット)	Yoshiharu Tomita	Shozo Uehara	May 7, 1971
7	"Operation Monster Rainbow"; Transliteration: "Kaijū Reinbō Sakusen" (Japanese: 怪獣レインボー作戦)	Ishirō Honda	Shozo Uehara	May 14, 1971
8	"Monster Time Bomb"; Transliteration: "Kaijū Jigen Bakudan" (Japanese: 怪獣時限爆弾)	Masanori Kakei	Shigemitsu Taguchi	May 21, 1971
9	"Monster Island S.O.S."; Transliteration: "Kaijū-jima Esu Ō Esu" (Japanese: 怪獣島SOS)	Ishirō Honda	Masaru Igami	May 28, 1971
10	"Dinosaur Detonation Order"; Transliteration: "Kyōryū Bakuha Shirei" (Japanese: 恐竜爆破指令)	Masanori Kakei	Shozo Uehara	June 4, 1971
11	"Poison Gas Monster Appears"; Transliteration: "Dokugasu Kaijū Shutsugen" (Japanese: 毒ガス怪獣出現)	Noboru Kaji	Tetsuo Kinjo	June 11, 1971
12	"Revenge of Monster Shugaron"; Transliteration: "Kaijū Shugaron no Fukushū" (Japanese: 怪獣シュガロンの復讐)	Noboru Kaji	Shozo Uehara	June 18, 1971
13	"Terror of the Tsunami Monster, Tokyo in Peril"; Transliteration: "Tsunami Kaijū no Kyōfu Tōkyō Dai Pinchi" (Japanese: 津波怪獣の恐怖 東京大ピンチ)	Yoshiharu Tomita	Shozo Uehara	June 25, 1971
14	"Terror of the Two Giant Monsters, The Great Tokyo Tornado"; Transliteration: "Ni Dai Kaijū no Kyōfu, Tōkyō Ōtatsu Maki Fukushū" (Japanese: 二大怪獣の恐怖 東京大龍巻)	Yoshiharu Tomita	Shozo Uehara	July 2, 1971
15	"Revenge of the Monster Boy"; Transliteration: "Kaijū Shōnen no Fukushū" (Japanese: 怪獣少年の復讐)	Eizo Yamagiwa	Shigemitsu Taguchi	July 9, 1971
16	"The Mystery of Big Bird Monster Terochilus"; Transliteration: "Dai Kaichō Terochirusu no Nazo" (Japanese: 大怪鳥テロチルスの謎)	Eizo Yamagiwa	Shozo Uehara	July 16, 1971
17	"Monster Bird Terochilus, Big Air Raid of Tokyo"; Transliteration: "Kaichō Terochirusu Tōkyō Dai Kūbaku" (Japanese: 怪鳥テロチルス東京大空爆)	Eizo Yamagiwa	Shozo Uehara	July 23, 1971
18	"Here Comes Ultraseven!"; Transliteration: "Urutorasebun Sanjō!" (Japanese: ウルトラセブン参上)	Yoshiharu Tomita	Shinichi Ichikawa	August 6, 1971
19	"The Invisible Giant Monster from Outer Space"; Transliteration: "Uchū kara kita Tōmei Dai-kaijū" (Japanese: 宇宙から来た透明大怪獣)	Noboru Kaji	Shozo Uehara	August 13, 1971
20	"The Monster is a Shooting Star in Space"; Transliteration: "Kaijū wa uchū no nagareboshi" (Japanese: 怪獣は宇宙の流れ星)	Masanori Kakei	Toshiro Ishido	August 20, 1971
21	"The Monster Channel"; Transliteration: "Kaiju Channeru" (Japanese: 怪獣チャンネル)	Masanori Kakei	Shinichi Ichikawa	August 27, 1971
22	"Leave This Monster to Me"; Transliteration: "Kono kaijū wa ore ga yaru" (Japanese: この怪獣は俺が殺る)	Eizo Yamagiwa	Shinichi Ichikawa	September 3, 1971
23	"Spit Out the Stars, Dark Monster!"; Transliteration: "Ankoū Kaijū Hoshi wo Hakidake!" (Japanese: 鮟鱇怪獣 星を吐き出け!)	Eizo Yamagiwa	Toshiro Ishido	September 10, 1971
24	"Horror! Birth of the Apartment Monster"; Transliteration: "Senritsu Manshiyon Kaijū Tanjō" (Japanese: 戦慄! マンシヨン怪獣誕生)	Yoshiharu Tomita	Shozo Uehara	September 17, 1971
25	"Leaving My Home Planet, Earth"; Transliteration: "Furusato Chikyū o saru" (Japanese: ふるさと地球を去る)	Yoshiharu Tomita	Shinichi Ichikawa	September 24, 1971
26	"Mystery! Homicide Beetle Incident"; Transliteration: "Kikai! Satsujin Kabutomushi jiken" (Japanese: 奇怪！殺人甲虫事件)	Masanori Kakei	Shozo Uehara	October 1, 1971
27	"Go to Hell With This Blow!"; Transliteration: "Kono ippatsu de Jigoku e Ike!" (Japanese: この一発で地獄へ行け！)	Masanori Kakei	Shinichi Ichikawa	October 8, 1971
28	"Operation Ultra Special Attack"; Transliteration: "Urutora Tokkōdai Sakusen" (Japanese: ウルトラ特攻大作戦)	Eizo Yamagiwa	Akio Jissoji	October 15, 1971
29	"Jiro Rides a Monster"; Transliteration: "Jirō-kun Kaijū ni noru" (Japanese: 次郎くん怪獣に乗る)	Eizo Yamagiwa	Shigemitsu Taguchi	October 22, 1971
30	"The Cursed Bone God Oxter"; Transliteration: "Noroi no Hone-shin Okusutā" (Japanese: 呪いの骨神オクスター)	Tadashi Mafune	Toshiro Ishido	October 29, 1971
31	"In Between Devil and Angel..."; Transliteration: "Akuma to Tenshi no ma ni" (Japanese: 悪魔と天使の間に)	Tadashi Mafune	Shinichi Ichikawa	November 5, 1971
32	"Duel Under the Setting Sun"; Transliteration: "Rakujitsu no Kettō" (Japanese: 落日の決闘)	Jun Oki	Kitao Senzoku	November 12, 1971
33	"The Monster Tamer and the Boy"; Transliteration: "Kaijū-Tsukai to Shōnen" (Japanese: 怪獣使いと少年)	Shohei Tojo	Shozo Uehara	November 19, 1971
34	"An Unforgiven Life"; Transliteration: "Yurusarezaru Inochi" (Japanese: 許されざるいのち)	Eizo Yamagiwa	Toshiro Ishido & Shinichiro Kobayashi	November 26, 1971
35	"Cruel! Light Monster Prizuma"; Transliteration: "Zankoku! Hikari Kaijū Purizu Ma" (Japanese: 残酷! 光怪獣プリズ魔)	Eizo Yamagiwa	Shin Akekawa	December 3, 1971
36	"Banish the Night"; Transliteration: "Yoru wo ke-chirase" (Japanese: 夜を蹴散らせ)	Masanori Kakei	Toshiro Ishido	December 10, 1971
37	"Ultraman Dies at Sunset"; Transliteration: "Urutoraman Yūhi ni Shisu" (Japanese: ウルトラマン夕陽に死す)	Yoshiharu Tomita	Shozo Uehara	December 17, 1971
38	"When the Star of Ultra Shines"; Transliteration: "Urutora no hoshi Hikaru Toki" (Japanese: ウルトラの星光る時)	Yoshiharu Tomita	Shozo Uehara	December 24, 1971
39	"Winter Horror Series: 20th Century Abominable Snowman"; Transliteration: "Fuyu no Kaiki Shirīzu - Nijū-Seiki no Yuki Otoko" (Japanese: 冬の怪奇シリーズ・20世紀の雪男)	Masanori Kakei	Shigemitsu Taguchi	January 7, 1972
40	"Winter Horror Series: The Phantom Snow Woman"; Transliteration: "Fuyu no Kaiki Shirīzu - Maboroshi no Yuki Onna" (Japanese: 冬の怪奇シリーズ・まぼろしの雪女)	Masanori Kakei	Toshiro Ishido	January 14, 1972
41	"The Revenge of Alien Baltan Jr."; Transliteration: "Barutan Seijin Juniā no Fukushu" (Japanese: バルタン星人Jr.の復習)	Takaharu Saeki	Shukei Nagasaka	January 21, 1972
42	"The Monster that Stands on Mt. Fuji"; Transliteration: "Fuji ni Tatsu Kaijū" (Japanese: 富士に立つ怪獣)	Takaharu Saeki	Toshiro Ishido	January 28, 1972
43	"The Demon God Howls at the Moon"; Transliteration: "Majin Tsuki ni hoeru" (Japanese: 魔神月に咆える)	Masanori Kakei	Toshiro Ishido	February 4, 1972
44	"To the Starry Sky with Love"; Transliteration: "Hoshizora ni Ai wo komete" (Japanese: 星空に愛をこめて)	Masanori Kakei	Shigemitsu Taguchi	February 11, 1972
45	"Assassinate Hideki Go!"; Transliteration: "Gō Hideki wo Ansantsu seyo!" (Japanese: 郷秀樹を暗殺せよ!)	Noboru Kaji	Masao Saito	February 18, 1972
46	"Fill This Blow with Anger"; Transliteration: "Kono ichigeki ni ikari o komete" (Japanese: この一撃に怒りをこめて)	Noboru Kaji	Shigemitsu Taguchi	February 25, 1972
47	"The Marked Woman"; Transliteration: "Newarata onna" (Japanese: 狙わらた女)	Takaharu Saeki	Toshiro Ishido	March 3, 1972
48	"We'll Take Earth!"; Transliteration: "Chikyū Itadakimasu" (Japanese: 地球頂きます)	Takaharu Saeki	Mieko Osanai	March 10, 1972
49	"MAT is the Name of Space Warriors"; Transliteration: "Uchuu Senshi Sono Nama Matto" (Japanese: 宇宙戦士その名まMAT)	Shūe Matsubayashi	Masaru Igami	March 17, 1972
50	"Invitation from Hell"; Transliteration: "Jigoku Kara no Sasoi" (Japanese: 地獄からの誘い)	Shūe Matsubayashi	Masao Saito	March 24, 1972
51	"The Five Oaths of Ultra"; Transliteration: "Urutora Itsutsu no Chikai" (Japanese: ウルトラ5つの誓い)	Ishirō Honda	Shozo Uehara	March 31, 1972

== Post-release ==
=== Manga ===
A manga series by Akira Mizuho ran in Bessatsu Shōnen Sunday from May to December 1971.

== Home media ==
In November 2015, Tsuburaya Productions and Bandai Visual released the series on Blu-ray in Japan. In July 2019, Mill Creek Entertainment announced that it had acquired most of the Ultraman library from Tsuburaya Productions through Indigo Entertainment, including 1,100 TV episodes and 20 films. Mill Creek released the series on Blu-ray and digital in North America on February 25, 2020, in standard and steelbook sets.

In July 2020, Shout! Factory announced to have struck a multi-year deal with Alliance Entertainment and Mill Creek, with the blessings of Tsuburaya and Indigo, that granted them the exclusive SVOD and AVOD digital rights to the Ultra series and films (1,100 TV episodes and 20 films) acquired by Mill Creek the previous year. Return of Ultraman, amongst other titles, will stream in the United States and Canada through Shout! Factory TV and Tokushoutsu.
