= Shikibu Monogatari =

- Film poster
- Directed by: Kei Kumai
- Screenplay by: Kei Kumai
- Based on: Kasabuta Shikibu kō by Akimoto Matsuyo
- Produced by: Kazunobu Yamaguchi
- Starring: Eiji Okuda; Mieko Harada; Kyōko Kagawa; Keiko Kishi; Akemi Negishi
- Cinematography: Masao Tochizawa
- Edited by: Osamu Inoue
- Music by: Teizo Matsumura
- Production company: Seiyu
- Distributed by: Toho
- Release date: October 6, 1990 (Japan)
- Running time: 113 minutes
- Country: Japan
- Language: Japanese
- Box office: ¥350 million

Shikibu Monogatari (Japanese: 式部物語; lit. The Story of Shikibu), also known as Mt. Aso's Passions, is a 1990 Japanese drama film directed by Kei Kumai. Its screenplay was adapted by Kumai from a play by Akimoto Matsuyo. The film stars Eiji Okuda as Toyoichi Otomo, a mentally damaged man who falls in with a religious cult. It co-stars Mieko Harada, Kyōko Kagawa, Keiko Kishi and Akemi Negishi in supporting roles. The film's score was composed by Teizo Matsumura. Shikibu Monogatari premiered at the Montreal World Film Festival, where it won the award for Best Artistic Contribution, before being theatrically released by Toho on October 6, 1990, in Japan.

== Premise ==
Toyoichi Otomo is a factory worker living at the foot of Mount Aso in rural Kyushu. One day, he is caught in a horrific industrial accident. The factory floods with carbon monoxide, resulting in an explosion. Though Toyoichi survives, he is left out of work and with severe mental health issues. His elderly mother, Isa, and wife, Terue, support him, but his wife is having an affair, and a rift grows between them.

One day, a religious group on pilgrimage, calling themselves the Izumi Church, visit Toyoichi's village. Toyoichi is instantly captivated by their mysterious leader, the Buddhist priestess Chishu, who claims to be the 68th reincarnated descendant of the ancient poet Izumi Shikibu. In the 11th century, Shikibu was believed to have received salvation from Yakushi Nyorai for her faith. She travelled Japan, proselytizing her religion and supposedly curing the sick and infirm by taking on their illnesses herself. The Izumi Church believes that Shikibu is regularly reincarnated with her healing powers intact; consequently, Chishu's sect regards her as a living saint. Toyoichi finds solace in Chishu's church. As they prepare to leave the village and continue their pilgrimage in search of salvation, Isa, defying Terue's objections, joins Toyoichi in the hopes that she can convince him to come back home.

On their journey, Chishu manipulates the fragile Toyoichi by playing a sexual cat-and-mouse game with him. Soon, Toyoichi falls in love and has sex with her. Yumenosuke, a member of the church who is jealous of their relationship, beats Toyoichi and throws him into a ravine. Toyoichi survives, with the shock bringing him back to his senses. He begins to think of leaving the church. Isa rejoices and informs Terue of the good news. However, Toyoichi loses his sanity once again when Chishu, aware of the divisive impact of their relationship and the increasingly fractious nature of the church, coldly rejects him.

Isa returns to the village temple, heartbroken by Toyoichi's condition. In her despair, Isa urges Terue to bring Toyoichi home and rebuild their family. As Terue leaves to rescue Toyoichi, Isa stays at the village temple, determined to pray for salvation and bear the burden of her son's misfortunes all by herself.

== Cast ==
- Eiji Okuda as Toyoichi Otomo
- Mieko Harada as Terue Otomo
- Kyōko Kagawa as Isa Otomo
- Keiko Kishi as Priestess Chishu
- Akemi Negishi as Fuji
- Tetta Sugimoto as Yumenosuke
- Rika Abiko as Uchiko
- Taiko Shinbashi as Ume
- Akio Yokoyama as Mantaro
- Satoko Iwasaki

== Background ==
Akimoto Matsuyo originally devised Shikibu Monogatari as a screenplay for a television film named Umi yori fukaki: Kasabuta Shikibu kō, which debuted on November 21, 1965 on TBS. Matsuyo later adapted her own story into a play, first published under the name Kasabuta Shikibu kō in 1969 by Kawade Shobō Shinsha; the play was republished in 1976 by the same company. In 1970, Matsuyo won the Mainichi Arts Award for her work on the play. It was performed throughout the 1960s and 1970s (originally by the Haiyuza Theatre Company), and was most recently revived in 2017 by the Hyōgo Prefecture Piccolo Theater Company.

== Release ==
Shikibu Monogatari was theatrically released by Toho on October 6, 1990, in Japan. The film was released to VHS on August 21, 1991, by Pony Canyon, and was later released to Region 2 DVD on May 25, 2001. It was re-released to DVD on August 25, 2017.

== Reception ==
In a review for Variety, David Stratton wrote that Shikibu Monogatari tackles religious fanaticism with "uneven results." He believed that the film would be "difficult to market outside Asian territories" as the story's background is left unexplained yet "is essential to comprehend the characters' motivations." Of director Kumai, Stratton said that "[he] has always tended to be literal in his approach to his subjects, and that's the case here." He did believe that there were positive elements, writing that the locations were "handsomely used", and that the casting of Keiko Kishi would be intriguing to Japanese film fans. Nonetheless, Stratton concluded that Shikibu Monogatari was "ultimately unsatisfactory."

== Awards and nominations ==
14th Japan Academy Awards

- Won: Outstanding Achievement in Art Direction (Takeo Kimura, also won for Childhood Days and Hong Kong Paradise)
- Nominated: Outstanding Performance by an Actress in a Supporting Role (Kyōko Kagawa)
- Nominated: Outstanding Performance by an Actress in a Supporting Role (Mieko Harada, also nominated for Dreams and Tsuribaka Nisshi 2)
- Nominated: Outstanding Achievement in Music (Teizo Matsumura, also nominated for Ronin Gai)

13th Montreal World Film Festival

- Won: Best Artistic Contribution (Kei Kumai, shared with Waltzing Regitze)

64th Kinema Junpo Best Ten Awards

- Won: Best Supporting Actress (Kyōko Kagawa)
