= The Long Darkness =

- Theatrical release poster
- Directed by: Kei Kumai
- Screenplay by: Keiji Hasebe; Kei Kumai
- Based on: Shinobu Kawa by Tetsuo Miura
- Produced by: Masayuki Satô; Hideyuki Shiino
- Starring: Komaki Kurihara; Go Kato; Yasushi Nagata
- Cinematography: Kiyomi Kuroda
- Music by: Teizo Matsumura
- Production companies: Haiyu-za Film; Toho
- Distributed by: Toho
- Release date: 25 May 1972 (Japan)
- Running time: 120 minutes
- Country: Japan

The Long Darkness (Japanese: 忍ぶ川, Hepburn: Shinobu Kawa) is a 1972 Japanese drama film directed by Kei Kumai. The film is about a young couple who get together despite the tragedy that befalls their lives. The film received several year end awards from Kinema Junpo and the Mainichi Film Awards.

== Cast ==
- Komaki Kurihara as Shino
- Go Kato as Tetsuro
- Yasushi Nagata as Tetsuro's father
- Kaneko Iwasaki as Kayo - short-sighted sister
- Kinzō Shin as Shino's father
- Hisako Takihana as Tetsuro's mother
- Yûsuke Takita as Yukifusa Kimura
- Hisashi Igawa as Tetsuro's elder brother
- Yasushi Kachi as Fumiya
- Karin Yamaguchi as Aya
- Kin Sugai as Wellwisher on train
- Toshie Kimura as Okami

== Release ==
The Long Darkness was released theatrically in Japan on 25 May 1972 where it was distributed by Toho. The film saw theatrical release in the United States by Toho International with English subtitles in July 1973. It was entered into the 8th Moscow International Film Festival.

== Reception ==
In Japan, Kinema Junpo awarded The Long Darkness with the awards for Best Film, Best Director and Co-Best Screenplay for the year. At the Mainichi Film Award the film won awards for Best Film, Best Actress (Komaki Kurihara), Best Film Score and Best Sound Recording.

== See also ==
- List of Japanese films of 1972
