= Over the Fence (2016 film) =

- Film poster
- Directed by: Nobuhiro Yamashita
- Screenplay by: Ryo Takada
- Based on: Over the Fence by Yasushi Sato
- Produced by: Hideki Hoshino; Hiroyuki Negishi
- Starring: Joe Odagiri; Yū Aoi; Shota Matsuda; Yukiya Kitamura; Shinnosuke Mitsushima; Takumi Matsuzawa; Tsunekichi Suzuki; Yūka
- Cinematography: Ryuto Kondo
- Edited by: Daisuke Imai
- Music by: Takuto Tanaka
- Production companies: Twins Japan; Hikari TV; Iwamoto Metal Co.; IK Entertainment; TBS Holdings; TC Entertainment
- Distributed by: Tokyo Theatres
- Release date: September 17, 2016 (Japan)
- Running time: 112 minutes
- Country: Japan
- Language: Japanese

Over the Fence (Japanese: オーバー・フェンス, Hepburn: Ōbā Fensu) is a 2016 Japanese drama-adventure film by Nobuhiro Yamashita. It stars Joe Odagiri and Yū Aoi. The film is based on Yasushi Sato's novel of the same name, which touches on prevalent societal issues such as divorce and mental health.

== Plot ==
Yoshio Shiraiwa is divorced from his wife who denies him from visiting their only daughter. He returns to his hometown of Hakodate and enrolls at a vocational school specializing in carpentry while receiving unemployment payments. One day, he chances upon an unconventional woman, Satoshi Tamura, in an argument with her boyfriend at the roadside. She imitates the courtship ritual of an ostrich which drove off her boyfriend. However, Yoshio is amused by it. Satoshi notices him and they make eye contact. Yoshio proceeds to leave. At the vocational school, he meets Kazuhisa Daishima who is also training to be a carpenter. One day, Kazuhisa takes him to a cabaret club. Yoshio meets Satoshi again, engaged in a dance. They become close.

== Cast ==
- Joe Odagiri – Yoshio Shiraiwa
- Yū Aoi – Satoshi Tamura
- Shota Matsuda – Kazuhisa Daishima
- Yukiya Kitamura – Koichiro Hara
- Shinnosuke Mitsushima – Yoshito Mori
- Takumi Matsuzawa – Akira Shimada
- Tsunekichi Suzuki – Kenichi Katsumada
- Yūka – Yoko Ogata
