= Taketoshi Naito =

Japanese actor (1926–2012)

- Born: 16 June 1926; Kitakyushu, Fukuoka, Japan
- Died: 21 August 2012 (aged 86)
- Occupation: Actor
- Years active: 1953-2003

Taketoshi Naito (内藤 武敏, Naitō Taketoshi; 16 June 1926 – 21 August 2012) was a Japanese actor. He appeared in more than 70 films between 1953 and 2003. He died of lymphoma on 21 August 2012.

== Selected filmography ==
=== Film ===
- Mahiru no ankoku (1956)
- An Actress (1956) - Akio Satomi
- The Burmese Harp (1956) - Pvt. Kobayashi
- Lucky Dragon No. 5 (1959) - Announcer
- The Scent of Incense (1964) - Murata
- A Chain of Islands (1965) - Hidaka
- The Snow Woman (1968)
- Coup d'Etat (1973) - Army officer
- Manhunt (1976)
- Shogun Assassin (1980)
- The Battle of Port Arthur (1980) - Narrator
- Chōchin (1987)
- Shikibu Monogatari (1990)
- Luminous Moss (1992) - Novelist
- Kamikaze Taxi (1995) - Domon
- My Secret Cache (1997) - Morita
- After Life (1998) - Ichiro Watanabe
- Samurai Fiction (1998) - Kanzen Inukai

=== Television ===
- Minamoto no Yoshitsune (1966) - Hitachibō Kaison
- Ōgon no Hibi (1978) - Akechi Mitsuhide
- Tokugawa Ieyasu (1983) - Honda Masanobu
- Sanga Moyu (1984) - Taketora Matsui
- Musashibō Benkei (1986) - Hōjō Tokimasa
- Takeda Shingen (1988) - Gishū
- Hana no Ran (1994) - Ichijō Kaneyoshi
- Aoi (2000) - Ishida Masatsugu
- Sakura (2002) - Daisaku Akebono
