= Akiko Kumai =

Japanese researcher (1940–2024)

Akiko Kumai (熊井明子, Kumai Akiko; June 11, 1940 – September 21, 2024) was a Japanese writer and researcher focusing on potpourri, known for introducing the fragrant decoration to Japan. She was married to the Japanese film director Kei Kumai.

== Biography ==
Akiko Kumai was born in Matsumoto, Nagano Prefecture, in 1940. After high school in Nagano, she graduated from Shinshu University, where she studied education.

She became an expert in herbs and other aromatic plants, along with her younger sister, the herb researcher Haruko Kirihara (桐原春子). She was inspired to study potpourri after reading about it in a Japanese translation of Chronicles of Avonlea.

Through her work as a researcher and writer, she first introduced potpourri to Japan, prompting a boom in the fragrant decoration's popularity in the early 1980s. She was well known for her essay series "The Potpourri in My Room" (私の部屋のポプリ, Watashi no Heya no Popuri). Throughout her career, she remained a leading authority on potpourri.

In 1999, Kumai was awarded the Yasue Yamamoto Prize for her extensive writing examining the use of scent in the works of Shakespeare, including her book Shakespeare's Scent (シェイクスピアの香り, Shakespeare no Kaori). She also explored scent in other literary works, such as The Tale of Genji. Kumai was known as a cat lover, and she wrote frequently about cats. She was a member of the Japanese PEN International affiliate.

Akiko Kumai was married to the film director Kei Kumai until his death in 2007. The couple collaborated on the book Shakespeare's Hometown (シェイクスピアの故郷, Shakespeare no Furusato), with photographs by Kei and commentary by Akiko. In 2024, at age 84, Akiko Kumai died in Tokyo of coronary artery disease.
