= Teizo Matsumura =

Japanese composer and poet

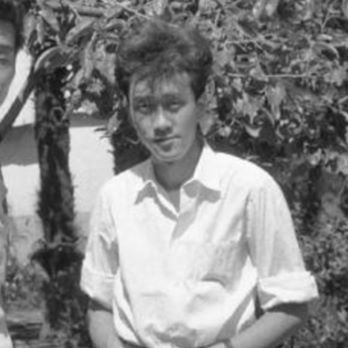
- Matsumura in August 1956
- Born: 15 January 1929; Kyoto, Japan
- Died: 6 August 2007 (aged 78); Tokyo, Japan
- Other name: 松村 禎三
- Occupation: Composer

Teizo Matsumura (松村 禎三 Matsumura Teizō; 15 January 1929 – 6 August 2007) was a Japanese composer and poet. Orphaned and suffering from tuberculosis, during his recovery in the early 1950s he began to write both haiku and music. He studied with Tomojiro Ikenouchi and Akira Ifukube. He was influenced by Ravel and Stravinsky, but also Asian traditions. He was Professor Emeritus of the Tokyo National University of Fine Arts and Music.

Matsumura is best known for his opera Chinmoku (in English Silence) based on the novel of the same name by Shusaku Endo. This has been recorded.

Matsumura is the recipient of the 1974 UNESCO International Rostrum of Composers and of the 1978 Suntory Music Award.

== Major works ==
- Achime for soprano, percussion and 11 players (1957)
- Cryptogame for instrumental ensemble (1958)
- Musique pour quatuor à cordes et pianoforte (1962)
- Symphony No. 1 (1965)
- Prélude pour orchestre (1968)
- Aprasas for female chorus with 2 harps, piano, harpsichord, celesta and string orchestra (1969)
- Totem Ritual for mixed chorus with 8 percussions, piano, harpsichord and orchestra (1969)
- Deux berceuses à la Grèce for piano (1969)
- Poème I for shakuhachi and koto (1969)
- Courtyard of Apsaras for flute, violin and piano (1971)
- Poème II for shakuhachi solo (1972)
- Two Poems by the Prince of Karu for soprano and piano (1973)
- Piano Concerto No. 1 (1973)
- Piano Concerto No. 2 (1978)
- Hymn to Aurora for mixed chorus with cello, harp, percussion, piano, organ and oboe d'amore (1978)
- Fantasy for thirteen-string koto solo (1980)
- Cello Concerto (Concerto per violoncello ed orchestra) (1984)
- Air of Prayer for seventeen-string koto solo (1984)
- Air of Prayer for cello solo (1985)
- Pneuma for strings (1986)
- Trio pour violon, violoncelle et piano (1986)
- Homage to Akira Ifukube for orchestra (1988)
- Silence, opera (1993)
- Nocturne for harp solo (1994)
- Quatuor à cordes (1996)
- Poor Faithful for voice and piano (1996)
- Symphony No. 2 (1998)
- Pilgrimage I - III for piano (1999-2000)
- To the Night of Gethsemane for orchestra (2002)

=== Film score ===
- Flame and Women (1967)
- 100 Gamblers (1969)
- Apart from Life (1970)
- The Long Darkness (1972)
- Rise, Fair Sun (1973)
- Cape of the North (1976)
- Gassan (1979)
- The Sea and Poison (1986)
- Hope and Pain (1988)
- Sen no Rikyu (Death of a Tea Master) (1989)
- Shikibu Monogatari (1990)
- Ronin Gai (1990)
- Luminous Moss (1992)
- Deep River (1995)
- To Love (1997)
- Pickpocket (2000)
- Darkness in the Light (2001)
- The Sea Is Watching (2002)
- A Boy's Summer in 1945 (2002)
- The Face of Jizo (2004)
