= Rise, Fair Sun =

1973 film

- Theatrical release poster
- Directed by: Kei Kumai
- Screenplay by: Hisashi Yamauchi; Akiko Katsura; Kei Kumai
- Produced by: Masayuki Sato; Hideyuki Shiino
- Starring: Tatsuya Nakadai; Kinya Kitaoji; Keiko Sekine
- Cinematography: Kozo Okazaki
- Music by: Teizo Matsumura
- Production companies: Toho; Haiyu-za Film
- Distributed by: Toho
- Release date: 27 October 1973 (Japan)
- Running time: 129 minutes
- Country: Japan
- Language: Japanese

Rise, Fair Sun (Japanese: 朝やけの詩, Hepburn: Asayake no uta) is a 1973 Japanese drama film directed by Kei Kumai and starring Tatsuya Nakadai, Kinya Kitaoji and Keiko Takahashi. It was written by Hisashi Yamauchi, Akiko Katsura and Kumai. It was entered into the 24th Berlin International Film Festival.

== Cast ==
- Tatsuya Nakadai as Sakuzo
- Kinya Kitaoji as Asao, Haruko's lover
- Keiko Takahashi as Haruko, Sakuzo's daughter (as Keiko Sekine)
- Shin Saburi as Inashiro
- Natsuyo Kawakami
- Yôsuke Kondô as Koyama
- Kappei Matsumoto
- Yukiko Takabayashi

== Release ==
Rise, Fair Sun was released theatrically in Japan on 27 October 1973 where it was distributed by Toho.

== Sources ==
- Galbraith IV, Stuart (2008). The Toho Studios Story: A History and Complete Filmography. Scarecrow Press. ISBN 978-1461673743.
