= The Long Death =

- Film poster
- Directed by: Kei Kumai
- Screenplay by: Kei Kumai
- Produced by: Takeo Yanagawa
- Starring: Kinzō Shin; Tanie Kitabayashi; Keiko Yanagawa; Reiko Tanigawa; Mizuho Suzuki
- Cinematography: Kazumi Iwasa
- Edited by: Mutsuo Tanji
- Music by: Akira Ifukube
- Production company: Nikkatsu
- Distributed by: Nikkatsu
- Release date: 12 April 1964 (Japan)
- Running time: 108 minutes
- Country: Japan
- Language: Japanese

The Long Death (Japanese: 帝銀事件 死刑囚, Hepburn: Teigin jiken: Shikeishu; lit. Teigin Incident: Condemned or Teigin Incident: Death Row Prisoner) is a 1964 Japanese docudrama film directed by Kei Kumai. It was Kumai's directorial debut. The screenplay was written by Kumai, who based it on the infamous real-life Teigin incident. The film stars Kinzō Shin as Sadamichi Hirasawa, a painter who was convicted of the crime and sentenced to death despite strong suspicions of his innocence. It co-stars Tanie Kitabayashi, Keiko Yanagawa, Reiko Tanigawa and Mizuho Suzuki in supporting roles. The film's score was composed by Akira Ifukube. The Long Death was theatrically released by Nikkatsu on 12 April 1964, in Japan.

== Premise ==
In 1948, a robbery takes place at the Teigin bank in Tokyo. The robber poisons the employees and flees with stolen cash. Twelve people are killed by the poison. The film follows the parallel investigations of the police and journalists attempting to identify the culprit. The police set their sights on Sadamichi Hirasawa, a local painter. Under torture, he confesses. However, as his trial proceeds, doubts are raised about his guilt, and journalists uncover evidence implicating American occupation officials and a former Imperial military unit in a cover-up.

== Cast ==
- Kinzō Shin as Sadamichi Hirasawa
- Tanie Kitabayashi as Shino Hirasawa
- Keiko Yanagawa as Toshiko
- Reiko Tanigawa as Tomoko
- Mizuho Suzuki as Oonogi
- Yumi Takano as Shino
- Eiken Shoji as Kasahara
- Taketoshi Naito as Takei
- Akifumi Inoue as Agata
- Yuzo Kiura as Kashima
- Daizaburo Hirata as Kitagawa
- Jūkei Fujioka as Oda
- Mikizo Hirata as Inagaki
- Asao Sano as Saeki
- Michio Hino as Kobayashi
- Ikunosuke Koizumi as Natsubori
- Toshiaki Itō as Nashioka
- Tatsuo Matsushita as Kimura
- Takashi Sue as Kunikida
- Kōjirō Kusanagi as Morita
- Binnosuke Nagao as Judge
- Gorō Tarumi as Yamamoto
- Jun Miyazaki as Shoda
- Reiko Sasamori as Masae
- Yoko Yamamoto as Eiko
- Shōbun Inoue
- Toshinosuke Nagao
- Toshizō Kudō
- Keisuke Yukioka
- Akio Miyabe
- Kaku Takashina
- Ichiro Sugai
- Chigusa Takayama

== Background ==
On 26 January 1948, a man entered a branch of the Imperial Bank (Teikoku Ginkō or Teigin) in Shiinamachi, a suburb of Toshima, Tokyo, shortly before closing time. He identified himself as Dr. Jirō Yamaguchi, a public health official sent by United States occupation authorities with orders to inoculate the staff against a sudden outbreak of dysentery. He gave each of the sixteen people present a pill and a few drops of liquid. They drank the liquid, which was later theorized to be "nitrile hydrocyanide", a toxicant originally developed at the Noborito Research Institute. They collapsed to the floor in agony, at which point the robber took some money that was lying on their desks, which amounted to approximately ¥160,000 (about $185 US at the time), but left the majority behind, leaving his motive unclear. Ten of the victims died at the scene (one was a child of an employee), and two others died while hospitalized. A business card was left behind at the scene of the crime.

The police traced the card back to Sadamichi Hirasawa, a tempera painter. A similar amount of money to that stolen from the bank was found in Hirasawa's possession, the origin of which he refused to divulge (it was later suggested by author Seichō Matsumoto that Hirasawa received it from pornographic commissions, a side business that would have been detrimental to his reputation as an artist). However, only two of forty witnesses identified Hirasawa as the poisoner. In addition, Hirasawa's two sons-in-law claimed that he was playing cards with them at the time of the robbery. Handwriting experts had determined that the handwriting on the back of the card was Hirasawa's; he claimed that the card had been stolen from him when he was pickpocketed shortly before the robbery. Hirasawa was arrested on 21 August 1948.

After police interrogation, which allegedly involved torture, Hirasawa confessed, but then recanted soon after. His later defense was based on partial insanity, alleging that he was afflicted with Korsakoff's syndrome as a result of rabies inoculation, and so his confession was not reliable. The court, however, disagreed, and Hirasawa was sentenced to death in 1950 (at that time, a confession was considered solid evidence under the law, even if the police tortured a person to extract said confession). The Supreme Court of Japan upheld the death sentence in 1955. Hirasawa's attorneys tried to have the sentence revoked, submitting eighteen pleas for retrial over the following years.

Successive Japanese Ministers of Justice refused to sign Hirasawa's execution warrant, so the death sentence was never carried out. Even Isaji Tanaka, who on 13 October 1967 announced in front of the press that he had signed the execution warrants of twenty three prisoners all at once, did not sign Hirasawa's warrant, stating that he doubted his guilt.

At trial, the poison pills were determined to be readily obtainable potassium cyanide. However, potassium cyanide results in rapid poisoning, while the robbery victims had experienced slower symptoms. Keio University's contemporary investigation claimed that the actual poison may have been acetone cyanohydrin, a military poison deliberately designed to be slow-acting, which Hirasawa did not have access to. Seichō Matsumoto came to believe that the true culprit was a former member of Unit 731, a theory he covered in his books A Story of the Teikoku Bank Incident (1959) and The Black Fog of Japan (1960).

In 1962, Hirasawa was transferred to Miyagi Detention House. A supporter of Hirasawa's believed the government moved him so he would "die up there faster of natural causes... That way, they can keep his blood off their hands officially." At the time of the film's release, Hirasawa had been incarcerated on death row for fourteen years. He would remain in prison until his death on 10 May 1987, thirty two years after his conviction.

== Production ==
The Long Death was Kei Kumai's directorial debut. He had previously been a screenwriter for various Nikkatsu productions, and had also served as an assistant director on Hideo Sekigawa's Hiroshima (1953). Kumai intended The Long Death to be a protest against Hirasawa's conviction. In 1963, he interviewed Hirasawa at Miyagi Detention House as part of his research for the film. Kumai also interviewed people involved with the investigation and examined the Teigin bank himself.

To film the robbery sequence, a set was constructed using the floor plan of the actual bank. The crime scene was reconstructed down to the exact placement of objects, such as bottles and teacups.

== Release ==
The Long Death was theatrically released by Nikkatsu on 12 April 1964, in Japan. It was also shown at the 2nd Pesaro International Film Festival in 1965.

The film was released to Region 2 DVD on 14 December 2007, individually and as part of a Kumai Nikkatsu box set.

== Reception ==
The film caused a stir even before its release. Hirasawa was reportedly happy with Kumai's depiction of events. In addition, The Long Death was mentioned at the 15 May 1964 meeting of the National Diet's House of Representatives Legal Affairs Committee.
