= Mizuho Suzuki =

Japanese actor (1927–2023)

- 鈴木 瑞穂
- Born: October 23, 1927; Manchuria, Republic of China
- Died: November 19, 2023 (aged 96); Tokyo, Japan
- Occupation: Actor
- Years active: 1952–2014
- Spouse: Mitsue Takada

Mizuho Suzuki (鈴木 瑞穂, Suzuki Mizuho; October 23, 1927 – November 19, 2023) was a Japanese actor. He was a drop-out of Kyoto University. He died on November 19, 2023, at the age of 96.

== Filmography ==
=== Film ===
- The Long Death (1964) as Oonogi
- A Chain of Islands (1965) as Kurosaki
- Yogiri yo Kon'yamo Arigatō (1967)
- Zatoichi the Outlaw (1967)
- The Snow Woman (1968)
- The Sands of Kurobe (1968) as Senda
- Apart from Life (1970)
- Fuji sanchō (1970)
- Battle of Okinawa (1971)
- Submersion of Japan (1973)
- Battles Without Honor and Humanity: Police Tactics (1974) as Chief editor
- Karei-naru Ichizoku (1974) as Kuraishi
- Prophecies of Nostradamus (1974) (Secretary of Environmental Agency)
- Battles Without Honor and Humanity: Final Episode (1974) as Hirate
- Cops vs. Thugs (1975)
- The Bullet Train (1975)
- Proof of the Man (1977) as Yamaji
- Never Give up (1978) as Kuga
- The Demon (1978) (Detective)
- A Distant Cry from Spring (1980)
- Samurai Reincarnation (1981) (Ogasawara Hidekiyo)
- The Gate of Youth (1981) (Narrator)
- The Go Masters (1983)
- The Return of Godzilla (1984) (Foreign Minister Emori)
- Rock yo shizukani nagareyo (1988)
- The Silk Road (1988) (Yeli Renrong)
- Kabei: Our Mother (2008) (Hajime Nikaidō)
- Patisserie Coin de rue (2011)
- In His Chart 2 (2014)

=== Television drama ===
- Shin Heike Monogatari (1972) as Fujiwara no Mitsuyori
- Kunitori Monogatari (1973) as Nichiun
- Ryōma ga Yuku (1982) (Iwakura Tomomi)
- Gorilla: MPD 8th Investigate Group (1989 - 1990) (Aso, Detective Chief of MPD)
- Minamoto no Yoshitsune (1990) (Hōjō Tokimasa)
- Hachidai Shōgun Yoshimune (1995) (Hayashi Hōkō)
- Kenpō wa Madaka (1996) (Shigeru Yoshida)
- Tokugawa Yoshinobu (1998) (Tokugawa Ieyoshi)
- Aoi (2000) as Itakura Katsushige
- Fūrin Kazan (2007) as Uesugi Sadazane

=== Television animation ===
- Sangojō Densetsu: Aoi Umeno Erufi (xxxx) (Nereus)

=== Theatrical animation ===
- Akira (1988) (Doctor Ōnishi)
- Penguin's Memory Shiawase Monogateri (xxxx) (Doctor Mō)

=== Dubbing roles ===
==== Live action ====
- 12 Angry Men (Juror #4 (E. G. Marshall))
- The Adventures of Sherlock Holmes (Prime Minister Belinger (Harry Andrews))
- Ben-Hur (1981 TV Asahi edition) (Quintus Arrius (Jack Hawkins))
- The Bridge on the River Kwai (1976 Fuji TV edition) (Colonel Saito (Sessue Hayakawa))
- Cold Sweat (1979 NTV edition) (Captain Ross (James Mason))
- Columbo: Mind over Mayhem (Doctor Marshall Cahill (José Ferrer))
- Cross of Iron (Colonel Brandt (James Mason))
- The Diary of Anne Frank (Otto Frank (Joseph Schildkraut))
- The Exorcist III (Video edition) (William F. Kinderman (George C. Scott))
- Field of Dreams (Archibald "Moonlight" Graham (Burt Lancaster))
- The Freshman (Carmine Sabatin (Marlon Brando))
- Gladiator (2003 TV Asahi edition) (Marcus Aurelius (Richard Harris))
- Go Tell the Spartans (Major Asa Barker (Burt Lancaster))
- The Godfather (1976 NTV edition) (Vito Corleone (Marlon Brando))
- Lawrence of Arabia (1981 TV Asahi edition) (Edmund Allenby, 1st Viscount Allenby (Jack Hawkins))
- Lethal Weapon 2 (1993 TV Asahi edition) (Arjen Rudd (Joss Ackland))
- Miracle on 34th Street (Kris Kringle (Richard Attenborough))
- The Spy Who Loved Me (1983 TBS edition) (Stromberg (Curd Jürgens))
- Star Wars Episode IV: A New Hope (1983 NTV edition) (Darth Vader)
- The Empire Strikes Back (1980 movie theatre edition) (The Emperor)
- The Empire Strikes Back (1986 NTV edition) (Darth Vader)
- Return of the Jedi (1988 NTV edition) (Darth Vader)

==== Animation ====
- Beauty and the Beast (Narrator)
- The Transformers: The Movie (Unicron)
