= Tora-san's Lullaby =

- Theatrical poster
- Directed by: Yoji Yamada
- Written by: Yoji Yamada; Yoshitaka Asama
- Starring: Kiyoshi Atsumi; Yukiyo Toake
- Cinematography: Tetsuo Takaba
- Edited by: Iwao Ishii
- Music by: Naozumi Yamamoto
- Distributed by: Shochiku
- Release date: December 28, 1974
- Running time: 104 minutes
- Country: Japan
- Language: Japanese

Tora-san's Lullaby (男はつらいよ 寅次郎子守唄, Otoko wa Tsurai yo: Torajirō Komoriuta) is a 1974 Japanese comedy film directed by Yoji Yamada. It stars Kiyoshi Atsumi as Torajirō Kuruma (Tora-san), and Yukiyo Toake as his love interest or "Madonna". Tora-san's Lullaby is the fourteenth entry in the popular, long-running Otoko wa Tsurai yo series. It marks the debut of actor Masami Shimojō in the role of Tora-san's Uncle Tatsuzō. The third actor in this role, Shimojō would play the character until the end of the series.

== Synopsis ==
During his travels Tora-san meets a troubled father with a baby. He shares a drink with the man who then abandons the baby into Tora-san's care. At his hometown in Shibamata, Tokyo, the family is worried about who will take care of the family shop once Tora-san's aunt and uncle have died. Tora-san arrives with the baby causing family and neighbors to speculate that he is the father. The family takes the sickly baby to the hospital where Tora-san falls in love with the nurse, causing complications. The baby's father returns, clearing up misunderstandings.

== Cast ==
- Kiyoshi Atsumi as Torajirō
- Chieko Baisho as Sakura
- Yukiyo Toake as Kyōko Kitani
- Masami Shimojō as Kuruma Tatsuzō
- Chieko Misaki as Tsune Kuruma (Torajiro's aunt)
- Gin Maeda as Hiroshi Suwa
- Hayato Nakamura as Mitsuo Suwa
- Hisao Dazai as Boss (Umetarō Katsura)
- Gajirō Satō as Genkō
- Chishū Ryū as Gozen-sama
- Tsunehiko Kamijō as Yatarō Ōkawa
- Masumi Harukawa as Odoriko

== Critical appraisal ==
Stuart Galbraith IV writes that Tora-san's Lullaby is a "typically fine entry [in the Otoko wa Tsurai yo series] with not much to distinguish it from the rest of the series, though it's still quite good." He writes that by this point in the series, part of the pleasure in the films was in references to past films. He judges the relationship between the baby and Tora-san's Aunt Tsune to be one of the best aspects of the film. It is remembered from films past that Tsune has no children, and that Tora-san and his sister were adopted by their aunt and uncle. The German-language site molodezhnaja gives Tora-san's Lullaby three out of five stars.

== Availability ==
Tora-san's Lullaby was released theatrically on December 28, 1974. In Japan, the film was released on videotape in 1995, and in DVD format in 1995 and 2005.

== Bibliography ==
=== English ===
- "OTOKO WA TSURAI YO TORAJIRO KOMORI UTA (1974)". British Film Institute. Archived from the original on 2012-10-17.
- "OTOKO WA TSURAIYO -TORAJIRO KOMODIUTA". Complete Index to World Film.
- Otoko wa tsurai yo: Torajiro komoriuta (1974) at IMDb
- Galbraith IV, Stuart (2005-11-15). "Tora-san 14: Tora-san's Lullaby (Region 3)". DVD Talk.

=== German ===
- "Tora-San's Lullaby" (in German). www.molodezhnaja.ch.

=== Japanese ===
- 男はつらいよ 寅次郎子守唄 (1974) (in Japanese). allcinema.net.
- "男はつらいよ 寅次郎子守唄". Japanese Cinema Database (Agency for Cultural Affairs). Archived from the original on 2012-02-26.
- 男はつらいよ 寅次郎子守唄 (in Japanese). Japanese Movie Database.
- 男はつらいよ 寅次郎子守唄 (in Japanese). Kinema Junpo. Archived from the original on 2012-03-09.
