= The Sea Is Watching =

- DVD cover
- Directed by: Kei Kumai
- Screenplay by: Akira Kurosawa; Kei Kumai
- Based on: Nanno hana ka kaoru by: Shūgorō Yamamoto; Tsuyu no hinu ma; Shūgorō Yamamoto
- Produced by: Kōshirō Andō; Sunobu Horigome; Haruyuki Machida; Kōichi Miyagawa; Yūji Oda; Naoto Sarukawa; Hajime Satomi; Shigehiro Toriyama; Hirotake Yoda
- Starring: Misa Shimizu; Nagiko Tōno; Masatoshi Nagase; Hidetaka Yoshioka
- Cinematography: Kazuo Okuhara
- Edited by: Osamu Inoue
- Music by: Teizo Matsumura
- Distributed by: Nikkatsu; TriStar Pictures (USA)
- Release date: 27 July 2002 (Japan)
- Running time: 119 minutes
- Country: Japan
- Language: Japanese

The Sea Is Watching (Japanese: 海は見ていた, Hepburn: Umi wa Miteita) is a 2002 Japanese romantic drama film directed by Kei Kumai, based on a screenplay by Akira Kurosawa, which was adapted from two separate novels by Shūgorō Yamamoto. It was Kurosawa's final screen credit, as well as Kumai's final film.

== Cast ==
- Misa Shimizu – Kikuno
- Nagiko Tōno – Oshin
- Masatoshi Nagase – Ryosuke
- Hidetaka Yoshioka – Fusanosuke
- Miho Tsumiki – Okichi
- Michiko Kawai – Osono
- Yumiko Nogawa – Omine
- Tenshi Kamogawa – Umekichi
- Yukiya Kitamura – Gonta
