= Luminous Moss (film) =

1992 film

- DVD cover
- Directed by: Kei Kumai
- Written by: Taijun Takeda; Kei Kumai
- Produced by: Taketoshi Naito
- Starring: Rentarō Mikuni; Hisashi Igawa; Satoko Iwasaki; Taketoshi Naito; Eiji Okuda
- Cinematography: Masao Tochizawa
- Edited by: Osamu Inoue
- Music by: Teizo Matsumura
- Release date: 25 April 1992 (Japan)
- Running time: 118 minutes
- Country: Japan
- Language: Japanese

Luminous Moss (Japanese: ひかりごけ, Hepburn: Hikarigoke) is a 1992 Japanese horror film directed by Kei Kumai and produced by actor Taketoshi Naito. It was entered into the 42nd Berlin International Film Festival. The film received a DVD release in 2001 in Japan, though it hasn't received a home video release in other countries as of yet.

== Cast ==
- Rentarō Mikuni as Headmaster / Ship Captain
- Hisashi Igawa as Prosecutor
- Satoko Iwasaki
- Taketoshi Naito as Novelist
- Eiji Okuda as Nishikawa
- Chishū Ryū as Judge
- Tetta Sugimoto as Goro
- Kunie Tanaka as Hachizo
- Masane Tsukayama as Lawyer

== See also ==
- Schistostega
