= A Long Walk (film) =

2006 Japanese film

- Directed by: Eiji Okuda
- Written by: Eiji Okuda] Sakura Momoyama; Yukiko Yamamuro
- Starring: Ken Ogata, Hana Sugiura, Saki Takaoka, Shota Matsuda, Eiji Okuda
- Release date: 2006
- Running time: 136 minutes
- Language: Japanese

A Long Walk (長い散歩, Nagai Sanpo) is a 2006 film directed by Japanese director Eiji Okuda. It won the "Grand Prix des Amériques" award at the Montreal World Film Festival.

== Cast ==
- Ken Ogata as Yasutaro Matsuda
- Saki Takaoka as Mayumi Yokoyama
- Hana Sugiura as Sachi
- Shota Matsuda as Wataru
- Tomokazu Ōhashi
- Kiwako Harada
- Sakura Ando
- Masa Yamada
- Midori Kiuchi
- Masahiko Tsugawa
- Eiji Okuda
