= Kei Kumai =

Japanese film director (1930–2007)

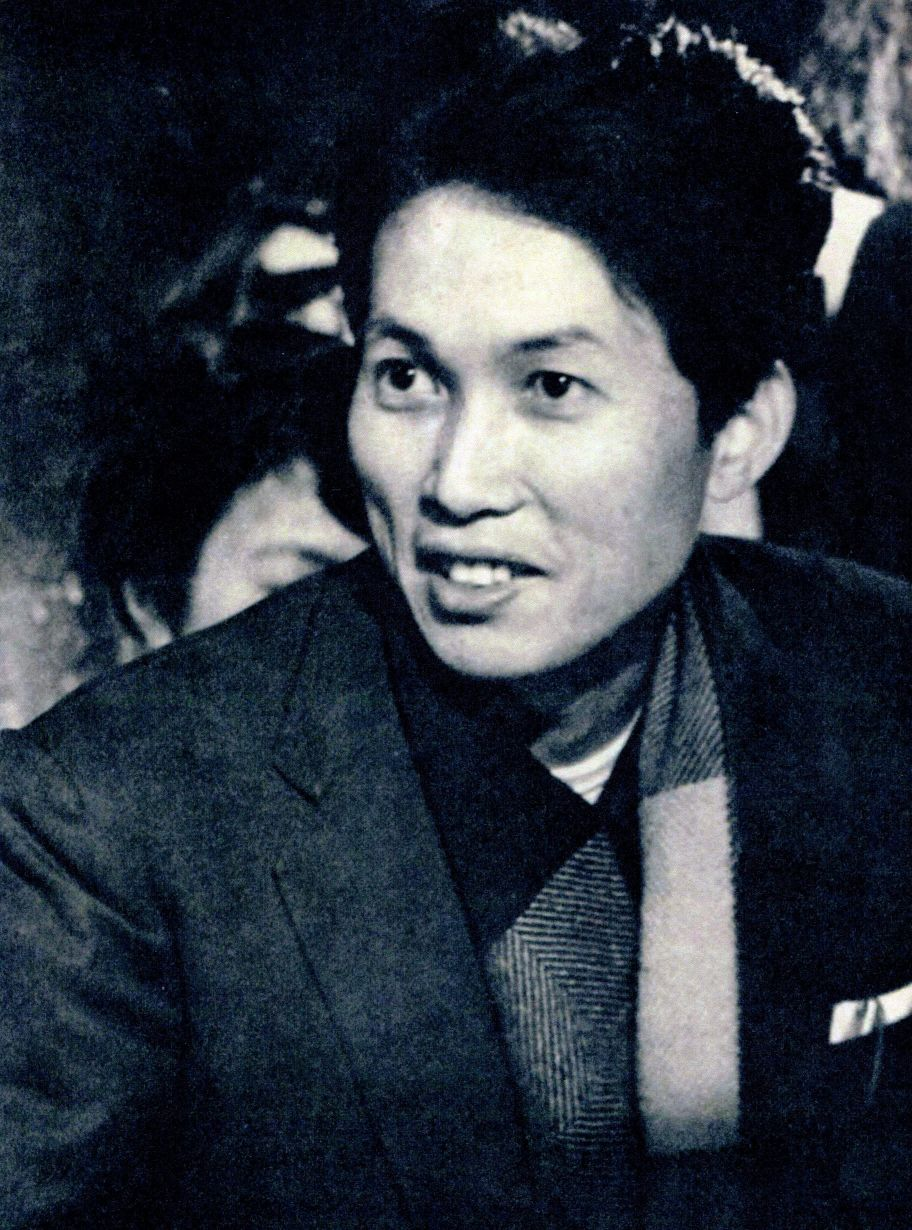
- Born: 1 June 1930; Azumino, Nagano Prefecture, Japan
- Died: 23 May 2007 (aged 76)
- Occupation: Film director
- Spouse: Akiko Kumai

Kei Kumai (熊井 啓, Kumai Kei; 1 June 1930 – 23 May 2007) was a Japanese film director. After his studies in literature at Shinshu University, he began work as a director's assistant.

He won the Directors Guild of Japan New Directors Award for his second film, Nihon rettō, in 1965. His 1972 film Shinobu Kawa was entered into the 8th Moscow International Film Festival. His 1973 film Rise, Fair Sun was entered into the 24th Berlin International Film Festival.

Sandakan No. 8 received widespread acclaim for tackling the issue of a woman forced into prostitution in Borneo before the outbreak of World War II. Kinuyo Tanaka won the Best Actress Award at the 25th Berlin International Film Festival for her performance. The film was nominated for the Best Foreign Language Film at the 48th Academy Awards.

Kumai's follow-up film was 1976's Cape of North, starring French actress Claude Jade as a Swiss nun who falls in love with a Japanese engineer on a trip from Marseilles to Yokohama. His 1986 film The Sea and Poison won the Silver Bear - Special Jury Prize at the 37th Berlin International Film Festival. In 1992, his film Luminous Moss was entered into the 42nd Berlin International Film Festival.

Other works include Death of a Tea Master starring Toshirō Mifune as Sen no Rikyū (Silver Lion at the 46th Venice International Film Festival), and the 2002 film The Sea Is Watching, based on Akira Kurosawa's posthumous script.

Kumai was married to the writer and researcher Akiko Kumai. He died in 2007 at age 76.

== Filmography ==
- Mutekiga Ore o Yondeiru (1960) (screenplay)
- Otoko to otoko no ikiru machi (1962) (screenplay)
- The Long Death (1964)
- A Chain of Islands (1965)
- The Sands of Kurobe (1968)
- Apart from Life (1970)
- Shinobu Kawa (1972)
- Rise, Fair Sun (1973)
- Sandakan No. 8 (1974)
- Cape of the North (1976)
- Ogin-sama (1978)
- Tempyō no Iraka (1980)
- Nihon no Atsui Hibi Bōsatsu: Shimoyama Jiken (1981)
- The Sea and Poison (1986)
- Death of a Tea Master (1989)
- Shikibu Monogatari (1990)
- Luminous Moss (1992)
- Deep River (1995)
- To Love (1997)
- Darkness in the Light (2001)
- The Sea Is Watching (2002)
