= Death of a Tea Master =

- Film poster
- Directed by: Kei Kumai
- Screenplay by: Yoshikata Yoda
- Based on: Hongakubō ibun by Yasushi Inoue
- Starring: Eiji Okuda; Toshiro Mifune; Yorozuya Kinnosuke
- Cinematography: Masao Tochizawa
- Edited by: Osamu Inoue
- Music by: Teizo Matsumura
- Production company: Seiyu
- Distributed by: Toho
- Release dates: October 7, 1989 (Japan); May 1, 1990 (United States)
- Running time: 107 minutes
- Country: Japan
- Language: Japanese

Death of a Tea Master (Japanese: 千利休 本覺坊遺文, Hepburn: Sen no Rikyu: Honkakubô ibun), also known as Sen no Rikyū: Honkakubo's Student Writings, is a 1989 Japanese biographical drama film directed by Kei Kumai. It is an adaptation of the novel Hongakubō ibun by Yasushi Inoue, which is based on real life events of Sen no Rikyū during the late Muromachi period, particularly the events surrounding his ritual suicide. It was entered into the main competition at the 46th Venice International Film Festival, in which it won the Silver Lion. Toho released the film on October 7, 1989, in Japan.

== Cast ==
- Eiji Okuda as Honkakubo
- Toshiro Mifune as Sen no Rikyū
- Yorozuya Kinnosuke as Oda Urakusai
- Gō Katō as Furuta Oribe
- Shinsuke Ashida as Toyotomi Hideyoshi
