= Yukiya Kitamura =

Japanese actor (born 1974)

- 北村 有起哉
- Born: April 29, 1974 (age 52); Tokyo, Japan
- Education: Tokyo Metropolitan Institute Fuji High School; Japan Institute of the Moving Image
- Occupation: Actor
- Years active: 1998–present
- Agent: Tom company
- Spouse: Shiho Takano (m. 2013)
- Children: 2
- Relatives: Kazuo Kitamura (father)
- Website: Official profile

Yukiya Kitamura (北村 有起哉, Kitamura Yukiya; born April 29, 1974, in Tokyo, Japan) is a Japanese actor represented by Tom company. His father is actor Kazuo Kitamura and his wife is actress Shiho Takano.

== Biography ==
While in Tokyo Metropolitan Institute Fuji High School, Kitamura was interested in theater and wants to be an aspiring actor. He later studied acting at the Japan Institute of the Moving Image and in 1998 he debuted in the stage play Spring Awakening and the film Dr. Akagi. Kitamura perform at stage shows but he does not belong to a specific theater company and in recent years he appeared in a number of television dramas. On 2016 his first starring film role was Taiyō no Futa.

On June 4, 2013, Kitamura married actress Shiho Takano after dating for four years. He later announced in his blog that she later gave birth to male child in November 2014.

== Filmography ==
=== Film ===
Year	Title	Role	Notes	Ref.
1998	Dr. Akagi			
1999	Jigoku: Japanese Hell	Suda		
2000	Hasen no Maris			
2000	Tales of the Unusual	Man of the couple	Segment: "The Marriage Simulator"	
2000	Darkness in the Light	Koji Asakwa		
2001	Siberia Chō Tokkyū 2	Maruyama		
2001	Warm Water Under a Red Bridge	Sintaro Uomi		
2002	The Sea Is Watching	Gonta		
2004	Kusa no Ran	Morikura Iizuka		
2006	Stone Age			
2006	Trick Gekijō-ban 2	Ginzo Sano		
2006	Backdancers!	DJ Ken		
2007	Chōshū Five	Inoue Kaoru		
2008	Kurosagi	Takao Reiji		
2008	Sekai de Ichiban Utsukushī Yoru			
2008	Peeping Tom	Joji Sasaki		
2009	Play Cards When You Die	Ichiro Sasaki	Lead role	
2010	Hanjirō	Ōkubo Toshimichi		
2010	Sakurada Gate Incident	Ryusuke Ando		
2012	I'm Flash!	Kaoru Yoshino		
2015	Kakekomi	Torii Yōzō		
2016	Taiyō no Futa	Nabeshima	Lead role	
2016	Over the Fence	Koichiro Hara		
2017	Sekigahara	Ii Naomasa		
2018	Hibiki	Hitoshi Kijima		
2019	Fortuna's Eye	Takeo Kurokawa		
2019	Almost a Miracle	Ayuta Machida		
2019	A Long Goodbye	Imamura		
2019	The Journalist	Jin'no		
2020	The Asadas	Kenzo Shibukawa		
2020	All the Things We Never Said	Killer		
2021	Under the Open Sky	Iguchi		
2021	A Family	Nakamura		
2022	Prior Convictions	Naoharu Takamatsu		
2022	A Hundred Flowers			
2022	Old School	Shinjirō Renjō	Lead role	
2023	Life of Mariko in Kabukicho			
2023	Eternal New Mornings	Takeaki Satomi		
2023	Goldfish	Haru		
2023	The Water Flows to the Sea			
2023	Masked Hearts			
2023	Kyrie	Negishi		
2024	Samurai Detective Onihei: Blood for Blood	Jingorō		
2024	The Parades			
2025	Hold Me Tighter Than Anyone	Dr. Sakura		
2025	Fiamma	Nojima	Lead role	
2026	The A-Care: Disusebody	Shuntaro Yagura		
2026	The Secret Battlefield	Fumimaro Konoe		
2026	Children Untold	Detective		

=== TV series ===
Year	Title	Role	Notes	Ref.
2005	Yoshitsune	Goashi	Taiga drama	
2011	Gō	Toyotomi Hidetsugu	Taiga drama	
2012	Man of Destiny	Ryo Kiyohara		
2013	Yae's Sakura	Akizuki Teijirō	Taiga drama	
2015	Aka Medaka	Dandan Tachikawa		
2016	Chikaemon	Takemoto Gidayū		
2016	Kaitō Yamaneko	Kenichiro Todo		
2016	The Woman who Took the Local Paper	Hayao Shiota	TV movie	
2017	Laugh It Up!		Asadora	
2018	Segodon	Ōyama Tsunayoshi	Taiga drama	
2019	Hotaru-gusa			
2020	Pareto's Miscalculation	Detective Wakabayashi		
2020	Yell	Jirō Ikeda	Asadora	
2021	Prisonization	Sōsuke Jinnai	Lead role	
2021	Zenkamono	Naoharu Takamatsu		
2022	A Day-Off of Ryunosuke Kamiki		Episode 7	
2022	Lost Man Found	Hirayama		
2023	The Makanai: Cooking for the Maiko House	Takeshi Ishida		
2024–25	Omusubi	Masato Yoneda	Asadora	
2025	Simulation: Defeat in the Summer of 1941	Fumimaro Konoe	Miniseries	
2025	When I was a Child Everything Was Fine	Wataru Ogura	Lead role	
2026	Reboot	Wataru Goroku		
2027	The Shogunate Rebel	Oguri Tadataka	Taiga drama	
