= Eiji Okuda =

Japanese actor and film director (born 1950)

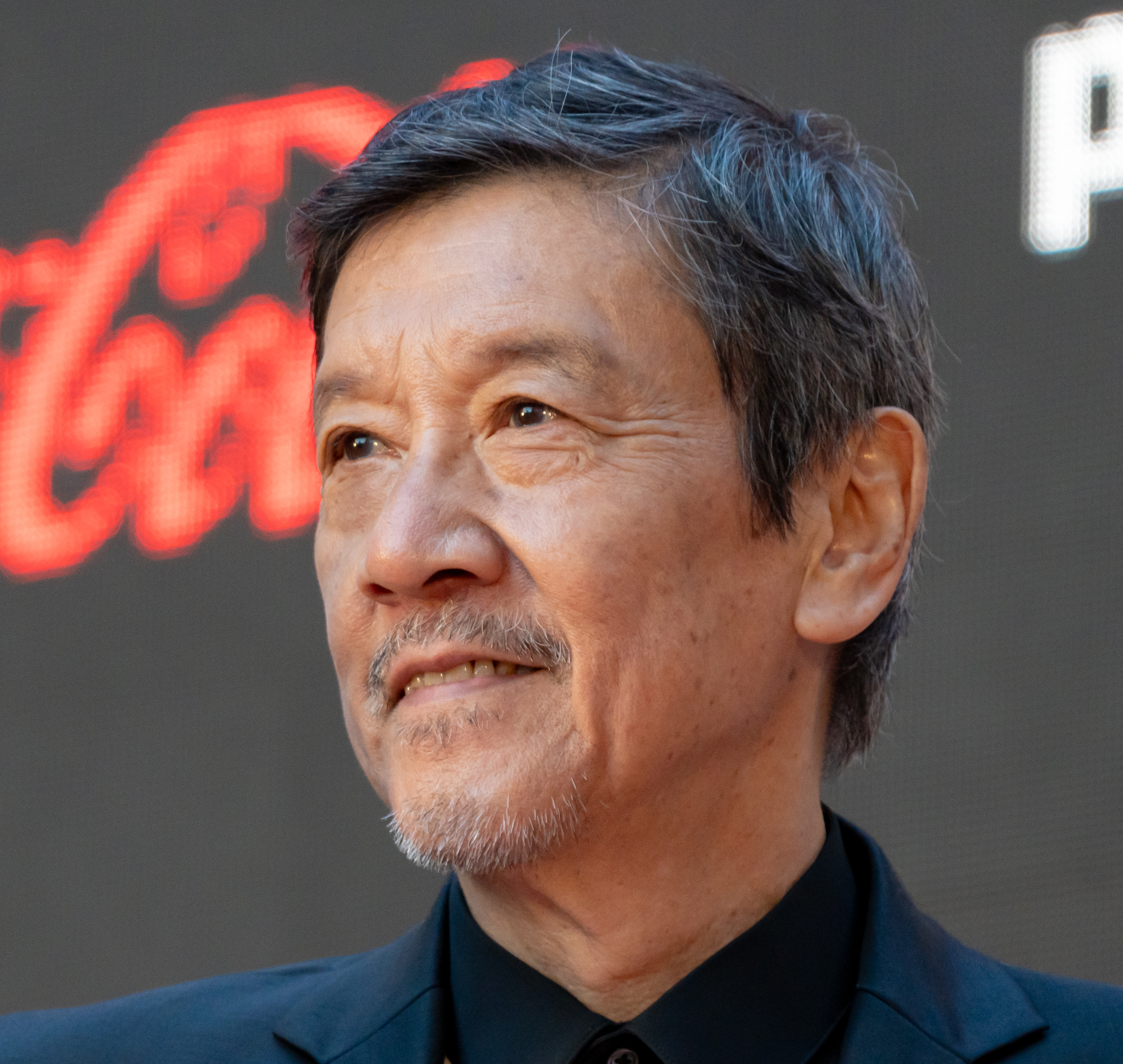
- Okuda in 2023
- Born: Toyoake Andō; 18 March 1950 (age 76); Kasugai, Aichi, Japan
- Occupations: Actor and film director
- Years active: 1976–present
- Spouse: Kadu Ando (m. 1974)
- Children: Momoko Ando; Sakura Ando
- Relatives: Takeru Inukai (father-in-law); Tasuku Emoto (son-in-law)

Eiji Okuda (奥田瑛二, Okuda Eiji; born 18 March 1950) is a Japanese actor and film director. Born in Kasugai, Aichi, he was nominated for the Best Actor award at the 1990 Japanese Academy Awards for his performance in Sen no Rikyu. He won the award for best actor at the 37th Blue Ribbon Awards for Like a Rolling Stone.

He made his directing debut in 2001, and has taken leading roles in front of the camera in the three films he has directed as of 2006.

He appeared in the Brazilian soap opera Morde & Assopra, of 2011, as a scientist in the first chapter. He also appeared in the film Dirty Hearts, also released in 2011, this time as the character Colonel Watanabe, officer of the Japanese Imperial Army, leader of Shindo Renmei and the great villain of the film.

== Selected filmography ==
=== Actor ===
==== Films ====
- 1982 The Last Hero, Muneyuki Ogata
- 1983 Theater of Life, Hayao Fukioka
- 1986 The Sea and Poison, Suguro
- 1989 Death of a Tea Master
- 1990 Shikibu Monogatari, Toyoichi Otomo
- 1991 The Pianist
- 1992 Luminous Moss
- 1994 Like a Rolling Stone
- 1998 Pride, Ichirō Kiyose
- 1999 Minazuki
- 2001 An Adolescent
- 2004 Déracine
- 2004 Runin: Banished
- 2005 Yamato, Captain Kōsaku Aruga
- 2006 A Long Walk
- 2009 Goemon, Toyotomi Hideyoshi
- 2009 Be Sure to Share
- 2011 Dirty Hearts
- 2012 Rurouni Kenshin, Yamagata Aritomo
- 2015 Blood Bead
- 2016 64: Part I, Arakida
- 2016 64: Part II, Arakida
- 2016 If Cats Disappeared from the World
- 2016 The Old Capital
- 2018 Smokin' on the Moon
- 2018 Samurai's Promise
- 2019 According To Our Butler, Ōtori
- 2019 Diner
- 2019 Born Bone Born
- 2019 Iwane: Sword of Serenity
- 2020 One in a Hundred Thousand
- 2020 Independence of Japan
- 2021 Peaceful Death
- 2021 Nishinari Goro's 400 Million Yen
- 2021 Detective Chinatown 3
- 2021 99.9 Criminal Lawyer: The Movie, Shūichi Ōtomo
- 2021 1921
- 2022 Niwatori Phoenix
- 2022 Akira and Akira, Kazuo Haneda
- 2022 Goodbye Cruel World, yakuza boss
- 2023 Kumo to Saru no Kazoku
- 2023 A Spoiling Rain
- 2023 Wheels and Axle
- 2024 Stay Mum, Kōzō
- 2026 Euthanasia Special Zone
- 2026 The Secret Battlefield, Kōichi Kido
- 2027 All That Exists, Shigeru Kijima

==== Television ====
- 1976 Enban Sensō Bankid, Noboru Tenma/Bankid Pegasus
- 1983 Tokugawa Ieyasu – Matsudaira Katsutaka
- 1984–85 Miyamoto Musashi – Hon'iden Matahachi
- 1987 Dokuganryū Masamune – Ishida Mitsunari
- 1994 Hana no Ran – Ikkyū
- 2001 Hojo Tokimune, Nichiren
- 2013 Yae's Sakura – Sakuma Shōzan
- 2015 Burning Flower – Tamaki Bun'noshin
- 2015 Keisei Saimin no Otoko Part 2 – Kiyochika Iwashita
- 2016 Kyoaku wa Nemurasenai – Kiichi Hase
- 2017 Black Leather Notebook – Kenji Narabayashi
- 2019 An Artist of the Floating World
- 2019 Manpuku
- 2023 Ranman – Ōhata Gihei
- 2025 Simulation: Defeat in the Summer of 1941 – Kōichi Kido
- 2026 Brothers in Arms – Horiike Yorimasa

=== Director ===
- 2001 Shōjo a.k.a. An Adolescent
- 2004 Runin: Banished
- 2006 A Long Walk
- 2008 Kaze no sotogawa a.k.a. Out of the Wind
- 2013 Kyoko to Shuichi no baai a.k.a. Case of Kyoko, Case of Shuichi

=== Dubbing ===
- 1980 The Empire Strikes Back a.k.a. Luke Skywalker (Mark Hamill)
- 1982 A New Hope a.k.a. Luke Skywalker (Mark Hamill)

=== Video games ===
- 2012 Yakuza 5 – det. Kazuhiko Serizawa/Tsubasa Kurosawa

== Personal life ==
Okuda is married to writer Kazu Andō and they have two daughters, film director Momoko Ando and actress Sakura Ando.
