= Apart from Life =

1970 film

- Theatrical release poster
- Directed by: Kei Kumai
- Written by: Mitsuharu Inoue; Kei Kumai
- Starring: Mizuho Suzuki; Hiroko Kino; Mugihito; Sen Hara; Tanie Kitabayashi
- Cinematography: Naoyuki Sumitani
- Edited by: Mutsuo Tanji
- Music by: Teizo Matsumura
- Production companies: Art Theatre Guild; Elf Productions
- Distributed by: Art Theatre Guild
- Release date: 31 January 1970 (Japan)
- Running time: 127 minutes
- Country: Japan
- Language: Japanese

Apart from Life (Japanese: 地の群れ, Hepburn: Chi no mure) is a 1970 Japanese drama film directed by Kei Kumai. It was written by Mitsuharu Inoue and Kumai.

The film was entered into the 20th Berlin International Film Festival.

== Cast ==
- Mizuho Suzuki as Unami
- Hiroko Kino as Noriko Fukuji
- Mugihito as Nobuo Tsuyama (as Makoto Terada)
- Sen Hara as Kaneyo, Nobuo's grandmother
- Tanie Kitabayashi as Matsuko Fukuji
- Noriko Matsumoto as Eiko, Unami's wife
- Tomoko Naraoka as Mitsuko
- Asao Sano as Yuji, Mitsuko's husband
- Jūkichi Uno as Shigeo Miyaji

== Awards and nominations ==
At the 25th Mainichi Film Awards, the film won Best Supporting Actress for Tomoko Naraoka (shared for her role in Dodesukaden), and Best Music for Teizo Matsumura. At the 44th Kinema Junpo Awards, the film took fifth place in the Top 10 Japanese Films ranking.
