= Akimoto Matsuyo =

Japanese playwright

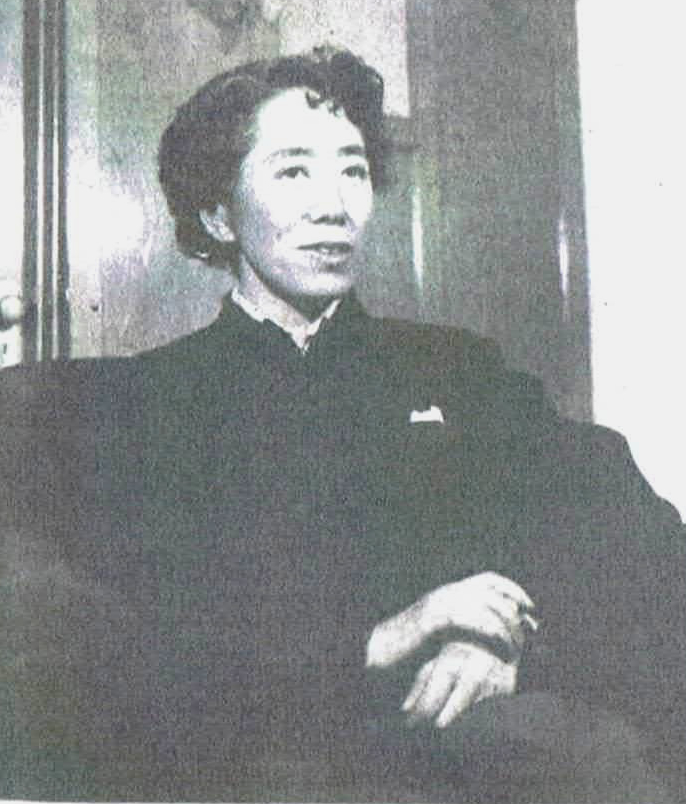
Akimoto Matsuyo

Akimoto Matsuyo (秋元松代, 2 January 1911 – 24 April 2001) was a leading playwright of postwar Japan, most respected as a realist Japanese playwright. Akimoto was known for her shingeki plays, but also wrote some classical bunraku (puppet) and kabuki dramas, and she later became a scriptwriter for both radio and television shows. Along with Akimoto's childhood, World War II played a significant role in her career. As a realist playwright, she used her work to make political statements in order to warn the greater Japanese community that the government was trying to continue their pre-war imperial system of capitalism, militarism, and patriarchy.

== Childhood ==
Akimoto was born in Yokohama on January 2, 1911, to a family of six consisting of her mother, father, and four older brothers. One of her brothers was Fujio Akimoto, a haiku poet.

When Akimoto was age three, her father died. In addition to her father's death at a young age, she was diagnosed with pleurisy when she was in the third grade. Due to Akimoto's fatigue from her illness and her family's belief in traditional gender roles, the family did not see the need for Akimoto to extend her education, so she attended public school for the minimum number of years required.

For many years of her childhood, Akimoto was homeschooled with the help of her two older brothers. It was her brothers' novels, which were accessible to her in the house as a child, that sparked her fascination with drama. She became a voracious reader as child and acquired theatrical language from reading Japanese classics that later helped develop her career as a playwright.

She gained inspiration to be a part of the literary field from reading western Greek tragedies, Ibsen's modern plays, Japanese noh plays, and Chikamatsu Monzaemon's jōruri during her childhood.

== Career ==
In 1945 at the age of 34 she became a student at the Drama Workshop Gikyoku Kenkyū (The Society of Drama Study) which was founded by leftist playwright Miyoshi Jūrō (1902-1958), a leading playwright of the time. Not only did Miyoshi encourage Akimoto to write professionally, but he also inspired her. While, Akimoto disregarded comments that pertained to her as a disciple of Miyoshi, she was nevertheless influenced by his works of humanism, communism, and nationalism. In 1947 she debuted A Sprinkling of Dust with Miyoshi's expertise.

At the age of 35 and end of WWII, she became a professional playwright. She wrote for major shingeki companies, and even got to run her own company Theatre Troupe Engekza from 1967 to 1970. Akimoto wrote her plays in a realist style with a focus on interpersonal family relationships.

"I want to use dialect in such a way that when hearing the dialogue, any person from the above areas will feel that is the language of their area…I feel that is a form of dialogue that people from Tokyo and other areas far away can understand and relate to" - Akimoto

However, in her later plays she strayed from her realists approach and switched to a shamaness style that incorporated dark poetry in order to capture her vision on how she saw the Japanese community of her time. This can be seen in her award-winning masterpiece Kaison of Priest of Hitachi (1967 translated 1988) where the dialogue was used to present Japan's postwar culture. Her interest in human suffering and her compassion for those who suffer no doubt reflected her own experience as a child.

A recurring theme in many of Akimoto's work is the human quest for redemption. This theme can happen in several of ways: redemption from feeling guilty or ashamed, from affliction of physical or emotional suffering, from exploitation, or from death. Redemption is a consistent theme in all of Akimoto's works that in any play you will find that the main character is searching for some way to release themselves and others from what is holding them back from their quest. Many of Akimoto's main characters encounter either a social, political, or religious entity to guide them in their quest for redemption, but one of these systems obstructs them from doing so. By shining light on Japan's government through these types of references in her plays Akimoto was able to warn the Japanese community that the government does not want them to find redemption, but wanted their support in their pre-war empire efforts.

== Major works ==
The following year after Akimoto enrolled into Miyoshi's Drama Workshop Gikyoku Kenkyū she published her first play Keijin (The Light Dust) in the journal Gekisaku in 1946. 1949 was when her second play, Mourning Clothes (Reifuku), was published, and when her career started to take off working with important directors such as Koreya Senda and Yukio Ninagawa who staged her plays.

There was a time in her career where she felt under appreciated as a playwright. So she stopped writing plays for a while and chose to become a scriptwriter for radio and television shows instead, but did not make what she hoped to get out of it. Regardless, her play Kaision of Priest of Hitachi won over Hanada Kiyoteru, a well-known critic in 1967 at the Engeki Theatre and since then her plays have been performed.

In Akimoto's work death reoccurs and the various Japanese customs developed to conquer it. Topics included mourning which can be found in (Mourning Clothes, 1949), immortality in (The Life of Muraoka Iheji, 1960), and shinkō shūkyō, or "new religions" in (Thoughts on our Lady of Scabs, 1968). Her 1964 work, Kaison the Priest of Hitachi, deals with a group of boys whose parents die in the 1945 firebombing of Tokyo, this play is considered to be a landmark in Japanese drama. Despite her serious and often tragic topics, one of Akimoto's strengths lies in injecting comic elements into her plays.

Her collected works were published in five volumes in 2002, a year after her death.

== Namesake awards ==
In 1964 Akimoto received the Toshiko Tamura Award Gay Art Festival Award for her play Hitachi Boumimikoto.

In 1969 she received the Mainichi Art Award.

Then in 1975 she won the Yomiuri Literary Award for her play Nana-nin Misaki This play was popular all across Japan that it was also awarded the Purple Ribbon the following years in 1979.

In 2001, the year of Akimoto's death, the Asahi Shimbun newspaper established the Asahi Awards for the Theater Arts (Asahi Butai Geijutsu Shō). The annual Asahi Awards consist of five prizes, one of which is named after Akimoto Matsuyo and is awarded for "theatrical works, individuals, or organizations that have succeeded in combining popular entertainment with artistic merit."
