= Hideyoshi (TV series) =

- Genre: Taiga drama
- Written by: Yō Takeyama
- Directed by: Yoshiki Nishimura
- Starring: Naoto Takenaka; Yasuko Sawaguchi; Masanobu Takashima; Hiroaki Murakami; Takako Matsu; Hidekazu Akai; Toru Watanabe; Mayo Suzukaze; Narimi Arimori; Mitsuko Yorichika; Naomi Hosokawa; Atsushi Onita; Yasunori Danta; Masahiko Nishimura; Saburō Shinoda; Masatō Ibu; Kōji Tamaki; Akira Nakao; Yōko Nogiwa; Joe Shishido; Masakane Yonekura; Ichirō Zaitsu; Ikkō Furuya; Etsuko Ichihara; Hiroyuki Sanada; Tatsuya Nakadai; Tetsuya Watari
- Opening theme: NHK Symphony Orchestra
- Composer: Reijirō Koroku
- Country of origin: Japan
- Original language: Japanese
- No. of episodes: 49

Production
- Running time: 45 minutes

Original release
- Network: NHK
- Release: January 7 – December 22, 1996

Hideyoshi (秀吉) is a 1996 Japanese historical television series. It is the 35th NHK taiga drama television series.

== Plot ==
The story chronicles the life of Toyotomi Hideyoshi.

== Production ==
Production Credits

- Original – Taichi Sakaiya
- Music – Reijirō Koroku
- Titling – Hisaya Morishige
- Narrator – Etsuko Ichihara, Ryuji Miyamoto
- Historical research – Tetsuo Owada
- Sword fight arranger - Kunishirō Hayashi

== Cast ==
Starring role

- Naoto Takenaka as Hideyoshi

=== Toyotomi clan ===
- Yasuko Sawaguchi as One - wife of Hideyoshi
- Etsuko Ichihara as Naka - mother of Hideyoshi
- Ichiro Zaitsu as Chikuami - stepfather of Hideyoshi
- Masanobu Takashima as Toyotomi Hidenaga - younger brother of Hideyoshi
- Naomi Hosokawa as Sato - younger sister of Hideyoshi
- Takako Matsu as Cha-cha - concubine of Hideyoshi
- Hiroyuki Sanada as Ishida Mitsunari
  - Shun Oguri as Sakichi (young Mitsunari)
- Atsushi Onita as Hachisuka Masakatsu
- Ikkō Furuya as Takenaka Hanbei
- Masatō Ibu as Kuroda Kanbei
- Yosuke Asari as young Ukita Hideie

=== Oda clan ===
- Tetsuya Watari as Oda Nobunaga
- Hiroaki Murakami as Akechi Mitsuhide
- Narimi Arimori as Tsumaki Hiroko - wife of Mitsuhide
- Yōko Nogiwa as Omaki no kata - mother of Mitsuhide
- Eriko Tamura as Akechi Tama
- Mitsuko Yorichika as Oichi - younger sister of Nobunaga
- Akira Nakao as Shibata Katsuie
- Yasunori Danta as Takigawa Kazumasu
- Saburō Shinoda as Niwa Nagahide
- Masahiro Matsuoka as Mori Ranmaru
- Hideo Takamatsu as Hayashi Sado no Kami
- Samy Pop as Yasuke
- Junkichi Orimoto as Sakuma Nobumori
- Toru Watanabe as Maeda Toshiie
- Azusa Nakamura as Maeda Matsu

=== Tokugawa clan ===
- Masahiko Nishimura as Tokugawa Ieyasu
- Joe Shishido as Honda Masanobu
- Naoya Makoto as Ishikawa Kazumasa
- Ryū Manatsu as Sakai Tadatsugu
- Maki Ishikawa as Lady Tsukiyama
- Shin'ichirō Satō as Matsudaira Nobuyasu

=== Others ===
- Hidekazu Akai as Ishikawa Goemon - best friend of Hideyoshi
- Mayo Suzukaze as Otaki - wife of Goemon
- Tatsuya Nakadai as Sen no Rikyū - a tea master
- Kōji Tamaki as Ashikaga Yoshiaki - the 15th and last shogun of the Ashikaga shogunate
- Aki Yashiro as Osen
- Osamu Saka as Satomura Joha
- Terry O'Brien as Luís Fróis
- Masakane Yonekura as Imagawa Yoshimoto
- Ryūnosuke Kaneda as Saitō Dōsan
- Kiyoshi Nakajō as Ankokuji Ekei

== TV schedule ==
Episode	Original airdate	Title	Directed by	Rating
1	January 7, 1996	"Taiyō no Ko" (太陽の子, Child of the Sun)	Mikio Satō	26.6%
2	January 14, 1996	"Okehazama no Kiseki" (桶狭間の奇跡, Miracle at Okehazama)	Mikio Satō	29.2%
3	January 21, 1996	"Unmei no Hanayome" (運命の花嫁, The Bride of Fate)	Rintarō Mayuzumi	33.5%
4	January 28, 1996	"Ōgon Kyōdai" (黄金兄弟, The Golden Brothers)	Rintarō Mayuzumi	33.1%
5	February 4, 1996	"Otoko no Nedan" (男の値段, The Price of a Man)	Mikio Satō	34.6%
6	February 11, 1996	"Ichiya-jō" (一夜城, THe Overnight Castle)	Takeshi Shibata	35.0%
7	February 18, 1996	"Tsuma no Himitsu" (妻の秘密, A Wife's Secret)	Rintarō Mayuzumi	33.7%
8	February 25, 1996	"Shiranu Kao no Hanbei" (知らぬ顔の半兵衛, The Unknown Face of Hanbei)	Mikio Satō	33.2%
9	March 3, 1996	"Saru no Kakuran" (猿のかく乱, The Monkey's Disturbance)	Takeshi Shibata	32.0%
10	March 10, 1996	"Uwaki Itashi-sōrō" (浮気いたし候, An Affair)	Rintarō Mayuzumi	37.4%
11	March 17, 1996	"Zettai Zetsumei" (絶体絶命, Absolute Desperation)	Mikio Satō	34.7%
12	March 24, 1996	"Hieizan Yakiuchi" (比叡山焼き打ち, The Burning of Mount Hiei)	Takeshi Shibata	31.2%
13	March 31, 1996	"Gokuhi Jōhō" (極秘情報, Confidential Information)	Rintarō Mayuzumi	30.7%
14	April 7, 1996	"Odani Rakujō" (小谷落城, The Fall of Otani Castle)	Mikio Satō	28.4%
15	April 14, 1996	"Dokuro no Sakazuki" (どくろの盃, The Skull Cup)	Takeshi Shibata	32.7%
16	April 21, 1996	"Kakushigo Hakkaku!" (隠し子発覚!, The Hidden Child is Found!)	Rintarō Mayuzumi	33.5%
17	April 28, 1996	"Kāchan to Hahagoze" (かあちゃんと母御前, Two Mothers)	Mikio Satō	28.0%
18	May 5, 1996	"Seppuku Meirei" (切腹命令, The Fate of Seppuku)	Takeshi Shibata	29.4%
19	May 12, 1996	"Chichi no Iede" (父の家出, Father's Runaway)	Rintarō Mayuzumi	31.7%
20	May 19, 1996	"Gunshi no Jōken" (軍師の条件, The Strategist's Requirements)	Kenji Shindō	32.4%
21	May 26, 1996	"Inochi no Omosa" (命の重さ, The Weight of Life)	Takeshi Shibata	31.2%
22	June 2, 1996	"Hahagoze, Haritsuke" (母御前、はりつけ, Mother's Crucifixion)	Rintarō Mayuzumi	30.6%
23	June 9, 1996	"Hanbei no Shi" (半兵衛の死, Hanbei's Death)	Mikio Satō	36.2%
24	June 16, 1996	"Sasen Sunzen" (左遷寸前, On the Edge of Demotion)	Takeshi Shibata	32.8%
25	June 23, 1996	"Onsen ni Ikitaku-sōrō" (温泉に行きたく候, Going to the Hot Springs)	Keishi Ōtomo	33.9%
26	June 30, 1996	"Shijō-saidai no Oseibo" (史上最大のお歳暮, The Largest Year-End Gift in History)	Kenji Shindō	33.2%
27	July 7, 1996	"Mitsunari Tōjō" (三成登場, Mitsunari's Arrival)	Mikio Satō	31.3%
28	July 14, 1996	"Takamatsu-jō Mizu-zeme" (高松城水攻め, Water-Siege at Takamatsu Castle)	Takeshi Shibata	33.5%
29	July 21, 1996	"Teki wa Honnō-ji" (敵は本能寺, The Enemy is Honno-ji)	Rintarō Mayuzumi	31.2%
30	July 28, 1996	"Nobunaga, Shisu" (信長、死す, Nobunaga's Death)	Mikio Satō	26.4%
31	August 11, 1996	"Tenka eno Michi" (天下への道, The Path to the Realm)	Takeshi Shibata	26.8%
32	August 18, 1996	"Yume wo Tsugu Mono" (夢を継ぐ者, Inheriting the Dream)	Yoshiharu Katō	29.7%
33	August 25, 1996	"Mitsuhide no Kubi" (光秀の首, Mitsuhide's Head)	Rintarō Mayuzumi	29.9%
34	September 1, 1996	"Onna no Tenka-tori" (女の天下獲り, Woman's Conquest of the Realm)	Mikio Satō	31.8%
35	September 8, 1996	"Utsukushiki Shikaku" (美しき刺客, Beautiful Assassin)	Takeshi Shibata	33.1%
36	September 15, 1996	"Ieyasu vs. Hideyoshi" (家康VS秀吉)	Taku Katō	29.5%
37	September 22, 1996	"Tenshi-sama no Gorakuin!?" (天子様の御落胤!?, The Ruler's Mischief)	Rintarō Mayuzumi	31.8%
38	September 29, 1996	"Ōgon no Chashitsu" (黄金の茶室, The Golden Tea Room)	Taku Katō	23.9%
39	October 6, 1996	"Kāchan, Hitojichi" (かあちゃん、人質, Mother, Hostage)	Mikio Satō	22.2%
40	October 13, 1996	"Yūwaku" (誘惑, Temptation)	Yuki Nakashima	27.9%
41	October 27, 1996	"Ketsubetsu no Asagao" (決別の朝顔, The Parting Morning Glories)	Rintarō Mayuzumi	29.1%
42	November 3, 1996	"Yodo no Ko, Tanjō" (淀の子、誕生, The Birth of Yodo's Child)	Takeshi Shibata	25.0%
43	November 10, 1996	"Hana-ikusa de Gozaru" (花戦さでござる, Flower Battle)	Keishi Ōtomo	27.2%
44	November 17, 1996	"Hidenaga, Iku" (秀長、逝く, Hidenaga's Death)	Mikio Satō	29.1%
45	November 24, 1996	"Rikyū Seppuku" (利休切腹, Rikyu Disembowels Himself)	Rintarō Mayuzumi	30.0%
46	December 1, 1996	"Haha no Kanashimi" (母の悲しみ, A Mother's Lament)	Mikio Satō	30.5%
47	December 8, 1996	"Kāchan no Shi!" (かあちゃんの死!, Mother's Death)	Takeshi Shibata	25.9%
48	December 15, 1996	"Goemon, Kama-yude" (五右衛門、釜ゆで, Goemon, Boiled Alive)	Mikio Satō	27.3%
49	December 22, 1996	"Yume no mata Yume" (夢のまた夢, A Dream with a Dream)	Rintarō Mayuzumi	27.1%
Average rating 30.5% - Rating is based on Japanese Video Research (Kantō region).

== Broadcasting in the United States ==
Circa 1997–98, New Jersey Network would air the show subtitled in English on Sunday evenings at 11:00pm EST. However, there is no physical domestic release of this series on VHS or DVD.
