= Isaniwa Yukiya =

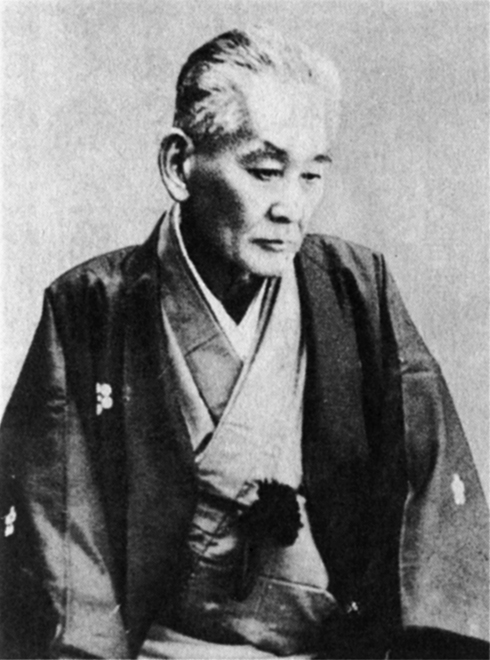
Isaniwa Yukiya.

Isaniwa Yukiya (伊佐庭如矢, Isaniwa Yukiya) (1828–1907) was the first mayor of Dogo Yunomachi (道後湯之町) which is famous for Dōgo Onsen. He made today's Dōgo Onsen while he was the mayor. He thought the tourism era would come in the future, so he made a plan to make the city into a resort city.

== Early life and education ==
Narukawa Yukiya was born in 1828 to Narukawa Kunio, a Dogo physician, and his wife, Maki. Yukiya liked studying. He was taught by Mikami Zean, a doctor in Matsuyama-han, which was the name of the area surrounding Matsuyama prior to 1868. In 1845, when he was adopted by Abe Yasuo, a low-level samurai, he became Abe Yukiya, and in 1848, he married Yasuo's daughter, Isa. In 1855, Abe Yukiya founded "Rōbai Gejuku," a private school. In 1868 when the Japanese period changed to the Meiji era, Abe Yukiya already had three children: Onoe (first son), Ran (first daughter), and Momoyo (second daughter). When his eldest son, Onoe, reached adulthood, Yukiya established him as the head of the household. Then, Yukiya himself left the Abe family and took the name of Isaniwa Yukiya.

As Matsuyama was reorganized during the abolition of the han system, Isaniwa Yukiya began working in a city office of Matsuyama-han in 1870 and in 1873, and then he worked in a city office in some prefectures in Shikoku between 1877 and 1886. He was appointed as Dōgo Yunomachi’s first mayor in 1890. He did this job for 12 years.

== Dogo Yunomachi before Yukiya ==
Dogo Yunomachi means the hot spring town of Dogo. The spring had good quality and visiting it was cheap, so it was popular among the people of the town. Because the flow of hot spring water was small, it couldn't be divided and brought to hotels. Since about 1603, the hot spring had been divided into three hot spring rooms and a free outdoor hot spring for cures. Those two springs supported Dogo Yunomachi. However, both of them were quite old and needed to be renewed.

== Yukiya's achievements as mayor ==
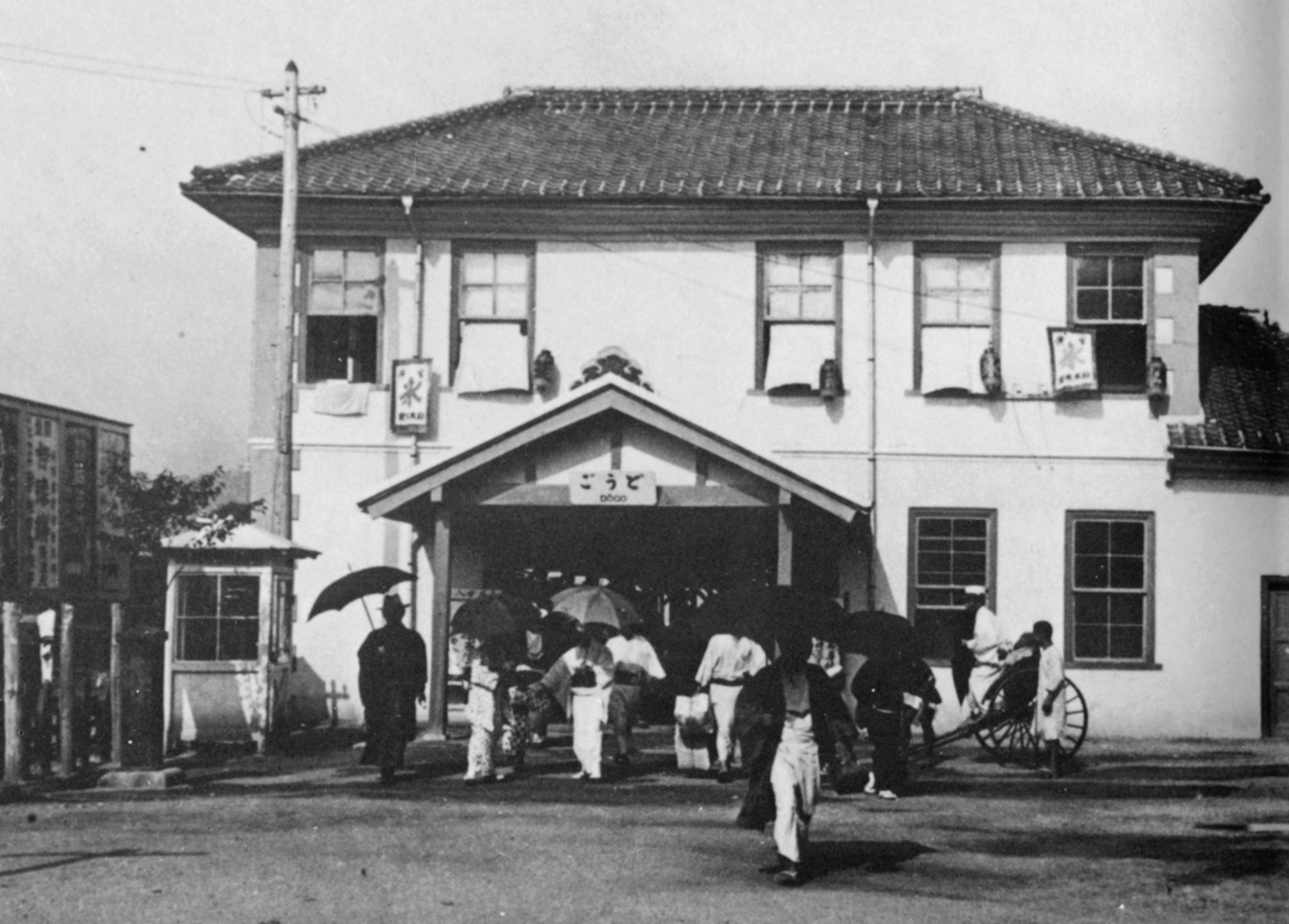
Dōgo Onsen Station in 1895.

During the two years that Isaniwa Yukiya served as a mayor, he changed many things. First, he began charging money for a previously free outdoor hot spring for cures(Where?), because the hot spring was old and needed to be renewed. Then he rebuilt the hot spring for cures in 1892. And then he planned to renew the main hot spring. Yukiya planned Dōgo Onsen to have a third floor which was rare in those days for Japan, Japanese style mixed with European style building, red and blue Giyaman glass (Dutch style glass) used and looks rich and powerful building, because the main hot spring had good quality, Yukiya didn't want to Dōgo Onsen looks usual type of other buildings. He asked Sakamoto Hachiro, a carpenter for castle, to make it and Sakamoto built it in 1894. It took for 20 months to build. In 1895 he founded the Dogo Train Corporation (later merged into Iyotetsu in 1900) and asked to make the train rail to Dogo through Ichiban-cho in 1897, because Yukiya thought Dōgo Onsen Station would encourage people to come and visit Dogo Yunomachi. And in the same year, he made the park around the Dōgo Onsen(Which?), and for people to enjoy sweets he made red and white Yuzarashi Dango, known today as Botchan Dango. However, most people of the city disagreed with his these ideas until they saw the new Dōgo Onsen.

== Disagreement ==
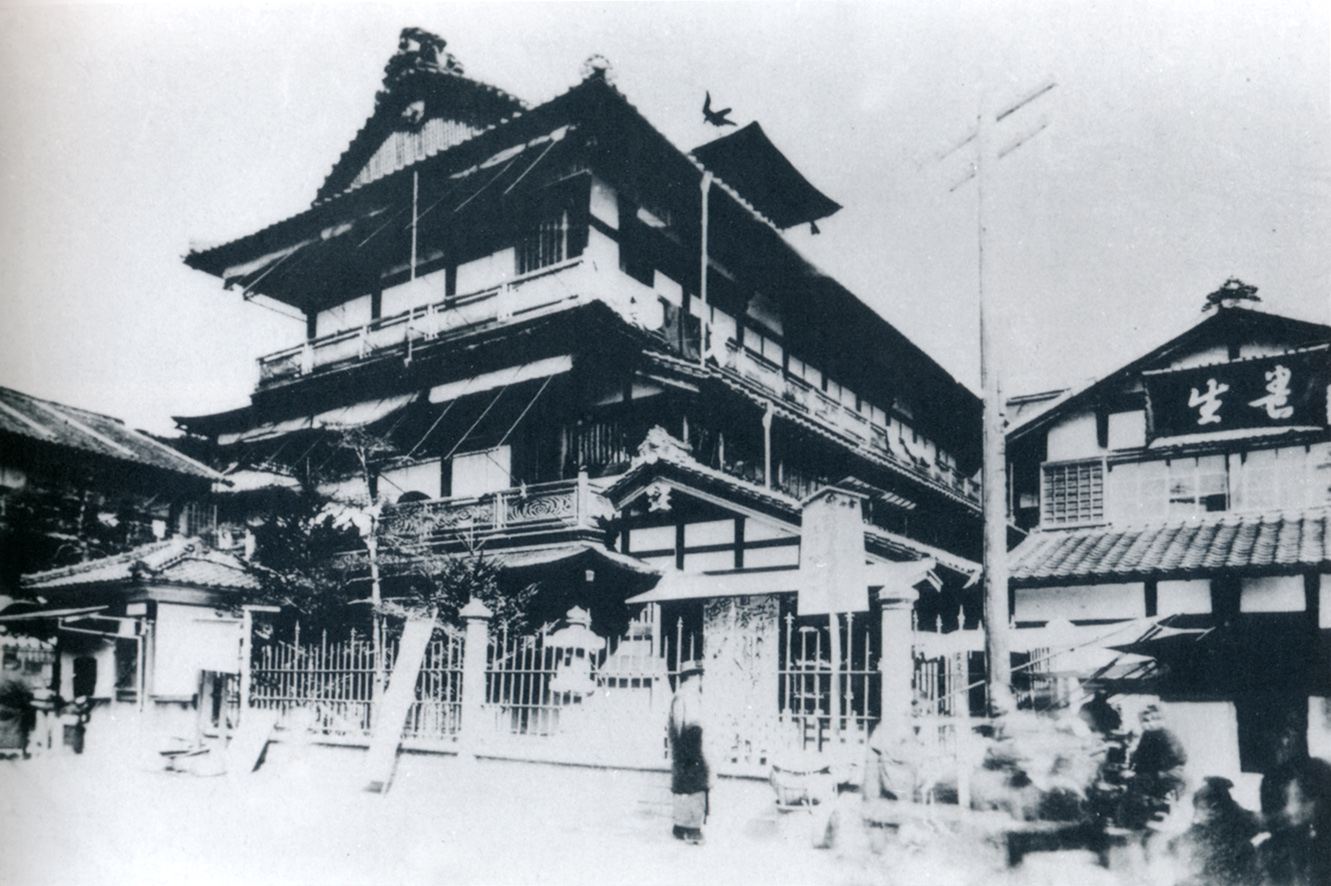
Dōgo Onsen in 1894.

First, when Yukiya charged money for the outdoor hot spring for cures, many people disagreed with the idea, because if people of Dogo Yunomachi were charged for the hot spring, Dogo hotels' business would suffer. But Yukiya needed money to renew it, so he ignored them. Second, people objected to paying money for the construction. Yukiya has been quoted as saying, "Dōgo Onsen should be a fabulous building, to make people to visit", "It is now hard for us, but this experience will change this city in the future and it will be a great city," and "this plan is not rash!" After contending with their disagreement and explaining his ideas many times, the people of the city changed their idea and helped him.

== Today's Dōgo Onsen ==
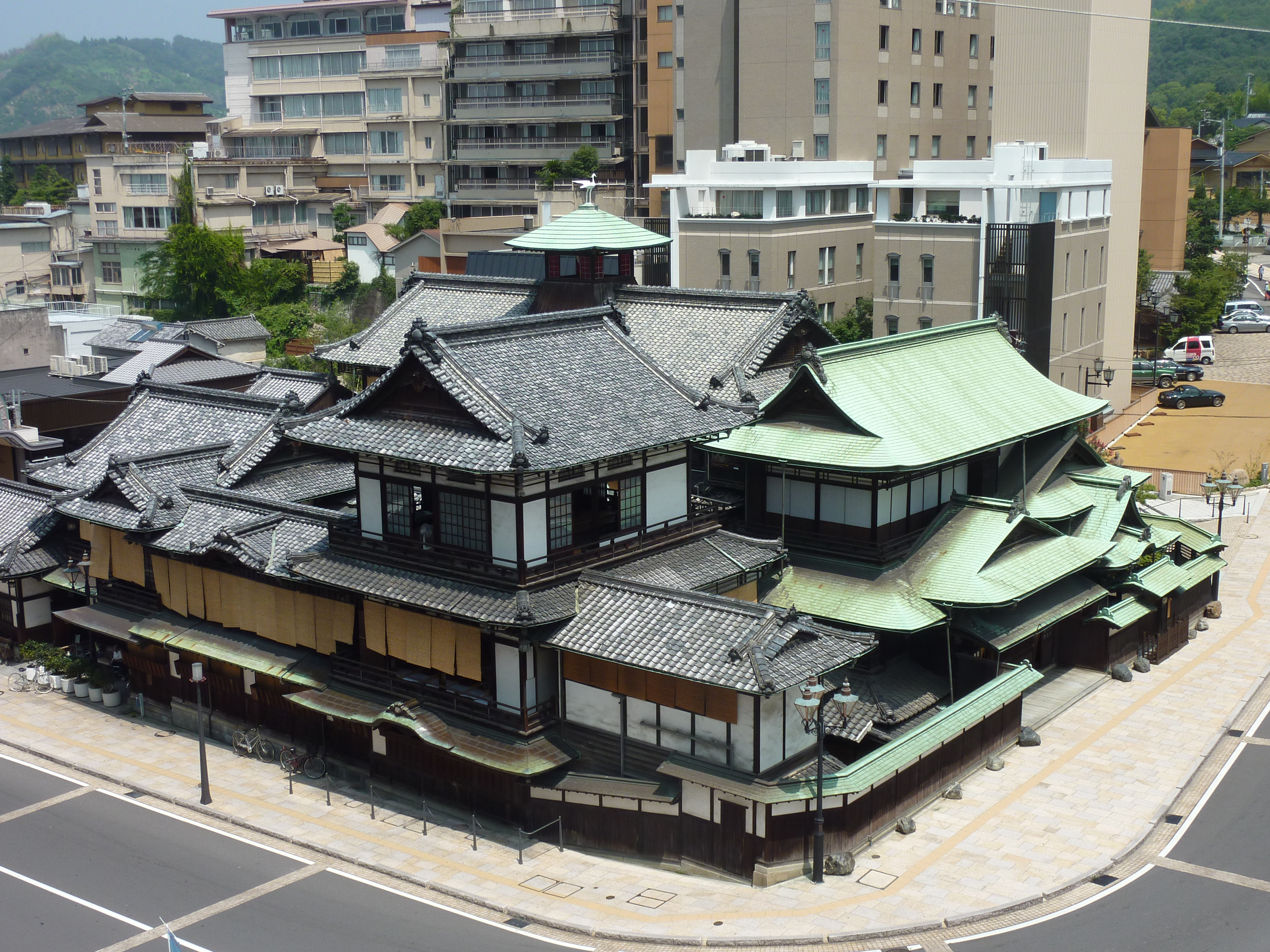
Dōgo Onsen in 2009.

Isaniwa Yukiya ended his job as mayor in 1902. He died in 1907. Today, Dōgo Onsen has become famous and many people visit on tours. Dōgo Onsen is one of the most recognizable landmarks in Matsuyama City today.
