= The Sea and Poison =

1957 novel by Shusaku Endu

- Author: Shūsaku Endō
- Translator: Michael Gallagher
- Language: Japanese
- Genre: Novel
- Publisher: Bungei Shunju
- Publication date: 1957
- Publication place: Japan
- ISBN: 0720616859

The Sea and Poison (Japanese: 海と毒薬) is a 1957 Japanese short novel written by Shūsaku Endō.

== Plot ==
The story is set in Fukuoka hospital during the late stages of World War II, when Japan is demoralized by constant air raids. The intern Dr. Suguro participated in a series of medical experiments designed by an ambitious senior surgeon, Hashimoto, involving vivisection of captured American airmen. Formally, the purpose of the experiments are to determine how much lung tissue can be removed before the patient dies, and how much saline and air can be injected into the blood before death occurs, both are crucial knowledge in the treatment of tuberculosis, a disease currently ravaging the country. However, the real motivation of these experiments arises from military brutality, competition among hospital department heads, and an atmosphere of nihilism in the face of closing defeat.

== Adaptations ==
The novel was adapted into a film of the same name in 1986 by Kei Kumai.
