= List of accolades received by Silence (2016 film) =

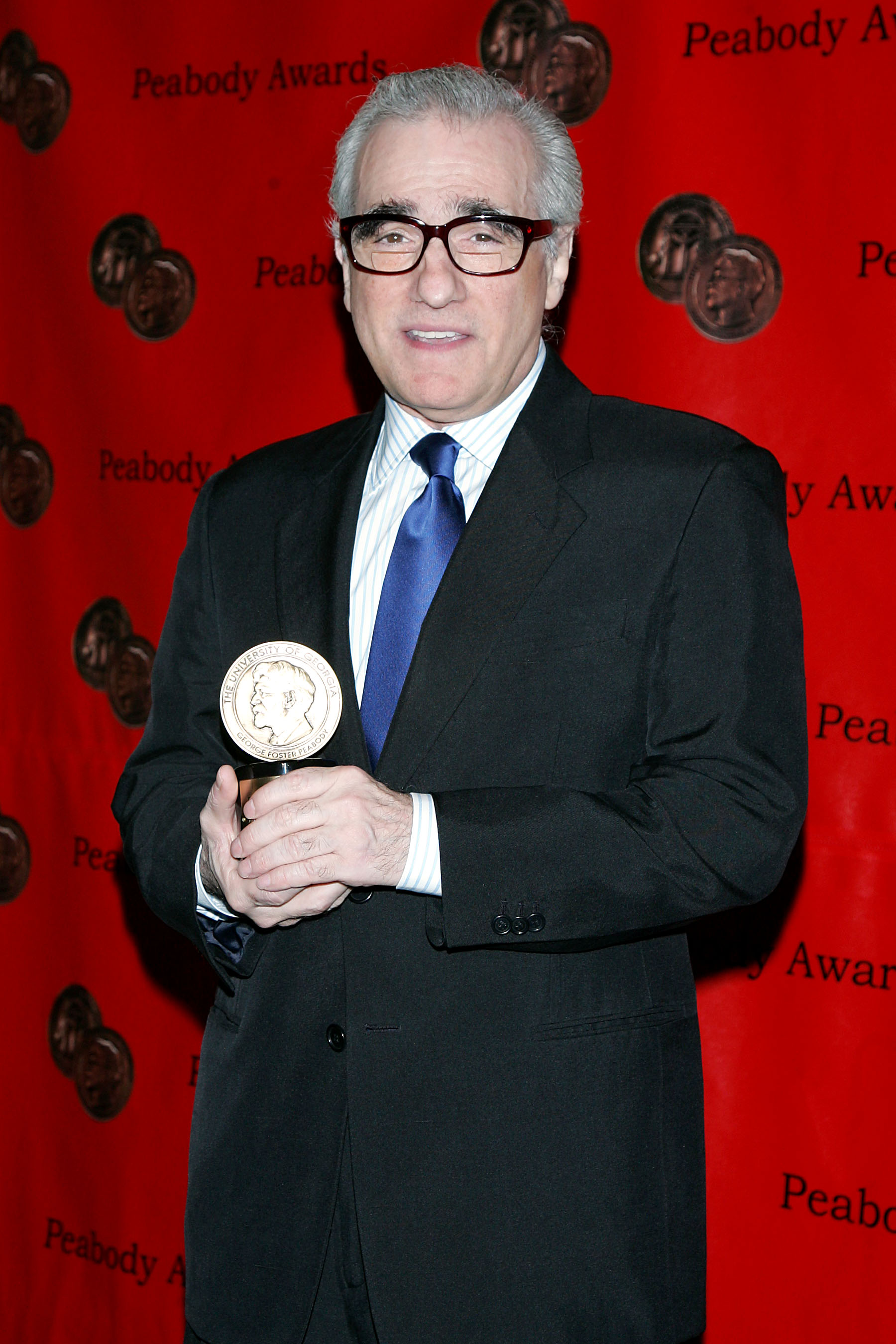
Director Martin Scorsese at the 65th Peabody Awards in 2006

Silence is a 2016 period drama film directed by Martin Scorsese and written by Jay Cocks and Scorsese, based on the 1966 novel of the same name by Shūsaku Endō. Set in Nagasaki, Japan, the film was shot entirely in Taiwan around Taipei. The film stars Andrew Garfield, Adam Driver, Liam Neeson, Tadanobu Asano, and Ciarán Hinds. The plot follows two 17th century Jesuit priests who travel from Portugal to Japan to locate their missing mentor, Cristóvão Ferreira, and spread Catholic Christianity. The story is set in the time of Kakure Kirishitan ("Hidden Christians"), following the suppression of the Shimabara Rebellion (1637–1638) of Japanese Roman Catholics against the Tokugawa shogunate.

A long-time passion project for Scorsese, which he developed for over 25 years, the film premiered at the Pontifical Oriental Institute in Rome on November 29, 2016, and was released in the United States on December 23, 2016. The American Film Institute and National Board of Review both selected Silence as one of their top ten films of the year. The film also received an Academy Award nomination for Best Cinematography at the 89th Academy Awards.

Silence is the last of Scorsese's trilogy of film epics about religious figures struggling with challenges to faith, following The Last Temptation of Christ (1988) and Kundun (1997).

== Top ten lists ==
Silence was listed on numerous critics' top ten lists.

- 1st – Justin Chang, Los Angeles Times
- 1st – Rene Rodriguez, Miami Herald
- 1st – Sean Mulvihill, FanboyNation
- 2nd – Joshua Rothkopf, Time Out New York
- 2nd – Glenn Kenny, RogerEbert.com
- 3rd – Mark Olsen, Los Angeles Times
- 3rd – Scott Tobias, The Village Voice
- 4th – Ben Kenigsberg and Scout Tafoya, RogerEbert.com
- 4th – William Bibbiani, CraveOnline
- 4th – Chris Cabin and Brian Formo, Collider
- 5th – Peter Travers, Rolling Stone
- 5th – Stephanie Zacharek, Time
- 5th – Patrick McGavin and Brian Tallerico, RogerEbert.com
- 5th – Bilge Ebiri, LA Weekly
- 6th – Katie Rife, The A.V. Club
- 7th – Keith Phipps, Uproxx
- 8th – Alissa Wilkinson, Vox
- 8th – Aubrey Page, Collider
- 8th – Witney Seibold, CraveOnline
- 9th – Todd McCarthy, The Hollywood Reporter
- 9th – Richard Roeper, Chicago Sun-Times
- 9th – Ignatiy Vishnevetsky, The A.V. Club
- 10th – Peter Sobczynski, RogerEbert.com
- Top 10 (listed alphabetically, not ranked) – Walter Addiego, San Francisco Chronicle
- Top 10 (listed alphabetically, not ranked) – Stephen Whitty, The Star-Ledger

== Accolades ==
In addition to competitive awards for which the film received accolades, the American Film Institute and National Board of Review both selected Silence as one of their top ten films of the year.

Award	Date of ceremony	Category	Recipient(s) and nominee(s)	Result	Ref.
AARP Annual Movies for Grownups Awards	February 6, 2017	Best Picture	Silence	Nominated	
AARP Annual Movies for Grownups Awards	February 6, 2017	Best Director	Martin Scorsese	Nominated	
AARP Annual Movies for Grownups Awards	February 6, 2017	Best Screenwriter	Jay Cocks and Martin Scorsese	Nominated	
AARP Annual Movies for Grownups Awards	February 6, 2017	Best Supporting Actor	Issey Ogata	Nominated	
Academy Awards	February 26, 2017	Best Cinematography	Rodrigo Prieto	Nominated	
American Society of Cinematographers	February 4, 2017	Outstanding Achievement in Cinematography in Theatrical Releases	Rodrigo Prieto	Nominated	
Chicago Film Critics Association	December 15, 2016	Best Adapted Screenplay	Jay Cocks and Martin Scorsese	Nominated	
Chicago Film Critics Association	December 15, 2016	Best Cinematography	Rodrigo Prieto	Nominated	
IndieWire Critics Poll	December 19, 2016	Best Director	Martin Scorsese	10th place	
London Film Critics' Circle	January 22, 2017	British Actor of the Year	Andrew Garfield (also for Hacksaw Ridge)	Won	
Los Angeles Film Critics Association	December 4, 2016	Best Supporting Actor	Issey Ogata	Runner-up	
National Board of Review	November 29, 2016	Best Adapted Screenplay	Jay Cocks and Martin Scorsese	Won	
National Society of Film Critics	January 7, 2017	Best Cinematography	Rodrigo Prieto	3rd Place	
San Francisco Bay Area Film Critics Circle	December 11, 2016	Best Cinematography	Rodrigo Prieto	Nominated	
Visual Effects Society Awards	February 7, 2017	Outstanding Supporting Visual Effects in a Photoreal Feature	Brian Barlettani, Ivan Busquets, Juan Jesús García, Pablo Helman, and R. Bruce Steinheimer	Nominated	

== See also ==
- Silence (1971 film), an earlier version directed by Masahiro Shinoda
