= Giuseppe Chiara =

Italian Jesuit missionary active in 17th century Japan

Giuseppe Chiara (1602 – 24 August 1685) was an Italian Jesuit missionary active in 17th century Japan.

Chiara was born in Palermo, Kingdom of Sicily. He entered Japan at a time when Christianity was strictly forbidden, in an attempt to locate fellow priest Cristóvão Ferreira who had apostatized his Christian faith due to torture by Japanese authorities in 1633.

After the Shimabara Rebellion in 1638, Chiara arrived on the island of Oshima, but was arrested in June 1643 and then incarcerated at a prison named Kirishitan Yashiki (Japanese: 吉利支丹屋敷, Christian Residence) in Edo. He also was tortured and eventually became an apostate as well. He later married a Japanese woman, taking the name of her late husband, Okamoto San'emon (Japanese: 岡本三右衛門), and lived in Japan until his death on 24 August 1685 in Edo, at the age of 83. His remains were cremated.

== In popular culture ==
Chiara was the historical basis for the lead character of Sebastião Rodrigues in the novel Silence by Shūsaku Endō. He was portrayed by David Lampson in the 1971 film version and by Andrew Garfield in the 2016 film version.
