= Chijiwa =

Chijiwa may refer to:

- Chijiwa, Nagasaki, a former town in Nagasaki Prefecture, Japan
- Miguel Chijiwa (c. 1569–1633), Japanese delegate and Christian convert
