= Gessel =

Gessel is a surname of South German origin. Notable people with the surname include:

- Ira Gessel (born 1951), American mathematician
- Van C. Gessel (born 1950), American academic administrator
- Sander van Gessel (born 1976), Dutch footballer
