= Os Olhos da Ásia =

1996 film by João Mário Grilo

- Directed by: João Mário Grilo
- Screenplay by: João Mário Grilo; Paulo Filipe
- Based on: Silence by Shūsaku Endō
- Produced by: Paulo Branco; Toru Aisawa
- Starring: Geraldine Chaplin; João Perry
- Cinematography: Jean-Paul Rosa da Costa
- Edited by: Christian Dior
- Music by: Jorge Arriagada
- Release date: 15 August 1996 (Locarno)
- Running time: 86 minutes
- Countries: Portugal; France; Germany
- Languages: Portuguese; Japanese

Os Olhos da Ásia (Portuguese: The Eyes of Asia) is a 1996 Portuguese historical drama film directed by João Mário Grilo, who also co-wrote the script with Paulo Filipe. It is partially based on the novel Silence by Shūsaku Endō. The film premiered at the Locarno International Film Festival on 15 August 1996 where it was also nominated for the Golden Leopard. The film was released in Portugal on 11 April 1997.

== Plot ==
Nakaura of Julian (Julião Nakaura), a priest of the Society of Jesus, was one of four young ambassadors sent to Rome by the Jesuits in 1538, as proof that Japan had converted to Christianity. Fifty years after the mission, which so fascinated European royalty, Julian was forced again to prove his faith, only this time before a shōgun, who wanted to force him to abandon his religion. Julian resists, as does Miguel Chijiwa, a fellow at the embassy to Rome, who become a martyr. Betrayed by Cristóvão Ferreira, who cannot bear the torture, Julian suffers an inglorious death ... or maybe not.

== Cast ==
- Geraldine Chaplin as Jane Powell
- João Perry as Cristóvão Ferreira
- António Cordeiro as Mateus
- Marques D'Arede as Giovanni Adami
- José Eduardo as Lucas do Espírito Santo
- Rui Gomes as Sebastião
- Kyioto Harada as Matazaemon
- Edward Ishita as Edward Ishita
- Yuzi Kosugi as Kurobei
- Carlos Martins Medeiros as António de Souza
- Yoshi Oida as Julião Nakaura
- Itaru Takahara as Sr. Takahara
- Yasukiyo Umeno as Miguel
- Diogo Vasconcelos as Orlando

== See also ==
- Silence (1971 film) – Japanese film adaptation of Shūsaku Endō's novel, directed by Masahiro Shinoda.
- Silence (2016 film) – American film adaptation of the novel, directed by Martin Scorsese
