= Silence (Endō novel) =

1966 novel by Shusaku Endo

- English cover
- Author: Shūsaku Endō
- Original title: Chinmoku
- Translator: William Johnston
- Language: Japanese
- Genre: Historical fiction
- Publisher: Shinchosha
- Publication date: 1966
- Publication place: Japan
- English publication date: 1969
- Media type: Print

Silence (Japanese: 沈黙, Hepburn: Chinmoku) is a 1966 novel of theological and historical fiction by Japanese author Shūsaku Endō. It tells the story of a Jesuit missionary sent to 17th-century Japan, who endures persecution in the time of Kakure Kirishitan ('Hidden Christians') that followed the defeat of the Shimabara Rebellion. The recipient of the 1966 Tanizaki Prize, it has been called "Endō's supreme achievement" and "one of the twentieth century's finest novels". Written partly in the form of a letter by its central character, the theme of a silent God who accompanies a believer in adversity was greatly influenced by the Catholic Endō's experience of religious discrimination in Japan, culture gap in France, and a debilitating bout with tuberculosis.

Silence was published in English in 1969 by Peter Owen Publishers. The novel has been adapted to film three times, a 1971 Japanese film directed by Masahiro Shinoda (for which Endō co-wrote the screenplay), a 1996 Portuguese film directed by João Mário Grilo, and a 2016 American film directed by Martin Scorsese.

== Plot summary ==
The young Portuguese Jesuit priest Sebastião Rodrigues (based on the historical Italian figure Giuseppe Chiara) travels to Japan to assist the local Church and investigate reports that his mentor, a Jesuit priest in Japan named Ferreira, based on Cristóvão Ferreira, has committed apostasy. Less than half of the book is the written journal of Rodrigues, while the other half of the book is written either in the third person, or in the letters of others associated with the narrative. The novel relates the trials of Christians and the increasing hardship suffered by Rodrigues.

Rodrigues and his fellow Jesuit priest Francisco Garupe arrive in Japan in 1639. There they find the local Christian population driven underground. To ferret out hidden Christians, security officials force suspected Christians to trample on a fumi-e, a carved image of Christ. Those who refuse are imprisoned and killed by ana-tsurushi, which is by being hung upside down over a pit and slowly bled.

Rodrigues and Garupe are eventually captured and forced to swim as Japanese Christians lay down their lives for the faith. There is no glory in these martyrdoms, as Rodrigues had always imagined – only brutality and cruelty. Prior to the arrival of Rodrigues, the authorities had been attempting to force priests to renounce their faith by torturing them. Beginning with Ferreira, they torture other Christians as the priests look on, telling the priests that all they must do is renounce their faith in order to end the suffering of their flock.

Rodrigues's journal depicts his struggles: he understands suffering for the sake of one's own faith, but he struggles over whether it is self-centered and unmerciful to refuse to recant when doing so will end another's suffering. At the climactic moment, Rodrigues hears the moans of those who have recanted but are to remain in the pit until he tramples the image of Christ. As Rodrigues looks upon a fumi-e, a voice which seems to be Christ breaks his silence: "You may trample. You may trample. I more than anyone know of the pain in your foot. You may trample. It was to be trampled on by men that I was born into this world. It was to share men's pain that I carried my cross." Rodrigues puts his foot on the fumi-e.

An official tells Rodrigues, "Father, it was not by us that you were defeated, but by this mudswamp, Japan."

== Reception ==
Silence received the 1966 Tanizaki Prize for the year's best full-length literature. It has also been the subject of extensive analysis. In a review published by The New Yorker, John Updike called Silence "a remarkable work, a sombre, delicate, and startlingly empathetic study of a young Portuguese missionary during the relentless persecution of the Japanese Christians in the early seventeenth century." William Cavanaugh highlights the novel's "deep moral ambiguity" due to the depiction of a God who "has chosen not to eliminate suffering, but to suffer with humanity."

Silence was not immediately successful among Japanese Catholics, who were among some of the novel's harshest critics. Instead, the novel's popularity was boosted by "left-wing college students" who saw a connection to the plight of Japanese Marxists in the circumstances of Rodrigues. The novel was notably compared to Graham Greene's The Power and the Glory, leading Endo to be referred to as "the Graham Greene of Japan."

== Adaptations ==
=== Stage ===
Besides Endo's stage version, The Golden Country, there have been several adaptations.

=== Films ===
Masahiro Shinoda directed the 1971 film Silence, an adaptation from the novel.

It was adapted by João Mário Grilo as Os Olhos da Ásia in 1996.

In 2016, the novel was adapted into a film, also named Silence, directed by Martin Scorsese, written by Jay Cocks and Scorsese, and starring Andrew Garfield, Adam Driver, Liam Neeson, Tadanobu Asano and Ciarán Hinds. The film premiered at the Pontifical Oriental Institute in Rome on November 29, 2016.

=== Music ===
Composer and poet Teizo Matsumura wrote the libretto and music for an opera with the same title, which was premiered at the New National Theatre Tokyo in 2000. The novel inspired Symphony no. 3, "Silence", composed in 2002 by Scottish musician James MacMillan.

== See also ==
- History of Roman Catholicism in Japan
- Urakami Cathedral
