= Van C. Gessel =

American academic

- Born: August 1, 1950 (age 76); Compton, California, United States
- Education: University of Utah (B.A.); Columbia University (Ph.D.)
- Occupations: Emeritus Professor of Japanese Literature, Translator
- Spouse: Elizabeth Gessel
- Children: 3

Academic work
- Institutions: Brigham Young University, Columbia University, University of Notre Dame, UC Berkeley

Van Craig Gessel (born August 1, 1950, Compton, California) is a former Dean of the BYU College of Humanities at Brigham Young University. He also served as chair of the Department of Asian and Near Eastern Languages at BYU. He has become renowned for his work as the primary translator for Japanese novelist Endo Shusaku. He is also a co-editor of several Japanese translations including The Columbia Anthology of Modern Japanese Literature (Volume 1 published in 2005, Volume 2 in 2007).

== Biography ==
Gessel is a graduate of the University of Utah from which he received a bachelor's degree and Columbia University from which he received a PhD in Japanese literature in 1979. He has taught as a faculty member at Columbia University, Notre Dame, UC Berkeley, and Brigham Young University. He has served as a bishop, stake president, and the president of the Portland, Oregon Mission (2005–2008) of the Church of Jesus Christ of Latter-day Saints. Gessel and his wife Elizabeth have three children. In 2016, Gessel received a rare commendation from the Foreign Minister of Japan for "outstanding contributions to mutual understanding and goodwill between Japan and other nations". On April 29, 2018, Gessel was honored by the Emperor of Japan with the Order of the Rising Sun for his outstanding work in Japanese literature, promoting mutual understanding between the United States and Japan. Gessel was awarded the Lindsley and Masao Miyoshi Translation Prize in 2020-2021 for lifetime achievement as a translator of modern Japanese fiction.

As the primary translator for novelist Endo Shusaku Gessel has translated nine novels/story collections from Japanese to English and consulted on the adaptation film by Martin Scorsese, Silence.

== Written works ==
- Japanese Fiction Writers Since WWII
- Three Modern Novelists
- The Sting of Life

== Translations ==
- When I Whistle (1974) by Endo Shusaku
- The Samurai (1980) by Endo Shusaku
- Scandal (1986) by Endo Shusaku
- Stained Glass Elegies (1990) by Endo Shusaku
- Deep River (1993) by Endo Shusaku
- The Final Martyrs (1993) by Endo Shusaku
- Five by Endo(2000) by Endo Shusaku
- Kiku's Prayer (2012) by Endo Shusaku
- Sachiko: A Novel (2020) by Endo Shusaku
- Portraits of a Mother (2025) by Endo Shusaku

== Edited works ==
- Taking the Gospel to the Japanese: 1901 to 2001, co-edited with Reid Neilson
- The Shōwa Anthology, co-edited with Tomone Matsumoto
- The Shōwa Anthology II, co-edited with Tomone Matsumoto
- The Columbia Anthology of Modern Japanese Literature (Volume 1 published in 2005, Volume 2 in 2007), co-edited with J. Thomas Rimer
- "Handbook of Japanese Christian Writers," co-edited with Mark Williams and Yamane Michihiro

== See also ==
- Shūsaku Endō
