= Scandal (Endō novel) =

1986 novel by Shūsaku Endō

- Author: Shūsaku Endō
- Original title: スキャンダル
- Language: Japanese
- English publication date: August 1, 1988

Scandal is a 1986 novel by Japanese author Shūsaku Endō. Endō was a Japanese Catholic writer whose works, among other things, covered various aspects of the Japanese Catholic experience. He was furthermore a member of the Japanese literary establishment, accounting for the importance of PEN meetings in the work. Aging in Japan was also addressed via commentary on the medical problems suffered by an elderly man.

== Plot summary ==
Set in Tokyo during the 1980s, it tells the story of a Catholic writer struggling with old age and the feeling that he yet has to write his magnum opus. One day, he attends a party at which a young woman appears and mentions loudly that he has not lately visited the ill-reputed street where she works as an artist. This tarnishes his reputation as a Christian writer with high moral standards, greatly embarrassing him and his publishers.

He meets Mitsu, a young girl who tells him about enjo kōsai ("compensated dating") and he decides to hire her as his mistress to relieve his rheumatic wife from sexual activity. As time passes he starts to dream about Mitsu but keeps silent about it so as not to worry his wife.

Reluctantly, he visits the studio of the woman from the party, where he meets an older woman whom he later befriends. He also starts to discover another world, including masochism and various fetish forms of prostitution. The people in that world all seem to know him and Suguro suspects that an impostor is out there, trying to destroy his reputation, and starts to hunt for this man.

Eventually the older woman, with whom he now has become rather close, sends him a letter inviting him to a love hotel where, she writes, the identity of the impostor will be revealed. Suguro finds the young Mitsu there, drunk and half-naked on the bed. Here, in the end of the book, it is revealed to him that a dark side exists below his polished surface.

== Critical analysis and reception ==
In Scandal, Endō creates a doppelganger of himself in Suguro, and forces Suguro to question his complacency and own sinful nature. According to Christos Tsiolkas, Scandal is a retelling of The Picture of Dorian Gray. Tsiolkas wrote "Endō is showing us what becomes of our humanity when we lie to ourselves and believe we have every right to throw the first stone."

Publishers Weekly gave a positive review, calling Scandal a "chilling, incisive study of the secret fears and obsessions of an aging writer...This provocative, impassioned meditation manages to explore not only the nature of identity, but also the regions of sin, salvation, art and religion, all with the unerring grace that defines a novelist in the fullest command of his craft." J. Thomas Rimer, writing for the Washington Post, likewise gave a positive review, calling the novel one of Endō's " most absorbing views to date of human spiritual darkness". Kirkus Reviews gave a critical review, writing "The surprisingly awkward narrative execution...means that this is unlikely to rank as one of the memorable treatments of duality." Charles Newman, writing for the New York Times criticized the writing style and themes of the novel and wrote that Scandal "can only finally invite a querulous incredulity."
