= The Samurai (novel) =

1980 novel by Shusaku Endo

- Author: Shusaku Endo
- Original title: 侍
- Language: Japanese
- Genre: Historical fiction
- Publication date: 1980
- Publication place: Japan

The Samurai is a novel by Japanese author Shusaku Endo first published in 1980. It tells a fictionalized story of a 17th-century diplomatic mission to "Nueva España" (New Spain or Mexico) by Japanese noblemen, and the cultural clash that ensues. It was translated by Van C. Gessel. The main character is Hasekura Rokuemon.

The book won the 33rd edition of the Noma Literary Prize.

== Plot summary ==
A samurai who serves as the "regent" of a series of villages is appointed, along with a Spanish priest named Velasco, to embark on a journey across the Pacific to negotiate a trade agreement with the Spanish in Mexico. There they travel from Acapulco, crossing the desert until they reach Mexico City, where they realize they cannot carry out their mission. To do so, they need to journey to Veracruz and board a ship bound for Spain. However, since the Spanish authorities show no interest in their mission, they must continue on to Rome, to seek an audience with the Pope Paul V at the Vatican. However, their mission proves to be in vain as they are unable to establish any contacts or agreements. They end up returning home, crossing Spain and then Mexico again, and crossing the Pacific once more before arriving in Japan, where they discover that the new leaders of the country are now actively persecuting Christians and do not wish to have any commercial contacts with other nations. The samurai Hasekura Rokuemon, who had traveled out of duty and not desire, ends up being ostracized.

== Reception ==
The Washington Post stated that it is "an intricate, fascinating tale".
