= Silence (2016 film) =

2016 film by Martin Scorsese

- Theatrical release poster
- Directed by: Martin Scorsese
- Screenplay by: Jay Cocks; Martin Scorsese
- Based on: Silence (1966 novel) by Shūsaku Endō
- Produced by: Martin Scorsese; Emma Tillinger Koskoff; Randall Emmett; Barbara De Fina; Gastón Pavlovich; Irwin Winkler; Vittorio Cecchi Gori
- Starring: Liam Neeson; Andrew Garfield; Adam Driver; Tadanobu Asano; Ciarán Hinds
- Cinematography: Rodrigo Prieto
- Edited by: Thelma Schoonmaker
- Music by: Kim Allen Kluge; Kathryn Kluge
- Production companies: Fábrica de Cine; AI Film; SharpSword Films; CatchPlay; IM Global; Verdi Productions; YLK; Sikelia Productions; The Fyzz Facility; Emmett/Furla/Oasis Films
- Distributed by: Paramount Pictures (Note: Distribution rights for Silence were split among multiple companies internationally. Paramount pictures handled distribution in the United States, while StudioCanal handled in the United Kingdom (U.K.), Gussi Cinema handled in Mexico, and CatchPlay Films handled in Taiwan.)
- Release dates: November 29, 2016 (Pontifical Oriental Institute, premiere); December 23, 2016 (U.S.); January 1, 2017 (U.K.)
- Running time: 161 minutes
- Countries: United States; United Kingdom; Mexico; Taiwan
- Languages: English; Japanese
- Budget: $40–50 million
- Box office: $24 million

Silence is a 2016 epic historical drama film directed by Martin Scorsese from a screenplay by Jay Cocks and Scorsese. It is based on the 1966 novel by Japanese author Shūsaku Endō, marking the third film adaptation of the novel. The film stars Liam Neeson, Andrew Garfield, Adam Driver, Tadanobu Asano, and Ciarán Hinds. The plot follows two 17th-century Jesuit priests who travel from Portugal to Edo period Japan via Macau to locate their missing mentor and spread Catholic Christianity. It is the third of Scorsese's films about religious figures struggling with challenges of faith, following The Last Temptation of Christ (1988) and Kundun (1997).

The pre-production phase of the filmmaking for Silence went through a cycle of over two decades of setbacks and reassessments. After filming of The Wolf of Wall Street concluded in January 2013, Scorsese committed to following it up with Silence. On April 19, 2013, Scorsese indicated that he would begin production on Silence in 2014. Irwin Winkler was then announced as a producer, as were Randall Emmett and George Furla, who would provide financing through their company Emmett/Furla Films. Soon thereafter, planning was made for the film to be shot in Taiwan.

A long-time passion project for Scorsese, which he had developed for over 25 years, Silence premiered in Rome on November 29, 2016, and was released in the United States on December 23, 2016. Though it received critical acclaim, being selected as one of the top ten films of the year by both the National Board of Review and the American Film Institute and being nominated for the Academy Award for Best Cinematography, it was a box office bomb, grossing $24 million against its $50 million budget.

== Plot ==
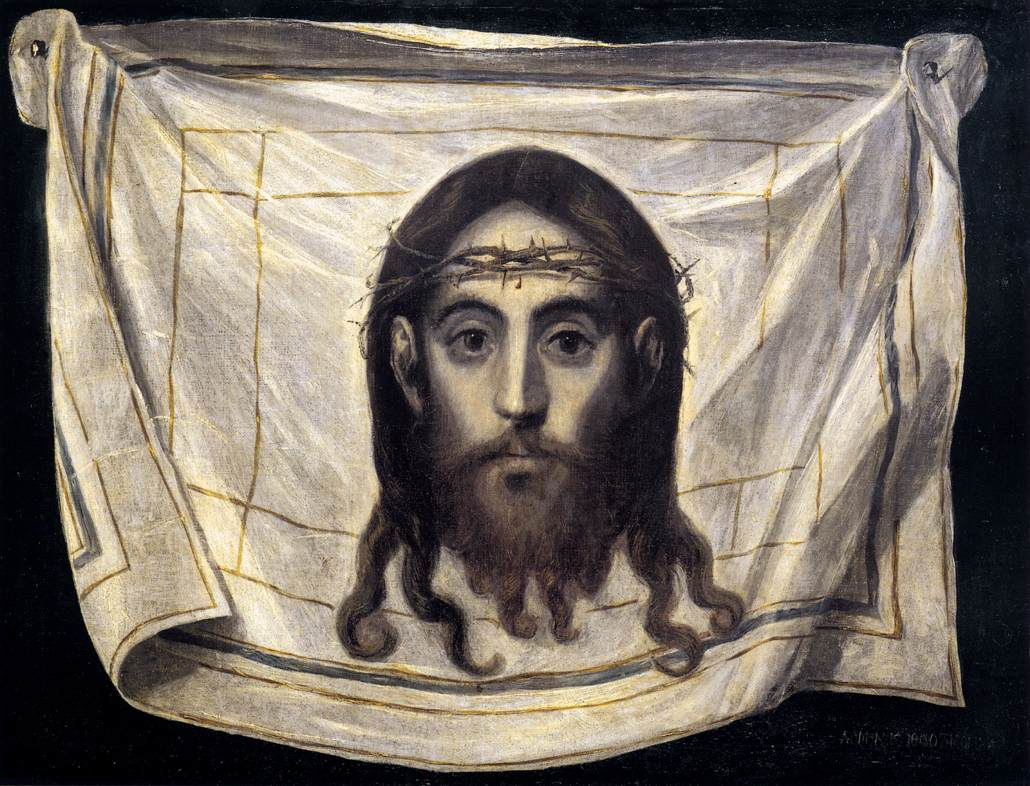
Rodrigues visualizes the face of Christ in the Veil of Veronica form painted by El Greco.

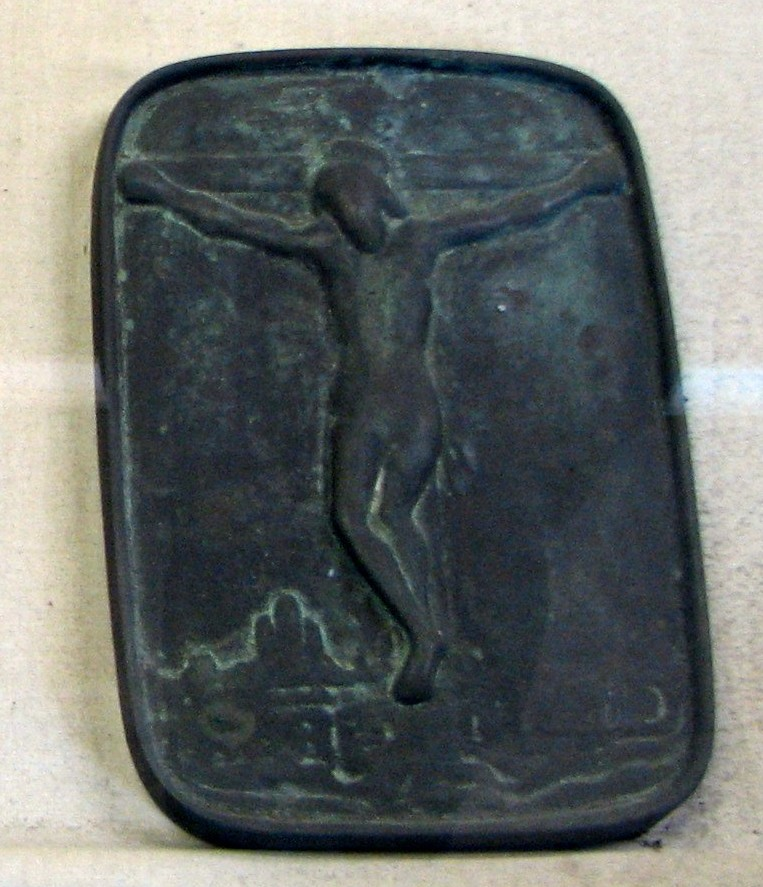
A fumi-e bearing an image of Christ, similar to the one portrayed in the film.

In 1633, in Japan, Jesuit priest Cristóvão Ferreira is forced to watch as several Catholic priests are tortured to death for refusing to renounce their faith.

In 1640, in Macau, the Jesuit Alessandro Valignano receives news that Ferreira has apostatized. In disbelief, Ferreira's Portuguese pupils, young Jesuit priests Sebastião Rodrigues and Francisco Garupe, set off to find him, guided by Kichijirō, a Japanese fisherman stranded in Macau who, although able to speak Portuguese, vehemently denies being Christian.

Arriving in a Japanese village called Tomogi, Rodrigues and Garupe find local Christians worshipping in secrecy in fear of "the Inquisitor." The villagers tell them that Kichijirō is actually a Christian who renounced his faith to save himself before the rest of his family were put to death by immolation; Rodrigues takes Kichijirō’s confession to grant him absolution.

When government officials arrive in the village to ferret out hidden Christians, they take four hostages, including Kichijirō, and force them to apostatize by stepping on a fumi-e, a carved image of Christ, which they all reluctantly do, and spitting on a cross, which only Kichijirō can force himself to do. The other three hostages are crucified on the shore and left to drown; their bodies are cremated so they cannot be given a Christian burial.

Garupe then leaves for Hirado Island and Rodrigues for Gotō Island, which is Kichijirō’s home. Kichijirō finds and hides Rodrigues, who again takes his confession, but then betrays Rodrigues to the authorities, who imprison him in Nagasaki with a number of Japanese Christians. After several of them refuse to step on a fumi-e, one of them is beheaded. When Kichijirō is imprisoned with them, Rodrigues reluctantly hears his confession again; Kichijirō is then released after he steps on the fumi-e.

Rodrigues is forced by the Inquisitor to watch as four Christians who have renounced their faith before the Inquisitor are drowned. He is shocked to see an emaciated Garupe with them; Garupe has been told he can save the condemned Christians by apostatizing, but he refuses to do so and instead swims out to try to save a drowning woman. The guards hold him underwater and he himself drowns. Rodrigues' faith in God is shaken.

Rodrigues is taken to meet Ferreira, who has assimilated into Japanese society. Ferreira, after being tortured, apostatized to save fellow Christians, and he now believes that Christianity has no place in Japan. He tells Rodrigues that he has been told to convince Rodrigues to abandon his faith. One night, Rodrigues is taken to watch five Christians being tortured. Ferreira tells him that they have already apostatized many times but that their torture will continue until Rodrigues also abandons his faith. Rodrigues hears what he believes is the voice of Jesus, giving him permission to step on the fumi-e, and he does.

Rodrigues works with Ferreira. The Inquisitor has tasked them with aiding him in his efforts to identify Christian images hidden in Japanese homes and to prevent Dutch traders from smuggling Christian paraphernalia into Japan. Rodrigues takes a Japanese name and wife.

Despite having already apostatized, Rodrigues is forced by government officials to give repeated vows of apostasy and to submit to periodic examinations. Kichijirō, now a servant to Rodrigues, again asks Rodrigues to hear his confession, and Rodrigues does so in secret after again hearing the voice of Jesus, who assures Rodrigues that he was not silent as Rodrigues thought, but also suffered for those who were killed. Kichijirō is taken away in 1667 after being caught wearing an amulet containing a Christian image.

Rodrigues lives out the remainder of his life in Japan. After his death, he is given a traditional Buddhist funeral. His wife is allowed to place an approved offering in his coffin to ward off evil spirits, but while doing so she also slips into his hand a tiny crudely made crucifix that was given to him when he first arrived in Tomogi.

== Cast ==
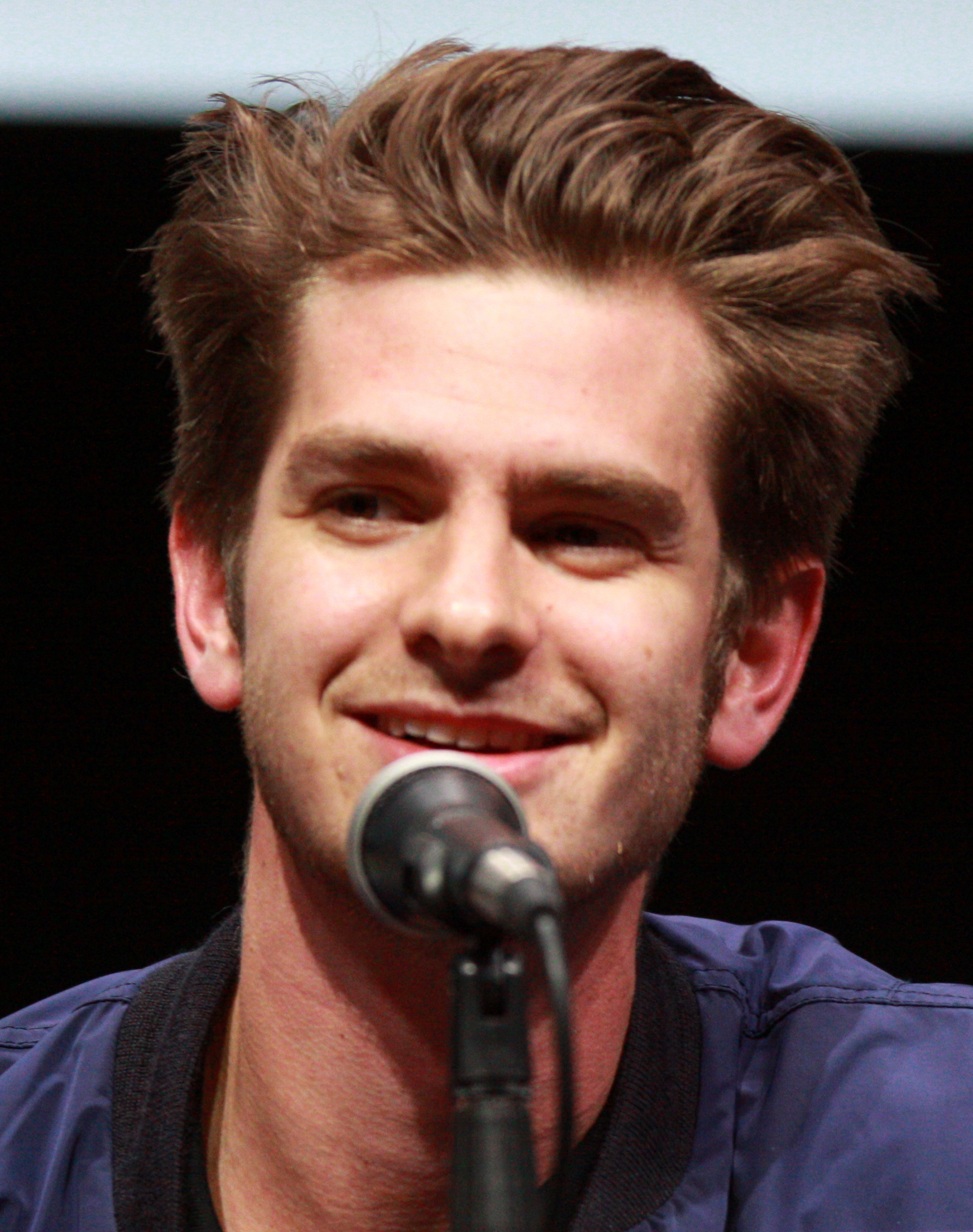
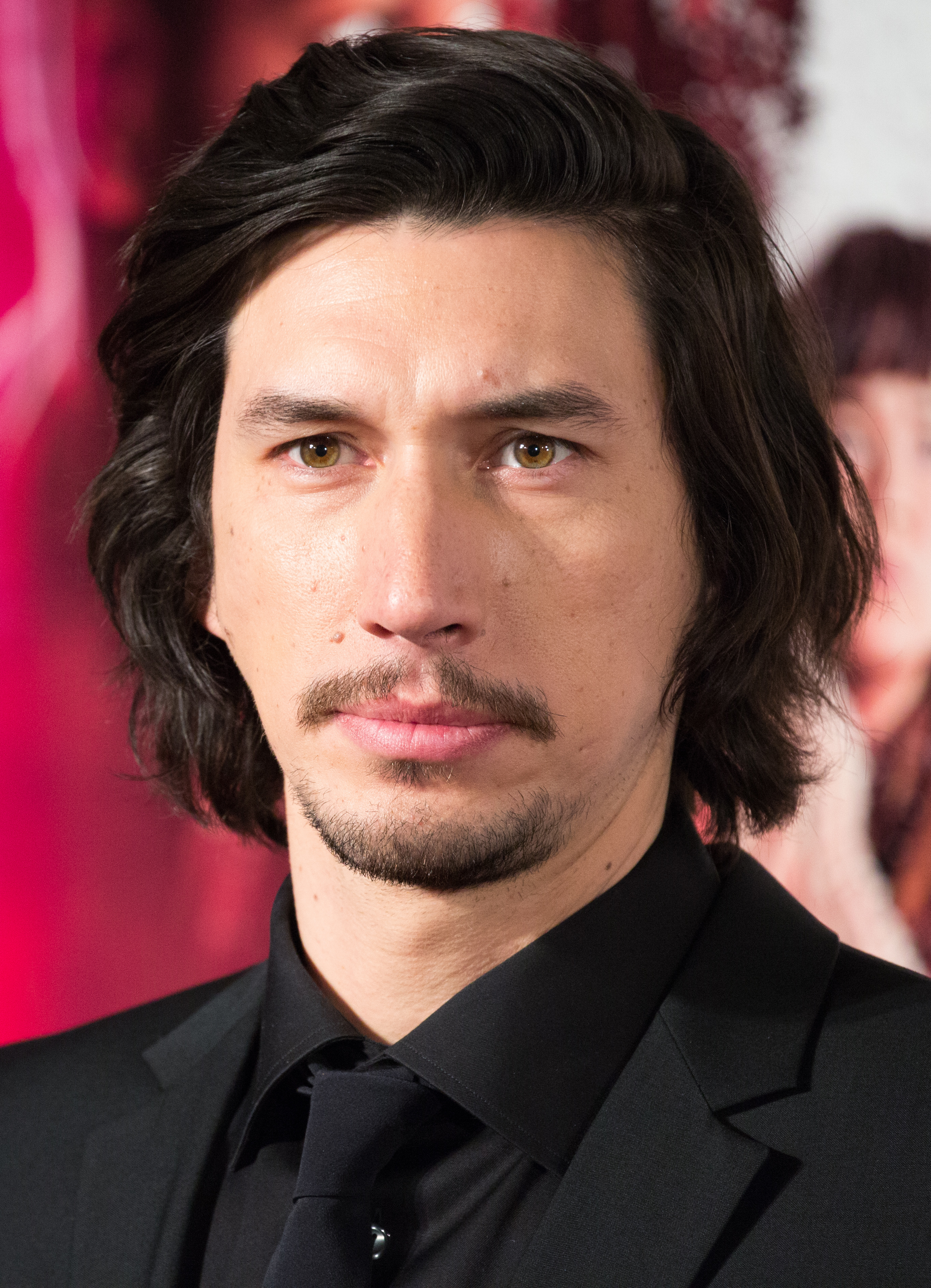
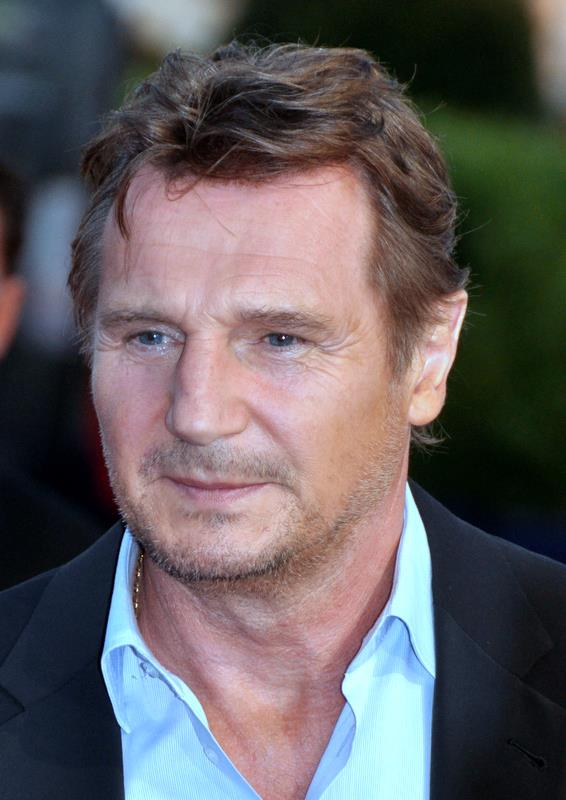
Andrew Garfield and Adam Driver portray the two Jesuit priests searching for Ferreira, played by Liam Neeson.
- Liam Neeson as the Jesuit Cristóvão Ferreira, who later in the film goes by the name Sawano Chūan.
- Andrew Garfield as Sebastião Rodrigues (based on Giuseppe Chiara), who later in the film goes by the name Okada San'emon. In interviews, Garfield has spoken of his extensive year-long preparation for the role with James Martin, a Jesuit priest working in New York. Garfield detailed that the preparation with Martin included extensive research and immersion in the Jesuit lifestyle and frame of mind, which the producers felt was essential to the accuracy of the film. Garfield reported losing forty pounds to play the role, following the rules of abstention which were outlined to him by Martin.
- Adam Driver as Francisco Garupe. Both Driver and Garfield went through a seven-day Jesuit silent prayer retreat arranged with the help of the Jesuit scholar Martin to prepare them for their roles in the film. Garfield, in an interview with Stephen Colbert, stated that both actors felt emaciated in preparing for their roles, and that Driver lost close to fifty pounds in preparation to play his role in the film.
- Tadanobu Asano as The Interpreter
- Ciarán Hinds as the Jesuit Alessandro Valignano and the voice of Jesus
- Shinya Tsukamoto as Mokichi. Tsukamoto felt that the relation of his character to Rodrigues was of central importance to the thematic content of the film. He adopted a lifestyle of fasting and abstention from social interaction throughout the production of the film. He reported that he and Garfield tried to stay in character on the sets even between takes.
- Issey Ogata as Inoue Masashige (based on the 17th-century Grand Councilor (ōmetsuke))
- Yōsuke Kubozuka as Kichijirō
- Nana Komatsu as Mónica (Haru)
- Ryo Kase as João (Chokichi)
- Katsuo Nakamura as Monk
- Yoshi Oida as Ichizo
- Béla Baptiste as Dieter Albrecht (based on Engelbert Kaempfer, a chronicler who traveled with the Dutch East India Company)

== Production ==
=== Development ===
In an interview with America Magazine in December 2016, Scorsese stated that he first read Shūsaku Endō's novel Silence in 1989, when he was invited by Akira Kurosawa to Japan to play the part of Vincent van Gogh in Kurosawa's film Dreams (1990). Scorsese obtained the film rights soon afterwards.

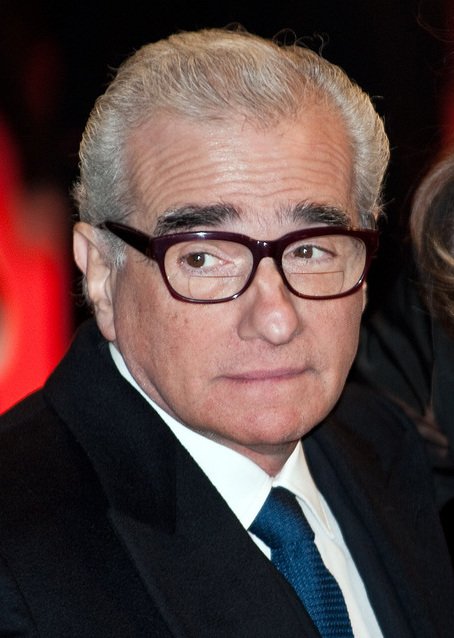
Scorsese at the Berlin International Film Festival in 2010. He first read the Endō novel while acting in the role of Vincent van Gogh painting Wheatfield with Crows for Akira Kurosawa's film Dreams.

Scorsese considered Silence a "passion project": it had been in development since 1990, two years after the release of his film The Last Temptation of Christ, which also carried strongly religious themes. When asked why he retained interest in the project for over 26 years, Scorsese said:

As you get older, ideas go and come. Questions, answers, loss of the answer again and more questions, and this is what really interests me. Yes, the cinema and the people in my life and my family are most important, but ultimately as you get older, there's got to be more ... Silence is just something that I'm drawn to in that way. It's been an obsession, it has to be done ... it's a strong, wonderful true story, a thriller in a way, but it deals with those questions.

In 2009, with the production beginning to coalesce, Scorsese and a production crew went to Nagasaki, Japan, visiting the original sites that served as the setting for Endō's novel. Additional location scouting was conducted in Canada. However, Silence entered a state of development hell soon afterwards, and Scorsese decided to work on Shutter Island and Hugo instead. In December 2011, Scorsese stated that Silence would be his next film. By March, although he originally put it on the back burner and consequently dropped out, Scorsese signed back on to The Wolf of Wall Street and opted to direct it ahead of Silence. However, at the time, Scorsese's publicist stated that Silence would come first. In May, the film picked up another producer in the recently revived Cecchi Gori Pictures, which placed the project first on its slate of upcoming films. Cecchi Gori was involved in pre-production for Silence, but years of unrelated legal disputes had interrupted its association to the film.

After filming of The Wolf of Wall Street concluded in January 2013, Scorsese committed to following it up with Silence. On April 19, 2013, it was announced that Scorsese would begin production on Silence in 2014, after a reputed 23-year wait. Irwin Winkler was announced as a producer the same day, as were Randall Emmett and George Furla, who would finance the production through their company Emmett/Furla Films. Paul Breuls' Corsan Films was also reportedly funding the project. Additionally, it was announced that the film would be shot in Taiwan.

Producer Irwin Winkler stated the choice to film in Taiwan was due to lower costs. "[The movie] was very, very expensive, and it was budgeted, because it takes place in 1670 in Japan. We got lucky and found out about Taipei, and in and around Taipei and Taiwan, we found great, great locations. The prices were very cheap, and we were able to make it for a price." Winkler disclosed that the tight budget forced many of the cast and crew, including himself, to work for minimum pay: "And all the actors, Liam Neeson, Adam Driver, everybody worked for scale. Marty worked for scale, I worked for under scale. We gave back money." James Martin, a Jesuit priest and published Catholic scholar, as well as Catholic scholar Liam Brockey, worked closely with the filmmakers to ensure an accurate portrayal of the Jesuits.

=== Legal claims ===
Scorsese's complex filmmaking commitments to multiple film projects resulted in an early legal challenge before filming of Silence could be initiated. In August 2012, Cecchi Gori Pictures sued Scorsese over an alleged breach of contract agreements related to Silence. According to the company, in 1990 Scorsese signed a written agreement to direct Silence. Scorsese was supposed to shoot the film following 1997's Kundun, and Cecchi Gori Pictures had apparently invested more than $750,000 for this purpose. However, Scorsese chose to make Bringing Out the Dead, Gangs of New York and The Aviator first.

In 2004, Scorsese purportedly signed deals to postpone the film further, in order to direct The Departed and Shutter Island. In 2011, Scorsese ostensibly agreed to one more deal, delaying Silence to direct Hugo. Cecchi Gori Pictures asserted that Scorsese agreed to pay "substantial compensation and other valuable benefits" in order to first direct The Departed, Shutter Island and Hugo. The company said the fees were "$1 million to $1.5 million per film plus up to 20 percent of Scorsese's backend compensation". The complaint was founded on the company's allegation that Scorsese failed to pay the fees agreed upon for Hugo, and that he breached the contract's terms by filming The Wolf of Wall Street ahead of Silence. Scorsese, via his representatives, responded: "The claims asserted are completely contradicted by, inconsistent with, and contrary to the express terms of an agreement entered into by the parties last year." He also denounced the lawsuit as a "media stunt" and a "meritless action". The lawsuit was settled on January 17, 2014. The terms of the settlement are sealed.

=== Writing ===
This film marks the second adaptation of Shūsaku Endō's novel, which was previously adapted by Masahiro Shinoda into the 1971 film of the same name. Scorsese penned the initial screenplay in 1991 with co-writer and long-time collaborator Jay Cocks. However, they were unsatisfied with the script and conducted rewrites for an additional 15 years. Later, Endō's official translator, Van C. Gessel, who has translated eight of his novels, assisted as a consultant on the film. The screenplay as finally filmed was assessed in critical review as an accurate depiction of the novel as written by Endō.

=== Casting ===
Beginning in 2009 and into 2010, Daniel Day-Lewis, Benicio del Toro and Gael García Bernal were in negotiations to star. In 2011, the film officially lost the involvement of Day-Lewis, del Toro, and García Bernal. In May 2013, Andrew Garfield and Ken Watanabe joined the cast with Watanabe as the priests' translator. However, due to scheduling conflicts, Watanabe was replaced by Tadanobu Asano in January 2015. In January 2014, Adam Driver and Liam Neeson joined the film, with Driver as Francisco Garupe, the second Jesuit priest, and Neeson as the priests' mentor, Cristóvão Ferreira.

Having completed the Spiritual Exercises of Ignatius of Loyola for playing a Jesuit in the movie, Andrew Garfield said: "What was really easy was falling in love with this person, was falling in love with Jesus Christ. That was the most surprising thing."

=== Filming ===
In January 2012, Scorsese discussed the possibility of utilizing 3D, however reconsidered. By February 2014, Scorsese had begun scouting locations in Taiwan, with filming set for the summer, and eventually pushed back to early 2015. Principal photography took place in Taiwan from January 30 to May 15, 2015, using studios in Taipei and Taichung and locations in Hualien County.

On January 28, 2015, the production experienced an accident at Taiwan's CMPC Studios. According to a spokesperson for the film, a tragic incident occurred in one of the backlots of the production when a ceiling collapsed, which resulted in the death of one contracted employee and the injury of two others.

Scorsese and cinematographer Rodrigo Prieto drew inspiration from painters from the Baroque period when determining the color palettes of the film, using blue and cyan tones at the beginning and later a golden-yellow hue, which in Prieto's opinion, gave the film a sense of progression in color. While Prieto shot the landscapes and the actors using film stock, he resorted to digital when it came to the night scenes.

Prieto found some difficulties when shooting the film. With the weather constantly changing, he would have inconsistencies in terms of lighting that he solved by filming some sequences at night time that would be lit for either dusk or sunset. To simulate moonlight for many of the night scenes, Prieto used a rig of blue-green lights called the "UFO" and hung them on a crane.

=== Music ===
The music for the film was composed by Kim Allen Kluge, the former music director at Quad City Symphony Orchestra, and Kathryn Kluge. Much of the soundtrack includes ambient nocturnal and ocean sounds repeated over several of the tracks. A 51-minute soundtrack of 25 tracks was released on February 17, 2017, by the recording studio for Rhino Warner Classics under ASIN release number B01N7S3IB9. An extended track of 12 minutes titled "Meditation" is included as the leading track on the soundtrack release.

== Release ==
Scorsese brokered several distribution deals when he attended the 2013 Cannes Film Festival. In July 2014, Paramount Pictures acquired distribution rights for the United States and Canada and optimistically eyed a late 2015 release. Discussing the film in March 2016, Winkler revealed the film was in the editing process and that the film would be released "at the end of the year", confirming a 2016 release date. In August 2016, Scorsese stated the film would be completed in October, and the 2016 release of the film depended on Paramount. Paramount Pictures released the first trailer for the film on November 22, 2016.

The world premiere of the film was held at the Pontifical Oriental Institute in Rome on November 29, followed by a special screening the next day in Vatican City. It received a limited release (in four theaters) on December 23, 2016, in order to qualify for 2017 Oscar nominations, which expanded to 1580 theaters on January 20.

=== Home media ===
The film was released on Blu-ray and DVD on March 28, 2017, with a slightly earlier release date of March 14, 2017, set for digital streaming of the film.

== Reception ==
=== Box office ===
Silence grossed $7.1 million in the United States and Canada and $16.6 million in other territories for a worldwide total of $24 million, against a production budget of $40–50 million.

In the USA, the film had its expansion alongside the openings of Monster Trucks, The Bye Bye Man and Sleepless, as well as the wide expansions of Live by Night and Patriots Day. The film was expected to gross $4–6 million from 747 theaters in its four-day MLK opening weekend. It ended up debuting to $1.9 million (a four-day total of $2.3 million), finishing 15th at the box office. Deadline Hollywood attributed the film's low opening to its 161-minute runtime and lack of major award nominations to create buzz. Similarly, The Hollywood Reporter noted that, unlike some of the other films released, Silence was playing in fewer cinemas and had been released at a time when the marketplace had "too many adult dramas" and "a lack of interest in the subject matter".

=== Critical response ===
On review aggregator website Rotten Tomatoes, the film has an approval rating of 83% based on 286 reviews, and an average rating of 7.60/10. The site's critical consensus reads: "Silence ends Martin Scorsese's decades-long creative quest with a thoughtful, emotionally resonant look at spirituality and human nature that stands among the director's finest works." On Metacritic, which assigns a weighted average rating, the film has a score of 79 out of 100, based on 48 critics, indicating "generally favorable reviews". Audiences polled by CinemaScore gave the film an average grade of "A" on an A+ to F scale. Several critics have referred to the film as being among the finest films of Scorsese's career.

Matt Zoller Seitz of RogerEbert.com gave the film four out of four stars, stating: "Silence is a monumental work, and a punishing one. It puts you through hell with no promise of enlightenment, only a set of questions and propositions, sensations and experiences ... This is not the sort of film you 'like' or 'don't like.' It's a film that you experience and then live with." Richard Roeper also awarded the film four out of four stars, saying: "When Ferreira finally appears and we learn the truth about where he's been all this time, it further serves Scorsese's central theme about the conflict between adhering to one's sacred vows and traditional beliefs and doing the right thing, the prudent thing, the moral thing, on a very pragmatic level."

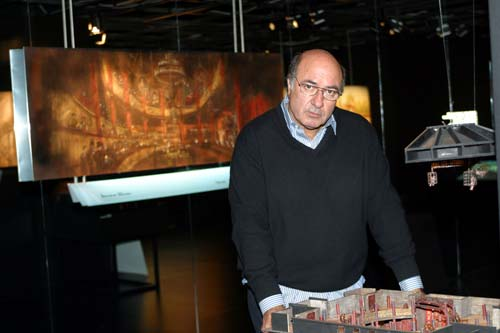
Dante Ferretti received praise from reviewer Justin Chang for his set designs used in the film.

Several reviewers such as Justin Chang and Mark Kermode emphasized Scorsese's collaboration with his production crew and with his actors as contributing to the film's quality. Writing for the Los Angeles Times, Justin Chang called the film an "anguished masterwork" for Scorsese, stating: "Working with such sterling past collaborators as editor Thelma Schoonmaker, production designer Dante Ferretti and cinematographer Rodrigo Prieto, Scorsese has done more than resurrect a vision of feudal Japan... Silence feels less like a feat of adaptation than an act of artistic submission". Mark Kermode writing for The Guardian indicated exemplary performances by the range of Japanese supporting actors in the cast, stating: "The real stars however, are the Japanese cast, from Yōsuke Kubozuka's enigmatic wretch, Kichijirō ... to Yoshi Oida's devout elder Ichizo, to whose village these priests bring both salvation and suffering. As a smiling, silver-tongued interpreter, Tadanobu Asano is a superb foil to the inquisitor, Inoue, played with fly-swatting menace by a wheedling Issey Ogata".

Apart from the narrative qualities of the film, the filmmaking was also praised for the depth and thoroughness of its thematic content. Peter Travers of Rolling Stone, who assigned it 3 1/2 stars out of four, wrote that Silence "offers frustratingly few answers but all the right questions" and argued that it is among the director's "most spiritually moving films to date". In Slant, Jesse Cataldo argued: "Tapping into the vast pool of vagueness and uncertainty that exists beneath the veneer of a rigid, righteous belief, Scorsese crafts a versatile, multifaceted work that encourages serious reflection and contemplation". Alissa Wilkinson of Vox wrote that Silence "is beautiful, unsettling and one of the finest religious movies ever made". John Ehrett of The Federalist praised the film highly, saying: "Silence is a must-see masterpiece about the paradoxes of faith." Ehrett further added: "Complex yet reverent, Silence explores the meanings and dilemmas of Christian faith, and decisively sets a new benchmark for religious films."

Some reviewers cited the legacy aspects of the film for Scorsese, and compared Scorsese to iconic director Ingmar Bergman. Ty Burr of The Boston Globe said: "The movie's being promoted as the third in the director's unofficial trilogy of faith, after The Last Temptation of Christ (1988) and Kundun (1997), and it feels like a self-conscious masterpiece, a summing-up from a filmmaker who, at 74, may be thinking of his legacy." Joshua Rothkopf of Time Out London gave the film five stars out of five, saying: "Scorsese has hit the rare heights of filmmakers like Ingmar Bergman and Carl Theodor Dreyer, artists who find in religion a battleground that leaves even the strongest in tatters, compromised and broken." Emma Green of The Atlantic gave the film high praise, stating: "This is what makes Scorsese's film so radical and so unlike many movies about religion: It's actually art." Robbie Collin of The Telegraph gave the film five stars out of five, stating: "Scorsese's brutal spiritual epic will scald, and succor, your soul." Collin further added: "It's the kind of work a great filmmaker can only pull off with a lifetime's accrued expertise behind him". Brian Truitt of USA Today gave the film three-and-a-half stars, stating: "With the religious historical drama Silence, Martin Scorsese proves he's as masterful a filmmaker with men of God as he is with gangsters." Truitt also argued that the film "marks one of the deeper and most thoughtful projects in Scorsese's career".

The film also garnered criticism. Writing for Variety, Peter Debruge found major flaws with the film, writing: "Though undeniably gorgeous, it is punishingly long, frequently boring, and woefully unengaging at some of its most critical moments. It is too subdued for Scorsese-philes, too violent for the most devout, and too abstruse for the great many moviegoers who such an expensive undertaking hopes to attract." John Patterson of The Guardian stated in his review: "I fear that Silence expired in the womb during that long gestation period. It is beautiful to look at, but feels inert, humourless and overly devout (to say nothing of over-long; Masahiro Shinoda's 1971 adaptation got Shūsako Endō's 1966 novel on to film using 30 fewer minutes than Scorsese). Perhaps that leap toward the devout is needed to savour it fully–and I found I couldn't make it."

In 2023, Cannes Film Festival director Thierry Frémaux revealed in a podcast that he mentioned to Scorsese in 2017 his belief that, had Silence premiered at Cannes first before going to theaters, it would have had a better reception.

In 2025, it was one of the films voted for the "Readers' Choice" edition of The New York Times' list of "The 100 Best Movies of the 21st Century," finishing at number 207.

=== Top ten lists ===
Silence was listed on numerous American critics' top ten lists for 2016.

- 1st – Justin Chang, Los Angeles Times
- 1st – Rene Rodriguez, Miami Herald
- 2nd – Joshua Rothkopf, Time Out New York
- 2nd – Glenn Kenny, RogerEbert.com
- 3rd – Mark Olsen, Los Angeles Times
- 4th – Ben Kenigsberg, RogerEbert.com
- 4th – William Bibbiani, CraveOnline
- 5th – Peter Travers, Rolling Stone
- 5th – K. Austin Collins, The Ringer
- 5th – Stephanie Zacharek, Time
- 5th – Brian Tallerico, RogerEbert.com
- 5th – Bilge Ebiri, L.A. Weekly
- 6th – Katie Rife, The A.V. Club
- 7th – Keith Phipps, Uproxx
- 8th – Jeffrey M. Anderson, San Francisco Examiner
- 8th – Alissa Wilkinson, Vox
- 8th – Witney Seibold, CraveOnline
- 9th – Todd McCarthy, The Hollywood Reporter
- 9th – Ignatiy Vishnevetsky, The A.V. Club
- 10th – Peter Sobczynski, RogerEbert.com
- Top 10 (listed alphabetically, not ranked) – Walter Addiego, San Francisco Chronicle
- Top 10 (listed alphabetically, not ranked) – Stephen Whitty, The Star-Ledger

=== Industry reception ===
Silence received an Academy Award nomination for Best Cinematography at the 89th Academy Awards. In addition to other competitive awards for which the film received accolades, the American Film Institute selected Silence as one of its ten Movies of the Year.

== Analysis ==
Scorsese has stated in interviews that among the most difficult aspects of the film to represent were the spiritual themes presented in Endō's original book used for the film. The first version of the script he attempted to write with his co-writer Jay Cocks managed to get only midway through the material before being set aside as insufficiently sensitive to the spiritual aspects of the book. It took Scorsese many years to envision a way to approach an accurate and informed filming of the scenes, involving spiritual transitions among the actors in the film.

Caesar A. Montevecchio of the University of Notre Dame published a theological assessment of the spiritual themes in the film concentrating on the act of priestly renunciation depicted towards the end, stating: "This climactic scene of Rodrigues trampling the fumi-e makes clear that Silence is as much about the object of Christian faith as it is the experience of that faith. As ambient and live sound are washed out entirely, Rodrigues hears the voice of Christ telling him to trample, that it was to be trampled upon that Christ came into the world. The object of faith becomes a Christ who is a hero of pity, who takes up the weakness and suffering of humankind as his cross, rather than a hero of triumphant resolve. The Jesus of Silence is one of utter kenosis (self-emptying), and one who in the mercy of that kenosis radically sympathizes with the weakness, and frailty, of human beings, even ones like Judas and Kichijirō."

David Sterritt in the book A Companion to Martin Scorsese discussed aspects of the theological themes in the film, stating: "According to an analysis of the novel by the Japanese-American theologian Fumitaka Masuoka, it pivots on the idea that the "silence" of God is in fact the "message" of God, being not the silence of "nihil", or 'nothingness', but rather 'the "accompaniment" for the forsaken and the suffering', and the concomitant silence of Christians quietly hoping for salvation. Implicit here is what Matsuoka terms 'an element of uncertainty', a possibility that the "nihil" of emptiness, meaninglessness, and hopelessness will eventually prevail. Uncertainty about the fate of the soul (or the self, for secularists) lies at the heart of human experience, injecting many a mind with the existential fear, trembling, and sickness unto death of which Søren Kierkegaard vividly wrote."

== See also ==
- Black Robe – 1991 Canadian film based on the novel by Brian Moore which deals with similar issues in 17th century Quebec.
- Martyrs of Japan – Christian missionaries who were martyred in Japan
- Silence (1971 film) – Japanese film adaptation of Shūsaku Endō's novel, directed by Masahiro Shinoda.
- The Mission (1986 film) – British period film about Jesuit missionaries in 18th-century South America.
- Os Olhos da Ásia – 1996 Portuguese film partially based on Endo's novel, directed by João Mário Grilo.
- The Sea and Poison – Another novel by Endo dealing with faith in Japan.
