= Cristóvão Ferreira =

Portuguese Jesuit missionary in Japan (c. 1580 – 1650)

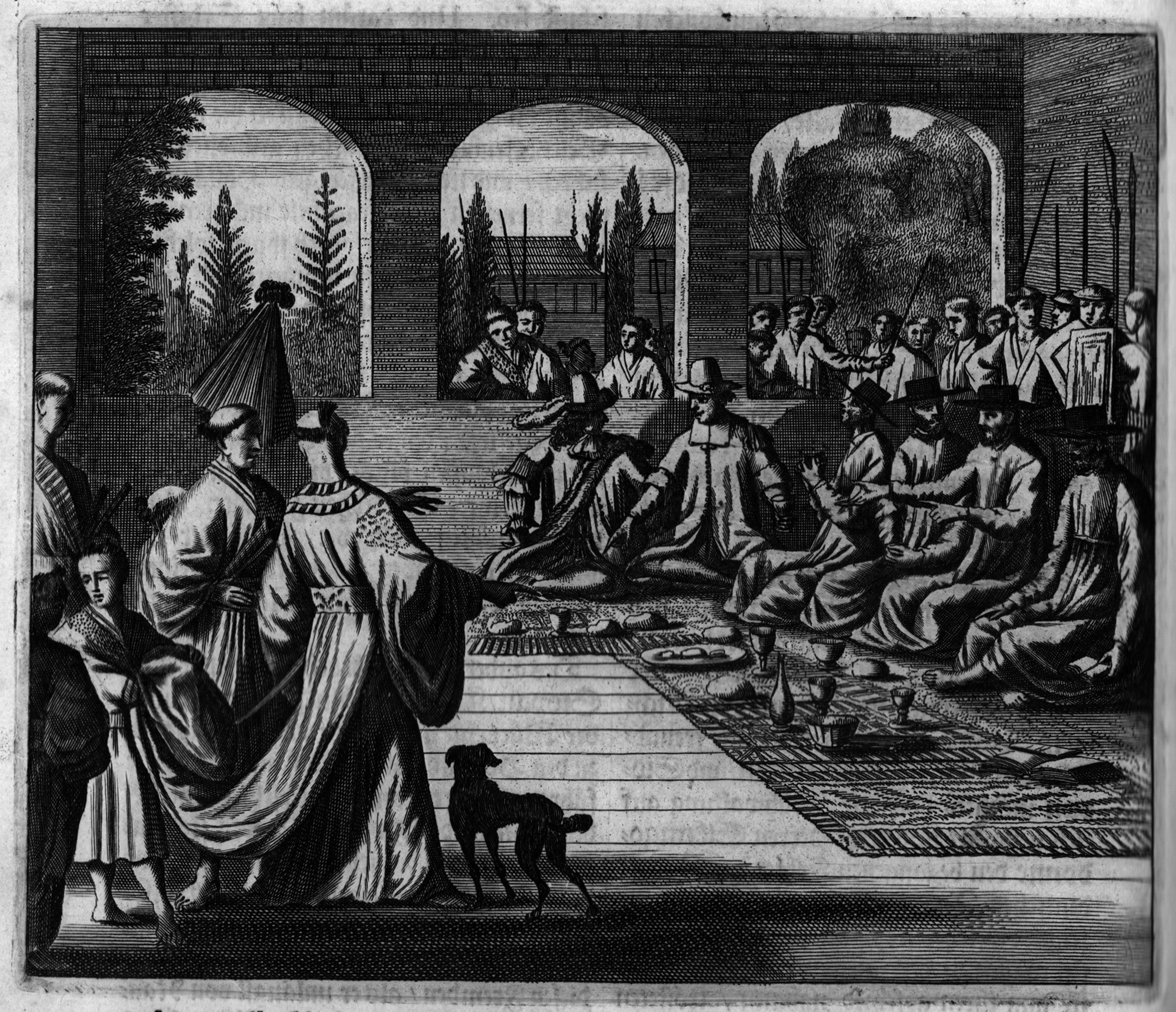
- Born: c. 1580; Torres Vedras, Portugal
- Died: 1650 (aged c. 70); Nagasaki, Japan
- Occupations: Catholic priest and Jesuit missionary

Cristóvão Ferreira (c. 1580–1650) was a Portuguese Catholic priest and Jesuit missionary who committed apostasy after being captured and tortured during the anti-Christian purges in 17th-century Japan. During the Tokugawa shogunate, Christian missionaries and their Japanese followers were persecuted, arrested and executed. Authorities were concerned that the religion was making followers loyal to Christian nations rather than the Emperor or the shogunate.

After Ferreira had renounced his faith, he remained in Japan for the rest of his life. He became known as one of the "fallen priests" who assisted Japanese authorities with their knowledge of Western philosophies and sciences.

== Early life and career ==
Born around 1580, in Torres Vedras, Portugal, Ferreira was sent to Asia, where he was a missionary from 1609 to 1633 in Japan, which was then ruled by the Tokugawa shogunate.

== Apostate ==
In 1633, Ferreira was captured and renounced Christianity after being tortured for five hours. He became the most famous of the "fallen priests" and changed his name to Sawano Chūan (Japanese: 沢野忠庵). He registered at a Buddhist temple in accordance with Japanese law, and called himself "a member of the Zen sect", but his own publications attest that he adopted a philosophy of natural law::Hubert Cieslik writes:

Viewing the world around we see that everything is endowed with its own nature and merit; bird or beast, insect or fish, grass or tree, earth or stone, air or water, each one has its natural quality and merit. All this is the work of Natura. Man stands at the head of all existence and Heaven has endowed mankind with the natural faculties of charity, justice, propriety, sagacity.

== Life after apostasy ==
After his apostasy he married a Japanese woman and wrote several books, including treatises on Western astronomy and medicine, which became widely distributed in the Edo period. He also is alleged to have privately written a book on religion entitled 「顕偽録」 (The Deception Revealed) in 1636, but it was not published for 300 years and there is some controversy concerning who wrote it. He participated in government trials of other captured Jesuits. He was often present during the use of fumi-e, whereby suspected Christians were ordered to trample on an image of Jesus Christ.

== Death ==
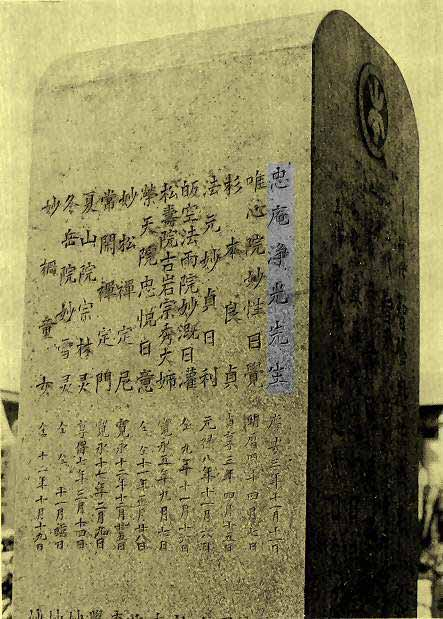
Ferreira was interred in the gravesite of his son-in-law Sugimoto Chūkei's family.

He died in Nagasaki in 1650. Some reports claim that, just before his death he recanted, was tortured and died as a martyr, while other reports merely note that he died.

== In popular culture ==
Shusaku Endo's novel Silence is set in the aftermath of Ferreira's apostasy. Ferreira is played by Tetsurō Tamba in the 1971 film version and by Liam Neeson in the 2016 film version. In the 1996 Portuguese drama film Os Olhos da Ásia, João Perry plays Ferreira.

== See also ==
- List of converts to Buddhism from Christianity
- List of Westerners who visited Japan before 1868
