= Duas Mulheres =

- Directed by: João Mário Grilo
- Written by: Rui Cardoso Martins; Tereza Coelho
- Starring: Beatriz Batarda; Débora Monteiro; Virgílio Castelo
- Distributed by: Costa do Castelo (Portugal)
- Release dates: November 2009 (Estoril Film Festival); June 24, 2010 (Portugal)
- Country: Portugal
- Language: Portuguese

Duas Mulheres is a 2009 Portuguese drama film directed by João Mário Grilo.

== Cast ==
- Beatriz Batarda as Joana
- Débora Monteiro
- Virgílio Castelo

== Reception ==
Beatriz Batarda was nominated for Best Actress at the 2011 Globos de Ouro.

In Público's Ípsilon, Jorge Mourinha gave the film two out of five stars and Mário Jorge Torres gave it three out of five.
