= Silence (1971 film) =

1971 Japanese film

- Theatrical release poster

Japanese name
- Kanji: 沈黙
- Hiragana: ちんもく
- Katakana: チンモク
Transcriptions
- Romanization: Chinmoku
- Directed by: Masahiro Shinoda
- Screenplay by: Shūsaku Endō; Masahiro Shinoda
- Based on: Silence (1966 novel) by Shūsaku Endō
- Produced by: Kiyoshi Iwashita; Kinshirô Kuzui; Tadasuke Ômura
- Starring: David Lampson; Don Kenny; Tetsurō Tamba; Shima Iwashita
- Cinematography: Kazuo Miyagawa
- Edited by: Shikako Takahashi
- Music by: Tōru Takemitsu
- Distributed by: Toho
- Release date: 13 November 1971 (Japan)
- Running time: 129 minutes
- Country: Japan
- Languages: Japanese; English

Silence (Japanese: 沈黙, Hepburn: Chinmoku) is a 1971 Japanese historical drama film directed by Masahiro Shinoda from a screenplay he co-wrote with Shūsaku Endō, adapted from Endō's 1966 novel. It stars Tetsurō Tamba, Mako, Eiji Okada, and Shima Iwashita alongside English actors David Lampson and Don Kenny. Endo co-wrote the screenplay with Masahiro Shinoda. Most of the film's dialogue is in Japanese, though it has short sequences in English.

The film's themes analyze the conflict of human nature versus divine requirements and their compatibility, life's purpose, the interplay of emotional needs, suffering, and contentment. The storytelling device the film uses is circumstantial and depicts the struggles of life, allegorical presentation, and Christian theology. It is the first of three movie adaptations of the novel, succeeded by the Portuguese Os Olhos da Ásia in 1996 and the 2016 American film of the same name.

Silence was entered Un Certain Regard into the 1972 Cannes Film Festival, and won four Mainichi Film Awards including Best Film and Best Director.

== Plot ==
In the 17th century, two Portuguese Jesuit priests, Rodrigo and Garupe, travel to Japan to proselytize despite a formal ban on the practice or promotion of Christianity. They also search for their mentor Ferreira, with whom they lost contact five years prior and presume is imprisoned. Rodrigo is patronizing and Garupe is cautious. The two priests are overwhelmed with the welcome they receive from the persecuted Japanese Christians, but occasionally wish for some comfort food from home.

They travel to the village of Kichijiro, the fisherman who smuggled them into Japan from China. Returning, they learn that a detachment of Japanese officials and samurai have arrived to search for them. With most of their flock taken into custody or tortured for refusing to betray them, the two priests decide to leave but they become separated. Kichijiro finds Rodrigo and joins with him; he confesses to Rodrigo he is a weak man, and that his family was slaughtered for being Christians. Nagasaki Magistrate Inoue's men capture Rodrigo and throw 300 pieces of silver at Kichijiro (reminiscent of Judas Iscariot). He later gives away the money to a prostitute for emotional support.

Inoue takes Rodrigo to Nagasaki and puts him on trial. Later, he and other prisoners are forced to watch as a Christian samurai family are publicly humiliated and threatened for practicing Christianity; the wife, Kiku, recants, and the husband is put to death for his defiance. Kichijiro, guilt-ridden for his treachery, sneaks into the holding cell, asks Rodrigo to forgive him. He says he betrayed Rodrigo because everyone shamed him for recanting his faith and so he despises anyone who reminds him of it.

Inoue, through his interpreter, invites Rodrigo for a talk in private. Inoue says the Catholic Church is unwanted in Japan, comparing Rodrigo's faith to a concubine who makes trouble for a man's conscience. Rodrigo says the truth of the Church is universal and as the happiness between a man and woman is disturbed, the State disturbs the efforts of the Church to spread its teachings of peace and brotherhood. Each accuses the other of ignorance, but Inoue is eventually swayed somewhat by Rodrigo's conviction. Nonetheless, he is bound by the shogun's law to ban Christianity.

Later Rodrigo is taken to the seaside and sees Garupe, who has been taken prisoner along with his Japanese companions. The interpreter tells Rodrigo that Inoue wants him to witness Garupe apostatizing his faith; if he fails to do so, the Japanese converts will be killed. While Garupe's companions are drowned one by one, the priest defies his captors, frees himself, and jumps into the sea. He tries to pull the drowning victims to safety but is stabbed at by spear-wielding samurai and slowly loses his strength until he drowns as well.

Later, Rodrigo is taken to a Buddhist temple to visit Inoue's friend, Lord Chuan Sawano. Sawano turns out to be Ferreira, who has apostatized and is working under Inoue as an astronomy scholar, tasked with exposing errors and inconsistencies in the Bible and other Christian writings. Sawano advises his former student to renounce the Church and Christianity; Rodrigo rebukes him. Sawano says he preached in Japan for twenty years, and he knows this is not a land where Christianity can be rooted but a terrifying swamp where seedlings can rot and die and the inculturation of Christianity is the worst. Rodrigo rejects all these claims and censures him by saying that this wouldn't be the attitude of Saint Xavier.

Rodrigo is then hung upside down in a pit with a small incision at the back of his ear for the blood to drip slowly. Sawano visits him and explains that three newly recanted Christian believers have been hung upside down next to him for the past six hours. Sawano says he was in the same cell where Rodrigo is now and was hung for two days and there were five men who were hung in the pit, and he can still hear their voices. The former priest admits that the real reason he renounced his faith was not because of the torture, but the absence of God in others' suffering. Rodrigo replies those who are in suffering will receive eternal happiness for their pain. Sawano mocks him, and notes that if Rodrigo sacrifices his faith for the sake of love, the other three men will be spared and given medical treatment.

The interpreter comes with a fumi-e and encourages Rodrigo to step on it as Sawano watches and chants silently. Rodrigo steps on the fumi-e and a rooster crows twice (reminiscent of Saint Peter's denial). Later, a complacent Rodrigo is shown helping Inoue's officers to identify forbidden Christian objects being smuggled in by foreign ships. Rodrigo is asked to comment on a cup, and he says it's not a chalice because the stem would have been longer. He eventually becomes a samurai and is given Kiku as his wife; from that day forward, he is given her dead husband's name Sanemon Okada as Ferreira was given the title of Lord Sawano. A happy Kichijiro is shown sweeping the surroundings.

== Cast ==
- David Lampson as Sebastian Rodrigo
- Don Kenny as Francisco Garupe
- Tetsurō Tamba as Cristóvão Ferreira
- Mako Iwamatsu as Kichijiro
- Rokko Toura as The Interpreter
- Eiji Okada as Inoue
- Yoshi Katō as Old Man
- Noboru Matsuhashi as Mokichi
- Shima Iwashita as Kiku
- Yûsuke Takita as Ichizo

== See also ==
- Os Olhos da Ásia - A loose 1996 Portuguese film adaptation of Endō's novel
- Silence - A 2016 American film adaptation
