= Miguel Chijiwa =

Christian samurai (1569?–1633)

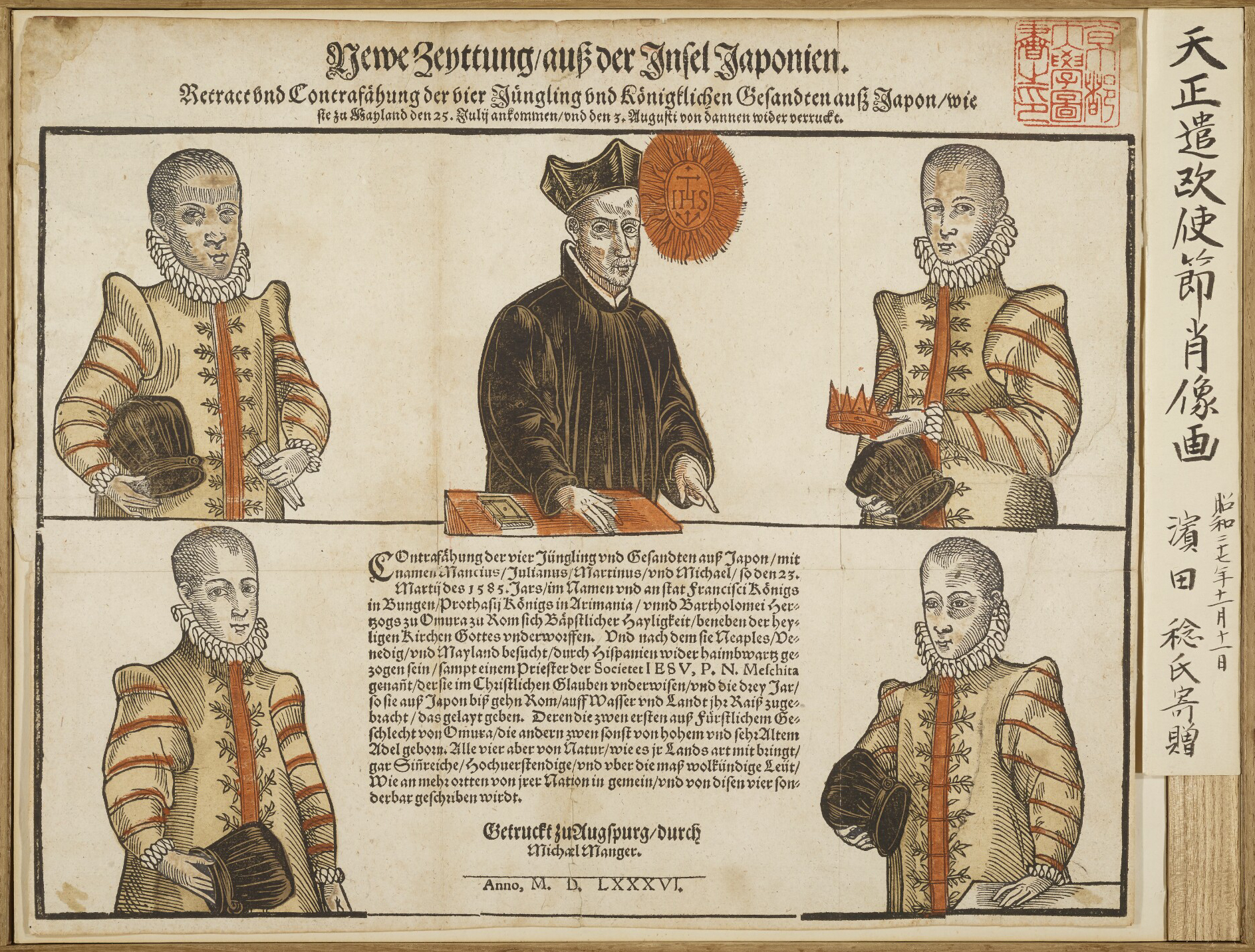
The first Japanese Embassy to Europe, in 1586. Top, from left to right: Julião Nakaura, Father Mesquita, Mancio Ito. Bottom, from left to right: Martinão Hara, Miguel Chijiwa.

Miguel Chijiwa (千々石ミゲル, Chijiwa Migeru) (1569? – January 23, 1633) was a member of the Japanese delegation to European Christendom, also known as the Tenshō embassy. Later, he abandoned the Christian faith. However, the recent discovery of a rosary in his graveyard made public on September 8, 2017, has cast doubt upon his apostasy. Also, in 2026 a cross was found inside his coffin, which moved the consensus towards believing that he kept his Christian Faith.

== In popular media ==
A "brother Michael" appears in the 1975 novel Shōgun. In its 1980 adaptation to TV, Michael is played by Masumi Okada. In the 1996 Portuguese film Os Olhos da Ásia, Miguel is played by Yasukiyo Umeno. In Tenshō Kennō Shōnen Shisetsu, Miguel is played by Ryouta Murai. In the 2019 miniseries MAGI Tensho Keno Shonen Shisetsu, Miguel is played by Atsushi Ogata.
