= Tenshō embassy =

1582–1590 Japanese embassy to Europe

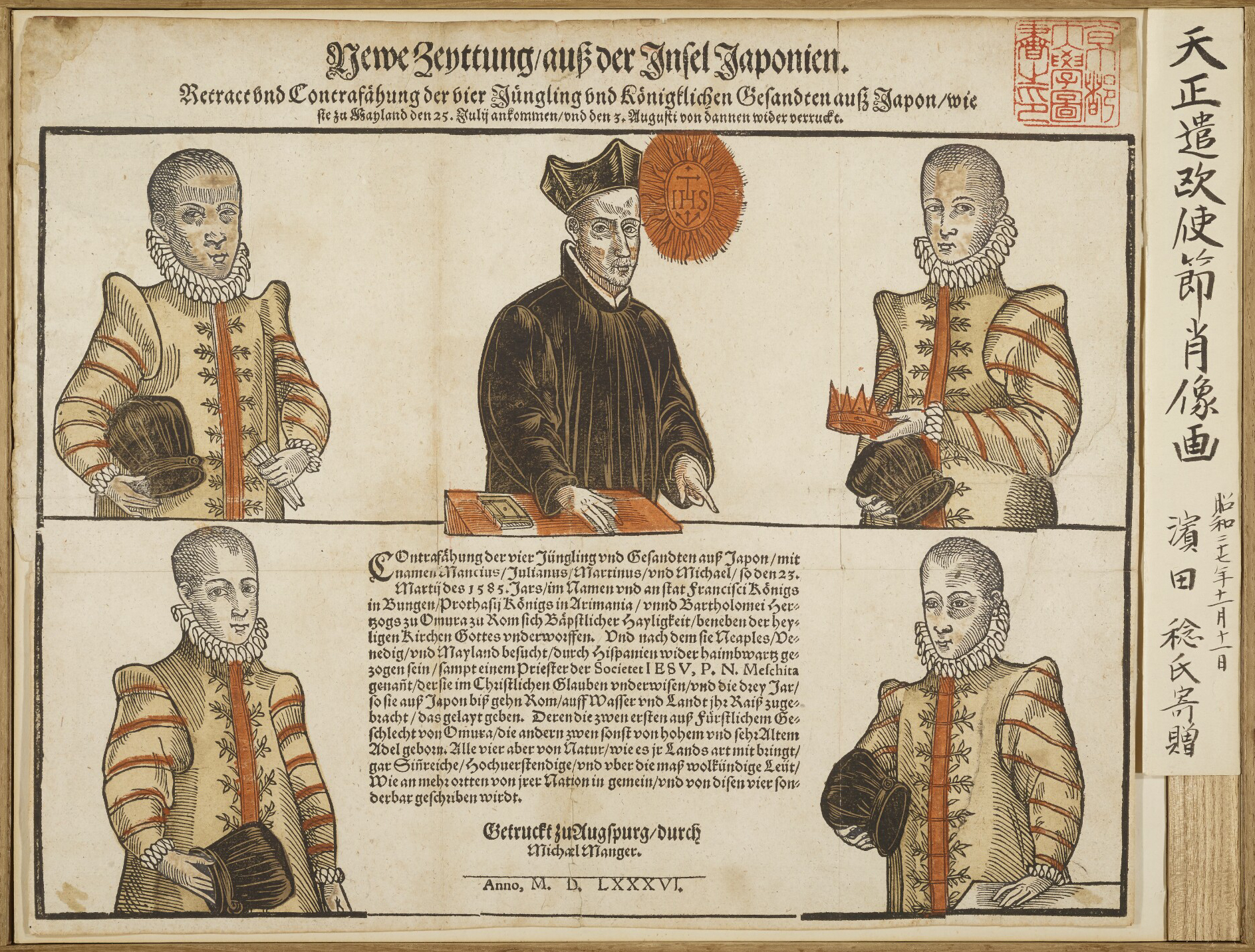
The first Japanese Embassy to Europe, in 1586. Top, from left to right: Julião Nakaura, Father Diogo de Mesquita, Mancio Itō. Bottom, from left to right: Martinho Hara, Miguel Chijiwa.

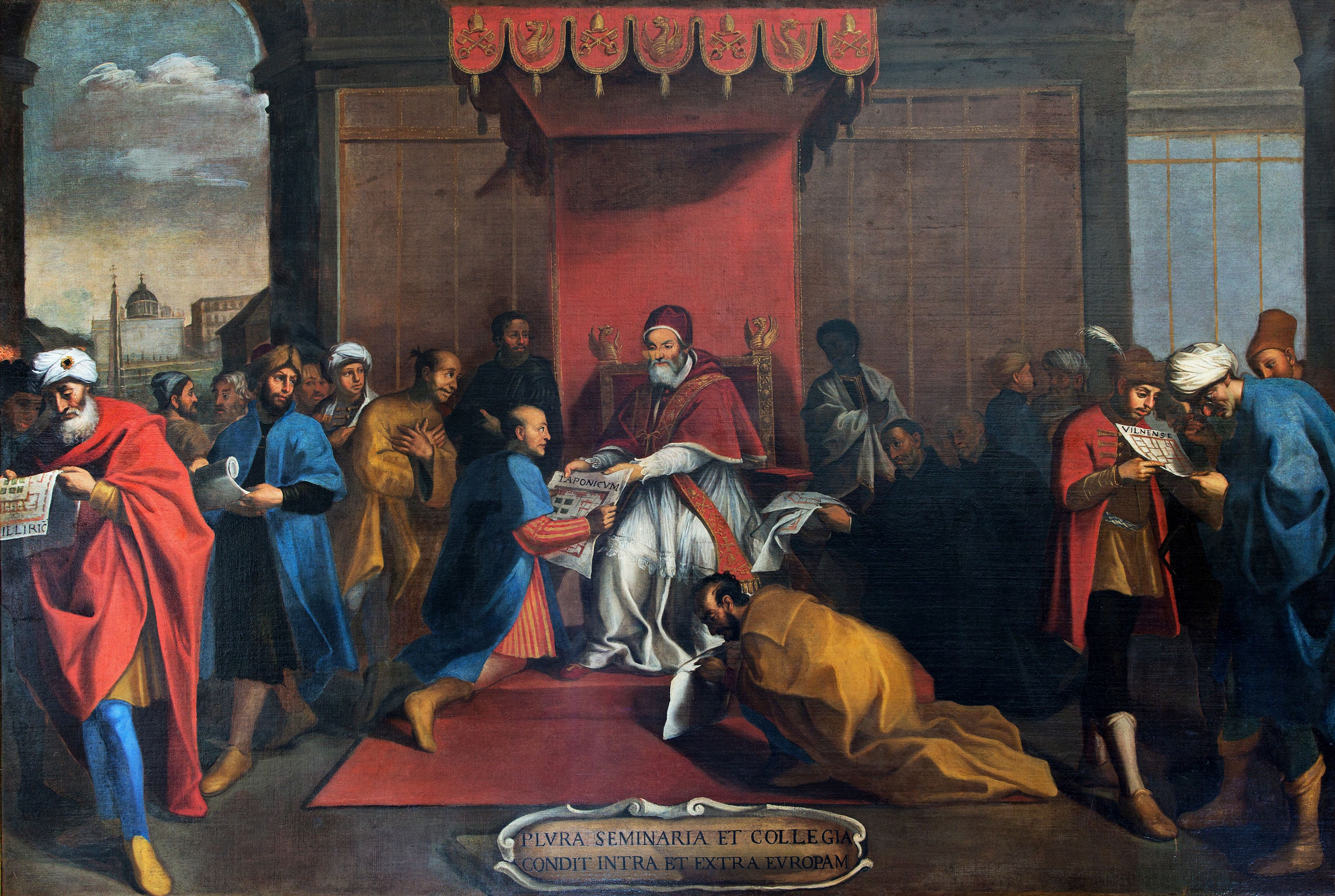
The Japanese embassy with Pope Gregory XIII on March 23, 1585.

The Tenshō embassy (Japanese: 天正の使節, named after the Tenshō Era in which the embassy took place) was an embassy sent by the Japanese Christian Lord Ōtomo Sōrin to the Pope and the kings of Europe in 1582. The embassy was led by Mancio Itō (伊東 マンショ Itō Mansho, 1570–1612), a Japanese nobleman, who was the first official Japanese emissary to Europe.

== Embassy ==
The idea of sending a Japanese embassy to Europe was originally conceived by the Jesuit Alessandro Valignano, and sponsored by the three Kirishitan daimyōs Ōmura Sumitada (1533–1587), Ōtomo Sōrin (1530–1587), and Arima Harunobu (1567–1612). Mancio Itō was chosen to act as a spokesman for the group dispatched by Ōtomo Sōrin, who was daimyō of the Bungo Province on Kyūshū and a close relative of Mancio's father; Shurinosuke Itō. On February 20, 1582, Mancio Itō left Nagasaki in company with three other noblemen:

- Miguel Chijiwa (千々石 ミゲル Chijiwa Migeru)
- Julião Nakaura (中浦 ジュリアン Nakaura Jurian)
- Martinho Hara (原 マルチノ Hara Maruchino)

They were accompanied by two servants, their tutor and interpreter Diogo de Mesquita, and their mentor Valignano, who only accompanied them as far as Goa in Portuguese India, where he was to take up new responsibilities. They spent nine months visiting the Portuguese territories of Macau, Kochi, Madagascar and Goa on their way to Lisbon, where they arrived on 11 August 1584. From there, the ambassadors went on to Madrid and then to Rome, which were the two main goals of their journey. In Spain they visited Talavera de la Reina, Toledo, Madrid, where they met with Philip II who was king of Spain and Portugal. They visited El Escorial monastery, the Alcalá University, Murcia and Alicante. In Rome, Mancio Itō became an honorary citizen and taken into the ranks of European nobility with the title Cavaliere di Speron d'oro ("Knight of the Golden Spur"). During their stay in Europe, they met with King Philip II of Spain, Francesco I de' Medici, Grand Duke of Tuscany, Pope Gregory XIII, and his successor Pope Sixtus V.

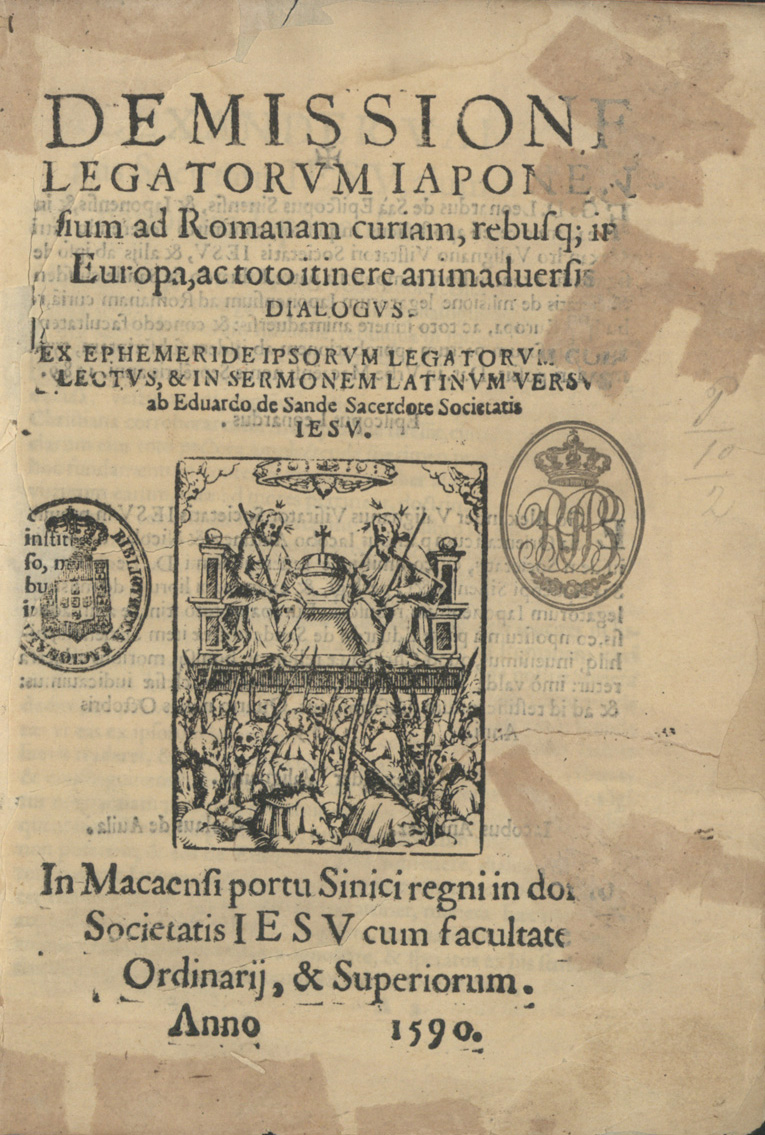
Title page of the Mission report

The ambassadors arrived back in Japan on July 21, 1590. On their eight-year-long voyage they had been instructed to take notes. These notes provided the basis for the De Missione Legatorum Iaponensium ad Romanam Curiam ("The Mission of the Japanese Legates to the Roman Curia"), a Macau-based writing by Jesuit Duarte de Sande published in 1590. According to Derek Massarella, "Valignano conceived the idea of a book based on the boys’ travels, one that could also be used for teaching purposes in Jesuit colleges in Japan," but "despite its authors’ intentions," De Missione "made no lasting impact on Japanese perceptions of Europe.

The four were subsequently ordained as the first Japanese Jesuit fathers by Alessandro Valignano.

Mancio Itō died in Nagasaki on November 13, 1612. Martinho Hara was banished from Japan by the Tokugawa shogunate in 1614, and acted in Macau. He died in Macau on October 23, 1629. Miguel Chijiwa left the Society of Jesus before 1601, and died in Nagasaki on January 23, 1633. Although he is generally believed to have abandoned Christianity, the discovery of what appear to be rosary beads in his grave in 2017 place this in some doubt. Julião Nakaura was caught by the Tokugawa shogunate, and died a martyr by torture in Nagasaki on November 21, 1633. He was beatified on November 24, 2008.

== Itinerary ==
=== 1583 ===
- February: Four Japanese, Mancio Itō, Miguel Chijiwa, Julião Nakaura, and Martinho Hara, with Alessandro Valignano, Father Nuno Rodrigues, translator Diogo de Mesquita, and a servant depart Nagasaki.
- March: 9 Macau. Chinese servant joins group.
- Through the middle of the year, they cross from Malacca to Cochin to Goa.
- September 12: Valignano prepares letter of instructions at Goa and Father Nuno Rodrigues takes charge.

=== 1584 ===
- August 10: Lisbon.
- September: Évora.
- October 1: Toledo Received by Archbishop Gaspar de Quiroga.
- October 20: Madrid Illness of Hara.
- November 14: Received by Philip II.
- November: Visits to Empress Maria of Austria and El Escorial. They see the king's Indian rhinoceros.
- November 26: Alcala de Henares.
- Christmas: Murcia.

=== 1585 ===
- January: Alicante.
- March 1: Livorno, Italy.
- March 2: Pisa.
- March 7: Florence.
- March 22: Arrival in Rome; received at Church of the Gesù by Father General Claudio Acquaviva. Nakaura ill with fever.
- March 23: From Villa Giulia through throngs to Castle of St. Angelo, then to Vatican to attend Papal consistory in Sala Regia; embraced by Pope Gregory XIII. They dine in the Papal apartments, receive suits of clothes, and present Sixtus a pair of folding screens (now lost) depicting Azuchi, site of Nobunaga's castle.
- April 10: Pope Gregory XIII dies.
- May 1: Coronation of Pope Sixtus V.
- May: Knighted by Pope Sixtus into the Order of the Golden Spur.
- June 3: Departure from Rome.
- June: Assisi.
- June: Loreto.
- June 25: Arrival from Ferrara by riverboat at Chioggia and escorted to Venice, amid great acclaim.
- July 13: Mantua.
- July: Verona.
- July 25: Milan.
- August 8: Genoa.
- August 16: Barcelona.
- September: Santa Maria de Montserrat Abbey.
- They travel to Monzón and Zaragoza.
- Return via Alcalá de Henares, Madrid, Vila Viçosa, Évora.
- Coimbra.

=== 1586 ===
- April 8: Depart Lisbon for return.

=== 1587 ===
- May 29: Reached Goa, reunited with Valignano.

=== 1590 ===
- July 21: Arrival in Japan

== See also ==
- Bernardo the Japanese, the first Japanese to visit Europe, in 1553.
- Hasekura Tsunenaga, another Japanese embassy to Europe in 1615.
