= Fumi-e =

Pictures of Christian figures to be stepped upon by suspected Christians in Japan

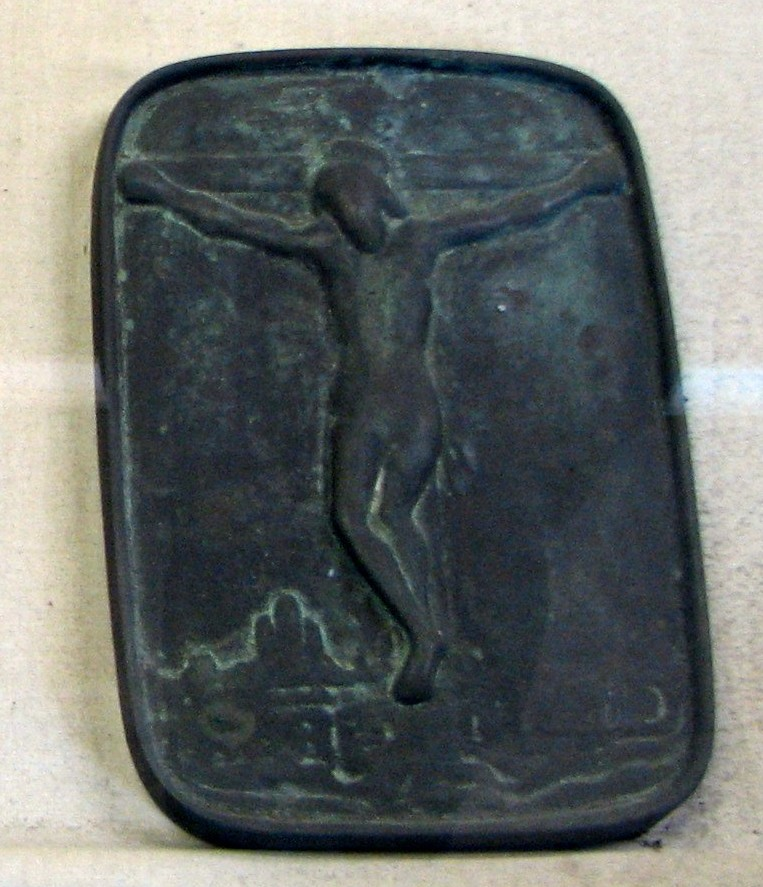
A picture of Jesus used to reveal practicing Catholics and sympathizers

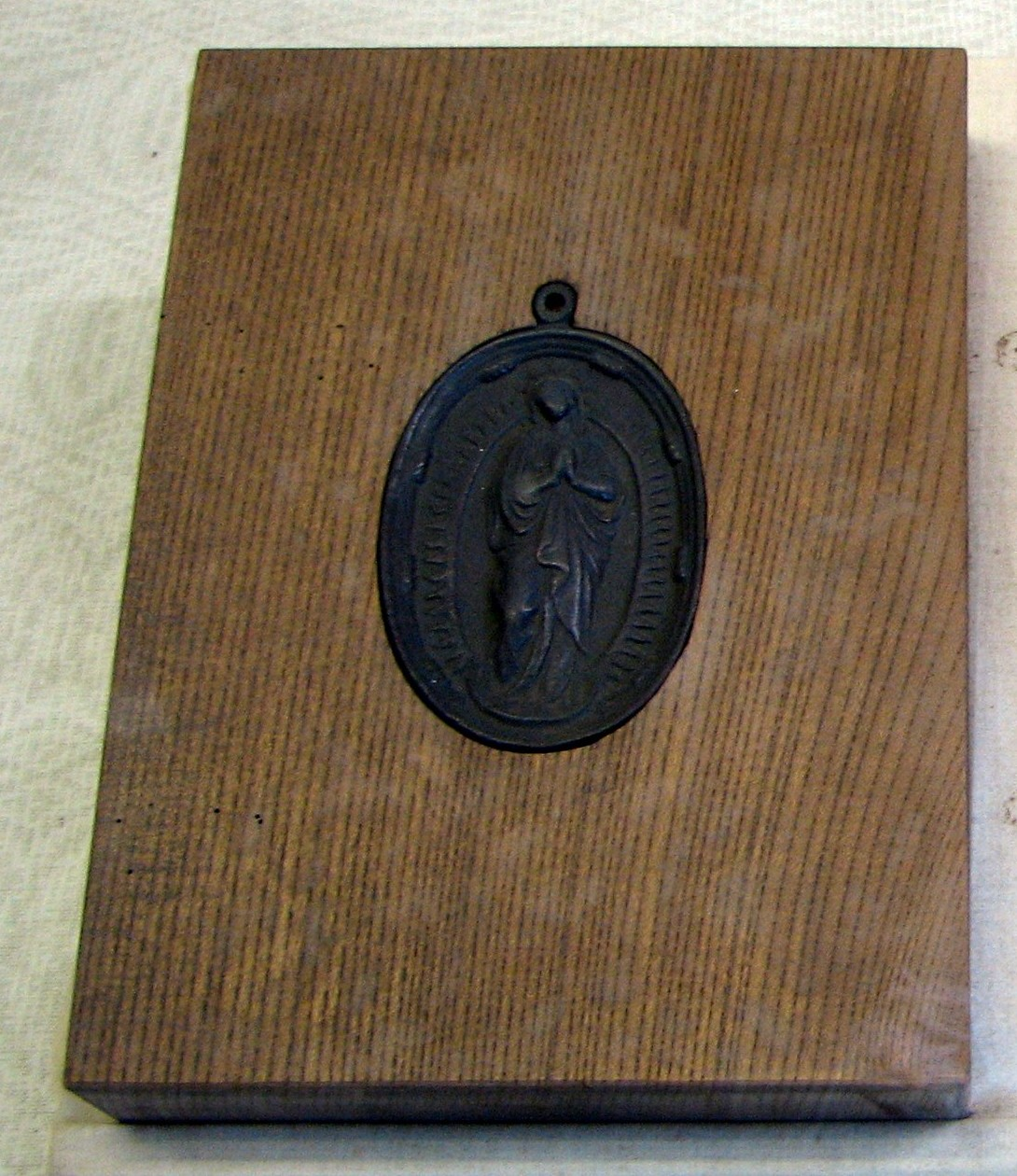
A picture of the Virgin Mary

A fumi-e (踏み絵, fumi "stepping-on" + e "picture") was a likeness of Jesus or Mary onto which the religious authorities of the Tokugawa shogunate of Japan required suspected Christians (Kirishitan) to step, in order to demonstrate that they were not members of the outlawed religion; otherwise they would be tortured or killed.

== History ==
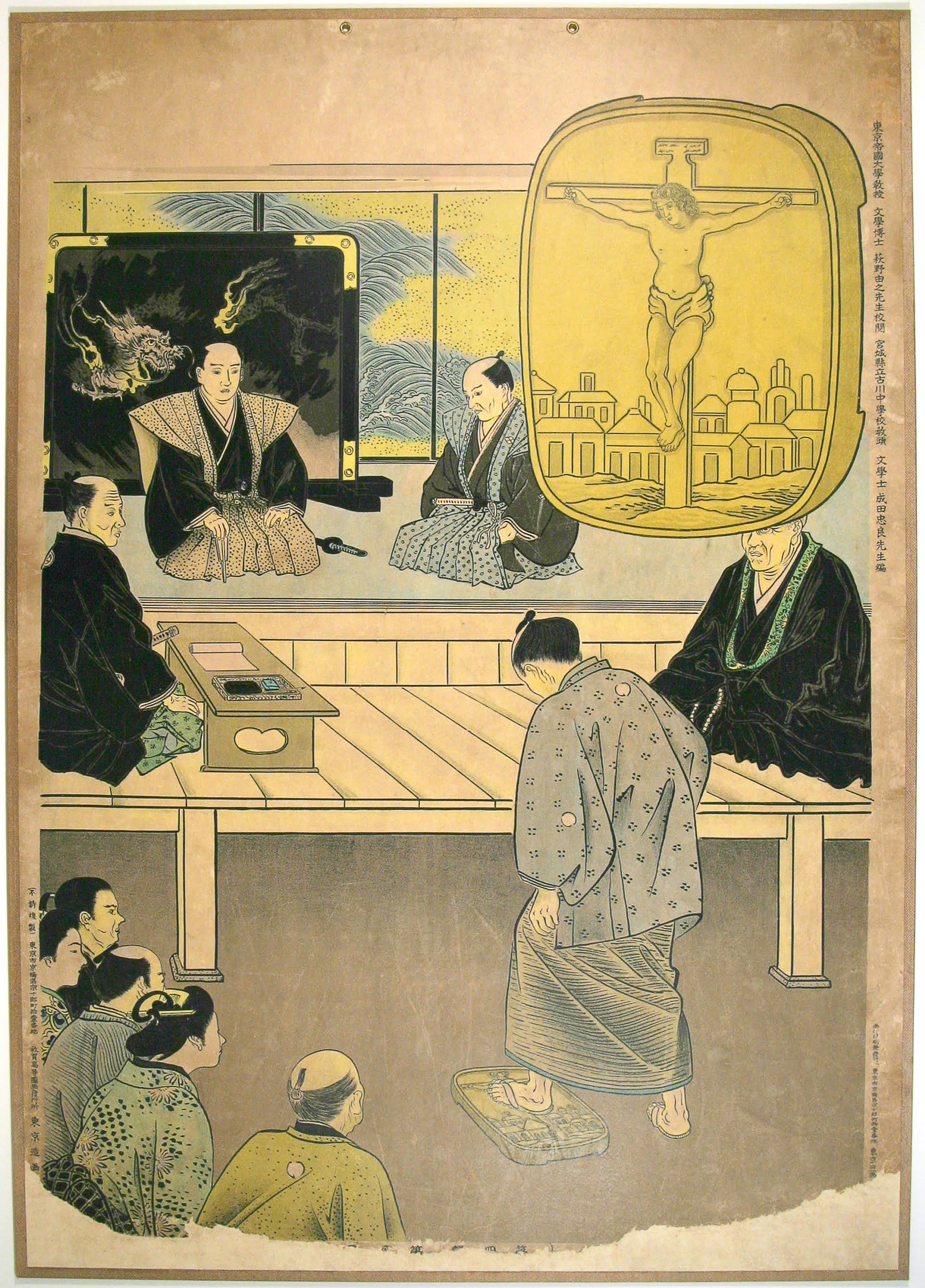
A Fumi-e to expose Christians by the Tokugawa Shogunate

Fumi-e began first to be used against Christians in Nagasaki in 1629. Residents of Nagasaki, whether commoner, Buddhist monk or samurai, were required to tread on the icons which were brought from house to house. Their use was officially abandoned when ports opened to foreigners on 13 April 1856, but some remained in use until Christian teaching was placed under formal protection during the Meiji era. The icons were also known as e-ita or ita-e. The forced test was called e-fumi.

The Japanese government used the e-fumi to uncover Christians and sympathizers. Fumi-e contained images of the Virgin Mary and Jesus, which government officials ordered all to trample on. Those who were reluctant or refused to do so were arrested for being Christians. The policy of the shogunate was to get them to abjure the faith. If they refused they would be tortured. If they still refused to abjure, they would be killed. Some executions took place at Nagasaki's Mount Unzen, where the Christians were boiled in the hot springs.

Execution for Christianity was unofficially abandoned by the Tokugawa Shogunate in 1805.

Eighteenth-century Europe was aware enough of e-fumi for authors of fiction to mention it when alluding to Japan, as in Jonathan Swift's Gulliver's Travels (1726), Oliver Goldsmith's The Citizen of the World (1760), and Voltaire's Candide (1759). Allegations published in Europe during the late 17th and early 18th century that Dutch traders at Dejima were required to undergo the e-fumi are thought by modern scholars to be propaganda arising from the Anglo–Dutch Wars.

In modern Japanese literature, treading on the fumi-e is a pivotal plot element of the novel Silence by Shūsaku Endō and the 2016 film of the same name.

Christians would sometimes perform the e-fumi yet continue to practice their beliefs secretly (Kakure Kirishitan); there were some 20,000 secret Christians in Japan when Christianity was legalized again, down from 500,000 in Nagasaki at the height of Japanese Christianity before the persecution. University of Auckland professor Mark Mullins concluded that "In that sense, the fumi-e policies were effective."

== Interpretations ==
Many theologians have tried to contemplate the role of the fumi-e to Japanese Christians, some seeing the treading of the fumi-e as a sign of the love and forgiveness of Jesus Christ.

Nagasaki Junshin Catholic University professor Simon Hull stated that if all of the fumi-e participants had instead chosen to be defiant and died, Christianity would not have continued in Japan; he stated "It is only because some made an existential decision to trample on the fumi-e, ... that Christianity in Japan was able to survive."

== Form ==
Fumi-e were usually cast from bronze. Others were made of painted stone and some were woodblock prints. There are relatively few surviving fumi-e, as most were simply thrown away or recycled for other uses. Some examples were displayed by the Smithsonian in their 2007 exhibition "Encompassing the Globe: Portugal and the World in the 16th and 17th Centuries." One example is on display at the Christian Museum in Nagoya ( 切支丹遺跡博物館 )

== See also ==
- Auto-da-fé
- Catholicism in Japan
- Holy Inquisition
- Martyrs of Japan
