= Deep River (novel) =

1993 novel by Shūsaku Endō

- First edition
- Author: Shūsaku Endō
- Original title: 深い河
- Set in: India
- Published: 1993

Deep River (深い河, Fukai kawa) is a novel by Shūsaku Endō published in 1993. When he died in 1996, the novel was one of only two chosen to be placed inside his coffin.

== Plot summary ==
The story traces the journey of four Japanese tourists on a tour of India in 1984. Each has different purposes and expectations. Even though the tour is interrupted when Prime Minister Indira Gandhi is assassinated by militant Sikhs, the tourists find their own spiritual discoveries on the banks of the Ganges River.

One of the tourists is Osamu Isobe. He is a middle-class manager whose wife has died of cancer. On her deathbed she asked him to look for her in a future reincarnation. His search takes him to India, even though he has doubts about reincarnation.

Kiguchi is haunted by wartime horrors in Burma and seeks to have Buddhist rituals performed in India for the souls of his friends in the Japanese army as well as his enemies. He is impressed by a foreign Christian volunteer who helped his sick friend deal with tragic experiences during the war.

Numada has a deep love for animals ever since he was a child in Manchuria. He believes that a pet bird he owns has died in his place. He goes to India to visit a bird sanctuary.

Mitsuko Naruse, after a failed marriage, realizes that she is a person incapable of love. She goes to India hoping to find the meaning of life. Her values are challenged by the awaiting Otsu, a former schoolmate she once cruelly seduced and then left. Although he had a promising career as a Catholic priest, Otsu’s heretical ideas of a pantheistic God have led to his expulsion. He helps carry dead Indians to the local crematoria so that their ashes can be spread over the Ganges. His efforts ultimately lead to his peril as he is caught up in the violent backlash aimed towards photojournalist Sanjo. Meanwhile, Mitsuko meets two nuns from the Missionaries of Charity and begins to understand Otsu's idea of God.

== Characters ==
- Osamu Isobe, a middle manager who looks for a girl named Rajini Puniral, the potential reincarnation of his dead wife.
- Mitsuko Naruse, a former housewife who takes a trip as a pilgrimage and also to see her ex-boyfriend Otsu, as atonement for mistreating him
- Mr. Numada, a bird watcher who wants to set a bird in his possession free.
- Mr. Kiguchi, a former WWII Imperial Japanese Army soldier.
- Mr. Enami, the tour guide.
- Mr. Sanjo, a photojournalist on honeymoon with his wife.
- Mrs. Sanjo, his vapid new wife.
- Augustine Otsu, Mitsuko's former boyfriend, now a Catholic priest in Varanasi.

== Film adaptation ==
A film based on the novel (also named Fukai kawa) was made in 1995. It was directed by Kei Kumai. The film stars Kumiko Akiyoshi as Mitsuko, Eiji Okuda as Otsu, Hisashi Igawa as Isobe, Yoichi Numata as Kiguchi, and Tetta Sugimoto as Enami. Kyōko Kagawa plays Mrs. Isobe in flashbacks, while Numada becomes Tsukada, played by Toshiro Mifune, and Kin Sugai plays his wife.
