= Shūsaku Endō =

Japanese writer (1923–1996)

Shūsaku Endō KCSS
- 遠藤 周作
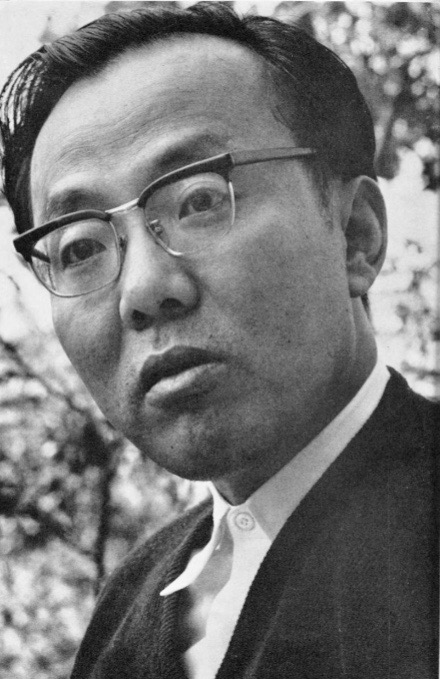
- Endō in 1966
- Born: March 27, 1923; Tokyo, Japan
- Died: September 29, 1996 (aged 73); Tokyo, Japan
- Education: Keio University
- Occupation: Novelist
- Spouse: Junko Okada (m. 1955)
- Children: 1
- Writing career
- Notable work: Silence (1966)
- Notable awards: Akutagawa Prize (1955); Tanizaki Prize (1966); Noma Prize (1980)
- Movement: Third Generation

Shūsaku Endō (遠藤 周作, Endō Shūsaku; March 27, 1923 – September 29, 1996) was a Japanese writer who wrote from the perspective of a Japanese Catholic. Internationally, he is known for his 1966 historical fiction novel Silence, adapted into a 2016 film by Martin Scorsese. He was a laureate of several prestigious literary accolades, including the Akutagawa Prize and the Order of Culture, and was inducted into the Roman Catholic Order of St. Sylvester by Pope Paul VI.

Together with Junnosuke Yoshiyuki, Shōtarō Yasuoka, Junzo Shono, Hiroyuki Agawa, Ayako Sono (also Catholic), and Shumon Miura, Endō is categorized as part of the "Third Generation" (that is, the third major group of Japanese writers to appear after World War II).

== Biography ==
Soon after Endō was born in Tokyo in 1923, his family moved to Dairen, then part of the Kwantung Leased Territory in Manchuria. When his parents divorced in 1933, Endō's mother brought him back to Japan to live with an aunt in Kobe. Endō was baptized as a Catholic at the age of 11 or 12 in 1934. Some say this was brought on by his mother, who had converted to Catholicism after her divorce, while others state the aunt instigated the initiation.

Endō first attended Waseda University for the stated purpose of studying medicine, but later decided to switch to the literature programme at Keio University. His studies were interrupted by the war, during which he worked in a munitions factory and also contributed to literary journals. In 1968, he would later become chief editor of one of these, the prestigious Mita Bungaku.

Endō was among the first Japanese university students to study in France. His studies at the University of Lyon over the 1950–1953 period deepened his interest in and knowledge of modern French Catholic authors, who were to become a major influence on his own writing.

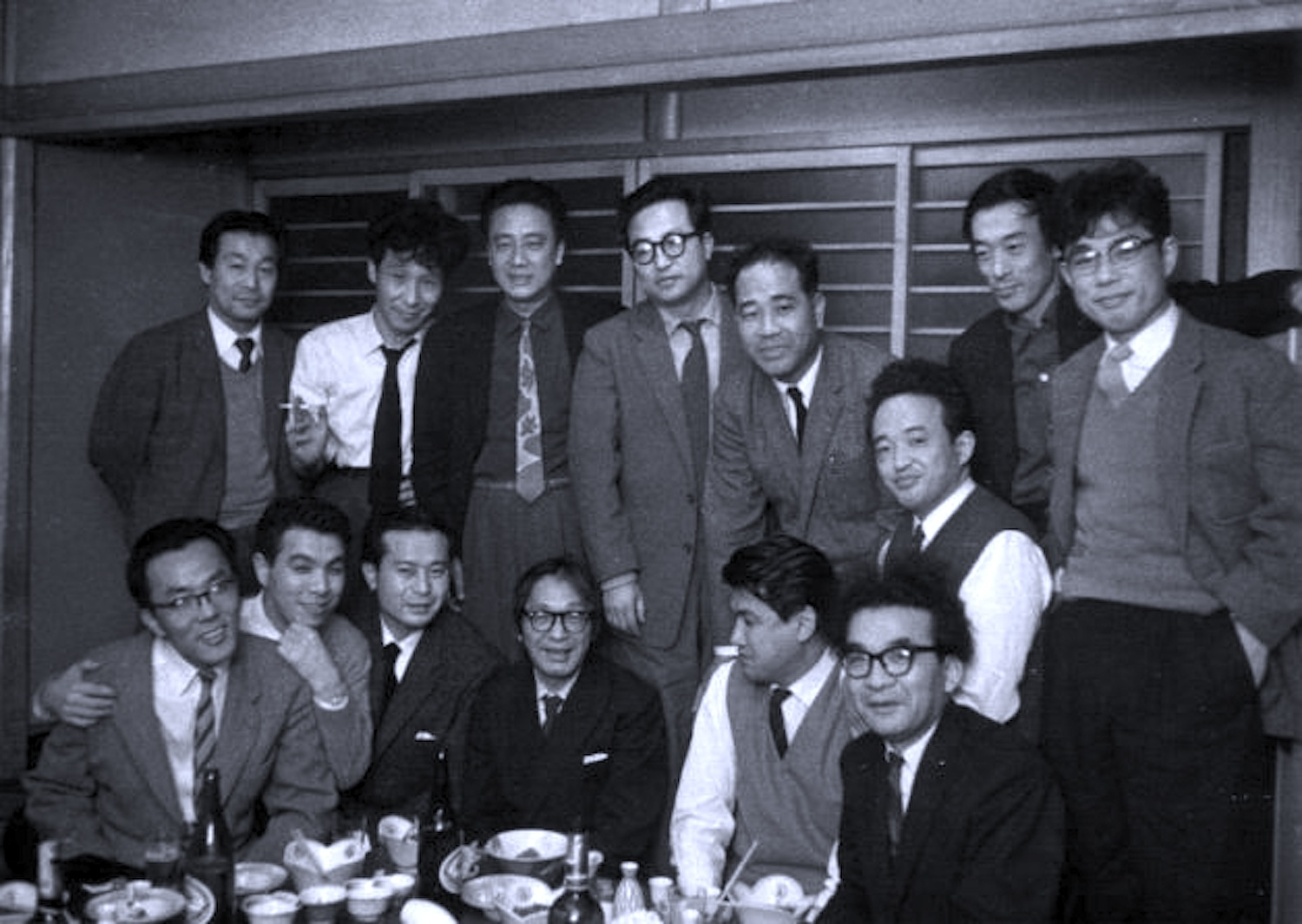
Endo, seated, far left, with other Japanese literati in 1954

Upon his return to Japan, his success as a writer was almost immediate. In 1954, a year after completing his studies in France, he won the Akutagawa Prize for Shiroi Hito (White Men).

Endō married Okada Junko in 1955. They had one son, Ryūnosuke, born in 1956.

Endō lectured at at least two Tokyo universities. In 1956, he was hired as an instructor at Sophia University, and Seijo University assigned him the role of "Lecturer on the Theory of the Novel" in 1967. He was considered a novelist not a university professor, however.

Throughout his life bouts of disease plagued him, and he spent two years in hospital at one point. In 1952, while studying in France, he came down with pleurisy in Paris. A return visit in 1960 prompted another case of the same disease, and he stayed in hospital (in France and Japan) for the greater part of three years. Among other health problems, he contracted tuberculosis, underwent thoracoplasty, and had a lung removed.

While he lost the 1994 Nobel Prize in Literature to Kenzaburō Ōe, he received the Order of Culture the subsequent year. Endō died shortly thereafter from complications of hepatitis at Keio University Hospital in Tokyo on September 29, 1996.

== Writing style and themes ==
While Endō wrote in several genres, his oeuvre is strongly tied to Christianity. Endō has been called "a novelist whose work has been dominated by a single theme ... belief in Christianity". Others have said that he is "almost by default ... [labeled] a 'Japanese Catholic author' struggling to 'plant the seeds of his adopted religion' in the 'mudswamp' of Japan". He often likened Japan to a swamp or fen. In the novel Silence, an official tells a priest who has apostatized, "Father, it was not by us that you were defeated, but by this mudswamp, Japan." In Endō's stage version of this story, The Golden Country, this official also says: "But the mudswamp too has its good points, if you will but give yourself up to its comfortable warmth. The teachings of Christ are like a flame. Like a flame they set a man on fire. But the tepid warmth of Japan will eventually nurture sleep." Thus, many of Endō's characters are allegories.

Some Christian critics have looked askance at Endō's works—for example, as portraying historical Japanese Christian martyrs in too negative a light—but others have embraced him, with positive assessments in Catholic and Christian journals and the award of an honorary degree from the Jesuit John Carroll University—the first the institution had ever bestowed upon an author.

While not the main focus of his works, a few of Endō's books mention Kakure Kirishitans (hidden Christians), though Endō preferred to use the term "かくれ切支丹" instead of the more common "かくれキリシタン". Some of his characters (many of whom are allegories) may reference non-Western religions.

His books reflect many of his childhood experiences, including the stigma of being an outsider, the experience of being a foreigner, the life of a hospital patient, and the struggle with tuberculosis. However, his books mainly deal with the moral fabric of life; most of his characters struggle with complex moral dilemmas, and their choices often produce mixed or tragic results.

His Catholic faith can be seen at some level in all of his books, and it is often a central feature. His work is often compared to that of Graham Greene, with whom he shared a mutual admiration: Greene himself labeled Endō one of the finest writers alive, while it is reported that Endo would re-read Greene's novel The End of the Affair before beginning a new work of his own.

== Partial list of works ==
- Aden made (アデンまで, "To Aden"): Published in the November 1954 issue of Mita Bungaku, a literary journal of Tokyo's Keio University.
- 白い人 (White Man) (1955)
- 黄色い人 (Yellow Man) (1955): A novella in the form of a letter written by a young man, no longer a practising Catholic, to his former pastor, a French missionary.
- 海と毒薬 (The Sea and Poison) (1957): Set largely in a Fukuoka hospital during World War II, this novel is concerned with medical experimentation carried out on downed American airmen. It is written with alternating points of view: the bulk of the story is written with a subjective, limited (but shifting) third-person view; three segments are told in first-person view. Inspired by true events, this novel was made into the 1986 movie The Sea and Poison. Directed by Kei Kumai, it stars Eiji Okuda and Ken Watanabe.
- おバカさん (Wonderful Fool) (1959): A story about a kind, innocent, and naïve Frenchman visiting post-war Tokyo. Gaston Bonaparte is a Christ-like figure who comes to live with a Japanese family. He befriends a variety of "undesirables" including stray dogs, prostitutes, and a killer. In spite of this unusual behavior he changes everyone he meets for the better.
- 十一の色硝子 (Stained Glass Elegies) (1959): Translated to English in 1984.
- 火山 (Volcano) (1960): A novel concerning three declining figures: an apostate Catholic priest, the director of a weather station in provincial Japan, and the volcano on which the latter is an expert.
- 私が棄てた女 (The Girl I Left Behind) (1964): A story of a young man and his mismatches with an innocent young woman. As Endō writes in the foreword to the English translation, one of the characters has a connection with Otsu, a character in Endo's later novel Deep River.
- Ryūgaku (留学, "Foreign Studies") (1965) Three linked narratives chart the gulf between East and West. Evoking Paris in the 1960s, 17th century Rome, and provincial France in the post-World War II years, Endō acutely conveys the alienation felt by three Japanese students when confronted by the spiritual values and culture of Europe.
- 沈黙 (Silence) (1966): Winner of the Tanizaki Prize and Endō's most famous work, it is generally regarded as his masterpiece. Silence has been published in English by Peter Owen Publishers, London. This historical novel tells the story of a Catholic missionary priest in early 17th century Japan, who apostatizes to save the lives of several people, and then becomes a retainer of the local lord, but continues to keep the Christian faith in private. The character is based on the historical figure of Giuseppe Chiara.
  - The book inspired the feature film adaptations Silence (1971) by Masahiro Shinoda, Os Olhos da Ásia (1996) by Portuguese film director João Mário Grilo, and Silence (2016) by Martin Scorsese. The last of these was premiered in Vatican City on November 29, 2016, and was released in the United States on December 23, 2016.
- The Golden Country (1966): A play featuring many of the characters who appear in the novel Silence.
- Kuronbō (黒ん坊) (1971): A satirical novel inspired by the historical figure of Yasuke, a 16th-century African man who served as a retinue and weapons-bearer under the daimyo Oda Nobunaga. The novel's title is a Japanese racial slur for Black people, equivalent to the word "nigger" in English.
- 死海のほとり ("Banks of the Dead Sea") (1973)
- イエスの生涯 (Life of Jesus) (1973)
- 口笛をふく時 (When I Whistle) (1974)
- 鉄の首枷 - 小西行長伝 (Iron Collar - The Story of Konishi Yukinaga) (1977): The biography of Konishi Yukinaga, Toyotomi Hideyoshi's Christian protege, who got caught between Christianity and the samurai code demanding blind obedience to his anti-Christian master.
- 王妃マリーアントワネット (Marie Antoinette) (1979): This book inspired the musical Marie Antoinette by German musical dramatist and lyricist Michael Kunze.
- 侍 (The Samurai) (1980): A historical novel set in the 17th century relating the diplomatic mission of a group of samurai, including the protagonist Hasekura Tsunenaga, together with a Spanish missionary, Pedro Velasco, to travel to the Western world: Mexico, Spain, and eventually Rome. Velasco hopes to become primate of Catholic Japan, and his mission is to bargain for a crusade to Japan in return for trading rights.
- 女の一生：キクの場合 (Kiku's Prayer) (1982): A novel set during the final period of Christian persecutions in Japan in the 1860s.
- 女の一生 (Sachiko) (1982): A novel set in Nagasaki during the years between 1930 and 1945 about two young people trying to find love and dealing with their Catholic faith in a period where Japanese Christians were accused of treason disloyalty to their country and Emperor.
- 私の愛した小説 (Novels Loved by Me) & 本当の私を求めて (Search for the Real Me) (1985)
- スキャンダル (Scandal) (1986): Set in Tokyo, the book is about a novelist who comes face to face with a doppelgänger of himself, who engages in lewd sexual activity. While the protagonist attempts to find his "impostor", a journalist dogs the author, searching for a scoop.
- 深い河 (Deep River) (1993): Set in India, it chronicles the physical and spiritual journey of a group of five Japanese tourists who are facing a wide range of moral and spiritual dilemmas. Working among the poor, sick, and dying, one of the group finds the man that she seduced long ago at college in an attempt to undermine his faith.
- The Final Martyrs: A series of eleven short stories published in Japan between 1959 and 1985. Translated into English in 2008.

== Awards ==
- 1955 Akutagawa Prize – White Men (白い人, Shiroi Hito)
- 1966 Tanizaki Prize – Silence (沈黙, Chinmoku)
- 1971 Order of St. Sylvester
- 1980 Noma Literary Prize – The Samurai (侍)
- 1995 Order of Culture (文化勲章)

== Museum ==
The Shusaku Endo Literature Museum, in Sotome, Nagasaki, is devoted to the writer's life and works.

== See also ==
- Catholic Church in Japan
- Van C. Gessel (translator)

== Bibliography ==
- Morton, Leith (November 1994). The Image of Christ in the Fiction of Endō Shūsaku. Working Papers in Japanese Studies. Vol. 8. Japanese Studies Center, Monash University, Australia.
- Miller, Scott J. (2009). Historical Dictionary of Modern Japanese Literature and Theater. Scarecrow Press. ISBN 978-0-8108-6319-4.
- Williams, Mark B. (June 21, 1999). Endō Shūsaku: a literature of reconciliation. Routledge. ISBN 978-0-415-14481-0.
