= João Mário Grilo =

Portuguese film director, author, and professor

- Born: João Mário Lourenço Bagão Grilo; 8 November 1958 (age 67); Figueira da Foz, Portugal
- Education: NOVA University of Lisbon
- Occupations: Filmmaker, screenwriter, film scholar, university professor, writer
- Years active: 1978-

João Mário Lourenço Bagão Grilo (born 8 November 1958) is a Portuguese film director, author and professor, born in Figueira da Foz. He attended economics at the University of Coimbra but dropped out. In 1983, he graduated in sociology at Lisbon's ISCTE and in 1994 earned a Ph.D. in communication sciences from the NOVA University Lisbon. He is a full professor in the Department of Communication Studies at the NOVA University Lisbon, where, among other courses, he teaches Filmology and Film Direction.

His first long feature film won the Georges Sadoul Prize at the Venice Film Festival.

== Filmography ==
- Maria, 1978-9 (Maria)
- A Estrangeira, 1982 (The Foreigner)
- O Processo do Rei, 1989 (The King's Trial)
- O Fim do Mundo, 1992 (The End of the World)
- Saramago: Documentos, 1994 (Saramago: Documents)
- Os Olhos da Ásia, 1996 (The Eyes of Asia)
- Longe da Vista, 1998 (Out of Sight)
- 451 Forte, 2000 (451 Forte)
- A Falha, 2002 (The Rift)
- Prova de Contacto, 2003 (Contact Proof)
- O Tapete Voador, 2005 (The Flying Carpet)
- Duas Mulheres, 2009 (Two Women)
- A Vossa Casa, 2012 (Your Home)
- O Grande Auditório - Memorial de uma Obra, 2014
- Viagem aos Confins de um Sítio Onde Nunca Estive (on the work of sculptor Rui Chafes), 2014
- A Vossa Terra, 2016 (Your Land)
- Não Esquecerás, 2016 (You Won't Forget) [short]
- Correspondencia íntima, 2021

== Writing (selection) ==
- "Monologues du Cinéma (A 'Course in Treatment' de S.M. Eisenstein, 1949)", in Trafic, nr. 100 (Hiver 2016)
- Cinema & Filosofia: Compêndio (ed.). Lisboa: Colibri, 2014 (Cinema and Philosophy. A Compedium)
- "Propositions for a Gestural Cinema," in H. Gustafsson and A. Gronstad (eds.), Cinema and Agamben. Ethics, Biopolitics, and the Moving Image. NY: Bloomsbury, 2014
- O Livro das Imagens. Coimbra: Minerva, 2007 (The Book of Images)
- O Homem Imaginado: Cinema, Acção, Pensamento. Lisboa: Livros Horizonte, 2006 (The Imagined Man: cinema, action, thought)
- As Lições do Cinema. Manual de Filmologia. Lisboa: Colibri, 2006 (The Lessons of Cinema)
- O Cinema da Não-Ilusão: Histórias para o Cinema Português. Lisboa: Livros Horizonte, 2006 (The Cinema of Non-illusion: histories for the Portuguese cinema)
- A Ordem no Cinema: Vozes e Palavras de Ordem no Estabelecimento do Cinema em Hollywood. Lisboa: Relógio d'Agua, 1997 (The Order in Cinema: voices and watchwords on the establishment of cinema in Hollywood)
