= Miyakonojō City Museum of Art =

Museum in Miyakonojō, Miyazaki, Japan

- 都城市立美術館
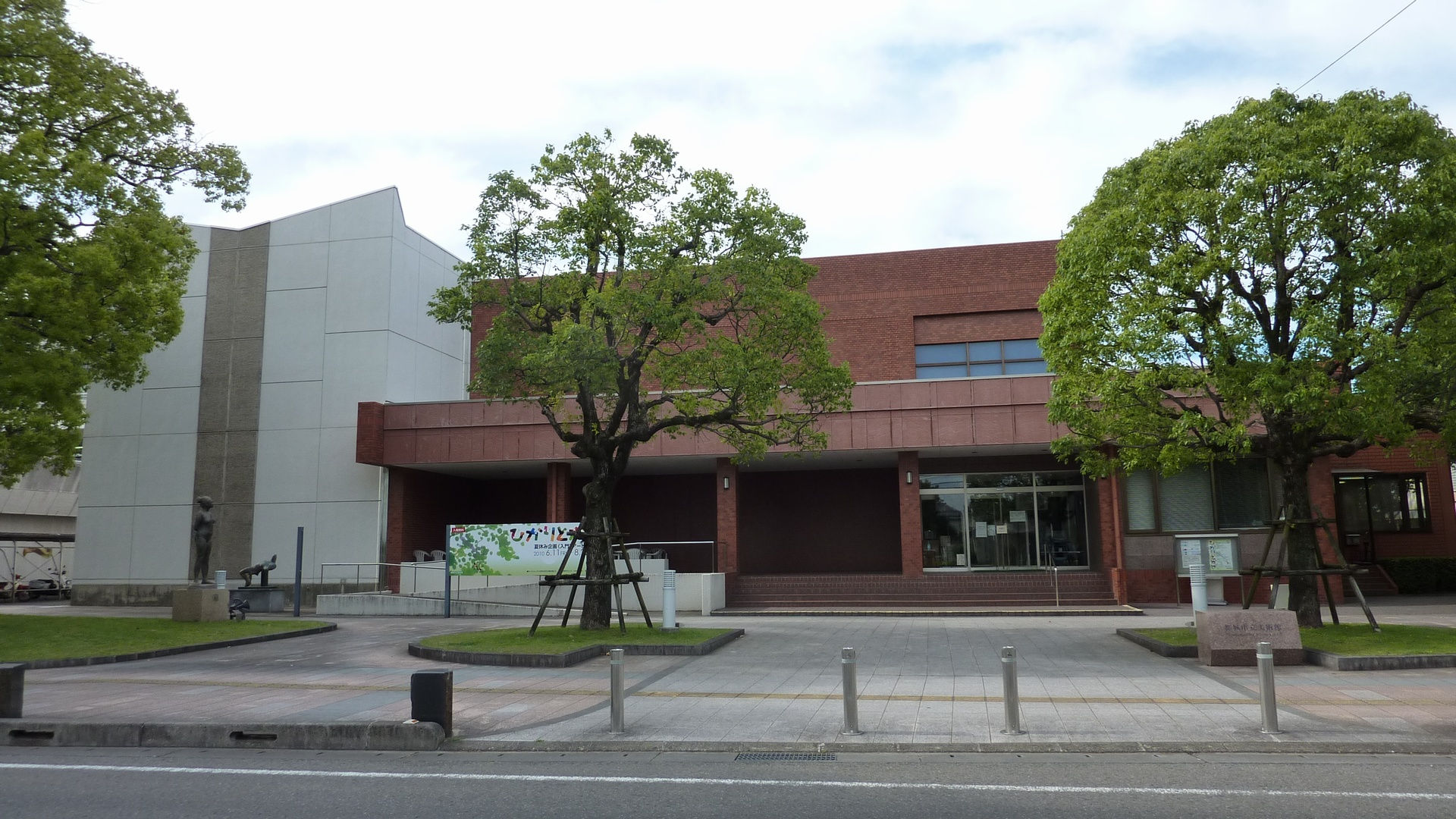
- Interactive map of the Miyakonojō City Museum of Art area

General information
- Location: 7-18 Himegi-chō, Miyakonojō, Miyazaki Prefecture, Japan
- Coordinates: 31°43′09″N 131°03′47″E
- Opened: November 1981

Website
- Official website (in Japanese)

Miyakonojō City Museum of Art (都城市立美術館, Miyakonojō Shiritsu Bijutsukan) opened in Miyakonojō, Miyazaki Prefecture, Japan in 1981. The collection includes works by Yamauchi Tamon, Masuda Gyokujō, and Yamada Shin'ichi, and temporary exhibitions are also mounted.

== See also ==
- Miyazaki Prefectural Art Museum
- Ōshima Hatakeda Site
- Imamachi ichirizuka
