= Honjō Kofun Cluster =

Honjō Kofun cluster
- 本庄古墳群 (Japanese)
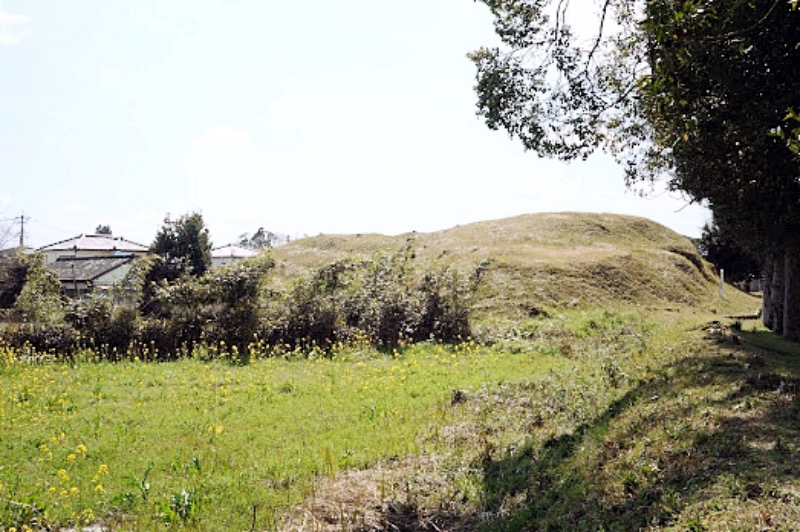
- Honjō Kofun No.28

- Honjō Kofun cluster Honjō Kofun Cluster (Japan)
- Interactive map of Honjō Kofun cluster
- 31°59′20″N 131°19′29″E
- Type: kofun
- Periods: Kofun period
- Location: Kunitomi, Miyazaki, Japan
- Region: Kyushu

History
- Built: c. 3rd to 5th century AD

Site notes
- Public access: No facilities

The Honjō Kofun Cluster (本庄古墳群) is a group of Kofun period burial mounds located in the Honjō neighborhood of the town of Kunitomi, Miyazaki Prefecture in Kyushu Japan. The tumulus group was designated a National Historic Site of Japan in 1934.

== Overview ==
The Honjō Kofun Cluster is located on the Honjō Plateau at an elevation of about 40 meters, in an area extending approximately three kilometers from east-to-west and about one kilometer north-to-south, sandwiched between the Honjō River and Fukunen River, which are tributaries of the Ōyodo River. These tumuli date from the late 4th century to the 6th century. When designated a National Historic Site in 1934, the cluster consisted of 57 kofun: 17 zenpō-kōen-fun (前方後円墳), which are shaped like a keyhole, having one square end and one circular end, when viewed from above, 37 empun (円墳)-style round tombs, two horizontal corridor cave-tombs, and one "vertical corridor burial chamber", which is a style unique to Kyushu. Kofun No. 37 is a zenpō-kōen-fun with a total length of 73 meters, and the other keyhole-shaped tombs are also between 50 and 60 meters in length. Most keyhole-shaped tombs are built with the main axis oriented east-west, with the front facing west. Only cylindrical haniwa has been collected from Kofun No. 42, but the other tumuli have not been investigated. Some of the tumuli have local names, such as "Yoroizuka", "Kenzuka", and "Kutsuwazuka", indicating that at some point in the past, these burial mounds were robbed and grave goods found within included such items as armor and iron swords.

Per local legend, during the Kofun period this area was ruled by the Ushimori clan, who claimed descent from Prince Kunitomi, a grandson of Emperor Keikō, and these tumuli were claimed to be the graves of the successive clan chieftains. However, no archaeological excavations have confirmed the full extent of the tombs.

== See also ==
- List of Historic Sites of Japan (Miyazaki)
