= Mukasa Castle =

- 穆佐城
- Miyazaki, Miyazaki, Japan

Site information
- Type: Hirayama-style Japanese castle
- Open to the public: yes
- Condition: Ruins

Location
- Mukasa Castle Mukasa Castle (Japan)
- Coordinates: 31°55′59.9″N 131°19′54.6″E

Site history
- Built: c.1336
- In use: Nanboku-cho-Sengoku period
- Demolished: 1615
- National Historic Site of Japan

Mukasa Castle (穆佐城, Mukasa-jō) was a Japanese castle located in the Takaoka neighborhood of what is now the city of Miyazaki, Miyazaki Prefecture, in southeastern Kyushu, Japan. Its ruins have been protected by the central government as a National Historic Site since 2002. It was also called Musain High Castle (穆佐院高城, Musain-Takajō). It is one of the 48 castles controlled by the Itō clan in Hyūga Province in the Sengoku period.

== History ==
The Mukasa Castle ruins are located on a low hill at an elevation of approximately 60 meters on the right bank of the upper reaches of the Ōyodo River.

During the Nanboku-chō period, this area came under the direct control of Ashikaga Takauji, who built the castle as his stronghold in Hyūga Province. It is uncertain when this location was first fortified, but it first appears in the historical record in a letter issued in 1336 by Itō Sukehiro, who was on the site of the Southern Court. Hatakeyama Naoaki, the shugo of Hyūga Province who was dispatched to Kyushu by order of Ashikaga Takauji, used Mukasa Castle as a base for the Northern Court and expanded his influence into Ōsumi Province, but after that, a new power struggle between the Shimazu clan and the Itō clan started. In 1403 the castle was taken by Shimazu Hisatoyo, the 8th chieftain of the Shimazu clan. He was subsequently defeated, and the castle returned to the control of the Itō clan, in whose hands it remained from 1445 until the defeat of the clan in 1577. It then reverted to the Shimazu clan, but was demolished in 1615 in accordance with the Tokugawa shogunate's restrictions on the number of castles per domain in 1615.

The castle consists of four enclosures extending east-to-west, each of which is divided by large-scale moats and has strong earthworks. The inner bailey, located at the highest point within the castle, is protected by particularly large ditches and earthworks, and pillar holes and ceramics dating from the 14th to 16th centuries have been detected.

The castle site is located on the mountain west of the current Musa Elementary School.

== See also ==
- List of Historic Sites of Japan (Miyazaki)

== Literature ==
- De Lange, William (2021). An Encyclopedia of Japanese Castles. Groningen: Toyo Press. pp. 600 pages. ISBN 978-9492722300.
- Schmorleitz, Morton S. (1974). Castles in Japan. Tokyo: Charles E. Tuttle Co. pp. 144–145. ISBN 0-8048-1102-4.
- Turnbull, Stephen (2003). Japanese Castles 1540-1640. Osprey Publishing. p. 64 pages. ISBN 1-84176-429-9.
