= List of historic sites of Japan (Miyazaki) =

This list is of the historic sites of Japan located within the Prefecture of Miyazaki.

== National Historic Sites ==
As of 1 July 2019, twenty-three Sites have been designated as being of national significance (including one *Special Historic Site).

Site	Municipality	Comments	Image	Coordinates	Type	Ref.
*Saitobaru Kofun Cluster 西都原古墳群 Saitobaru kofun-gun	Saito	Kofun period tumulus cluster	Saitobaru Kofun Cluster	32°06′41″N 131°23′07″E	1	2918
Yasui Sokken 安井息軒旧宅 Yasui Sokuken kyū-taku	Miyazaki	Bakumatsu period Confucian scholar residence	Yasui Sokken Former Residence	31°51′45″N 131°23′33″E	8	2959
Imamachi ichirizuka 今町一里塚 Ima-machi ichirizuka	Miyakonojō	Edo period mile marker	Yasui Sokken Former Residence	31°40′40″N 131°01′56″E	6	2925
Sadowara Castle ruins 佐土原城跡 Sadowara-jō ato	Miyazaki	Sengoku period castle ruins	Sadowara Castle ruins	32°02′52″N 131°25′26″E	2	3450
Mochida Kofun Cluster 持田古墳群 Mochida kofun-gun	Takanabe	Kofun period tumulus cluster	Mochida Kofun Cluster	32°08′32″N 131°31′47″E	1	2950
Sōrinbaru kuyōtō 宗麟原供養塔 Sōrinbaru kuyōtō	Kawaminami	Sengoku period memorial stupa	Sōrinbaru kuyōtō	32°10′15″N 131°28′58″E	7	2912
Matsumotozuka Kofun 松本塚古墳 Matsumotozuka kofun	Saito	Kofun period tumulus	Matsumotozuka Kofun	32°06′08″N 131°31′47″E	1	2934
Jōshinzuka Kofun 常心塚古墳 Jōshinzuka kofun	Saito	Kofun period tumulus	Jōshinzuka Kofun	32°04′23″N 131°19′34″E	1	2960
Nyūtabaru Kofun Cluster 新田原古墳群 Nyūtabaru kofun-gun	Shintomi, Saito	Kofun period tumulus cluster	Nyūtabaru Kofuncluster	32°04′47″N 131°25′50″E	1	2936
Ikime Kofun Cluster 生目古墳群 Ikime kofun-gun	Miyazaki	Kofun period tumulus cluster	Ikime Kofun cluster	31°57′01″N 131°23′09″E	1	2932
Chibatake Kofun 千畑古墳 Chibatake kofun	Saito	Kofun period tumulus		32°08′24″N 131°24′07″E	1	2917
Kawaminami Kofun Cluster 川南古墳群 Kawaminami kofun-gun	Kawaminami	Kofun period tumulus cluster	Kawaminami Kofun Cluster	32°10′24″N 131°29′48″E	1	2951
Ōshima Hatakeda Site 大島畠田遺跡 Ōshima Hatakeda iseki	Miyakonojō	Heian-period settlement		31°46′18″N 131°04′31″E	1	3328
Chausubaru Kofun Cluster 茶臼原古墳群 Chausubaru kofun-gun	Saito	Kofun period tumulus cluster	Chausubaru Kofun Cluster	32°08′36″N 131°24′51″E	1	2956
Nakanooku Stele 中ノ尾供養碑 Nakanooku yōhi	Nichinan	Sengoku period memorial monument	Nakanooku Stele	31°38′23″N 131°22′02″E	7	2921
Tonokōri Castle ruins 都於郡城跡 Tonokōri-jō ato	Saito	Muromachi-Sengoku period castle ruins		32°03′40″N 131°22′25″E	2	3266
Minamikata Kofun Cluster 南方古墳群 Minamikata kofun-gun	Nobeoka	Kofun period tumulus cluster		32°34′22″N 131°37′49″E	1	2933
Hyūga Provincial Capital ruins 日向国府跡 Hyūga Kokufu ato	Saito	Nara period kokufu of Hyūga Province	Hyūga Kokubun-ji ruins	32°06′52″N 131°24′04″E	2	00003459
Hyūga Kokubun-ji ruins 日向国分寺跡 Hyūga Kokubunji ato	Saito	Nara period provincial temple of Hyūga Province	Hyūga Kokubun-ji ruins	32°06′08″N 131°23′48″E	3	00003720
Mukasa Castle ruins 穆佐城跡 Mukasa-jō ato	Miyazaki	Muromachi - Sengoku period castle ruins		31°56′00″N 131°19′22″E	2	3329
Honjō Kofun Cluster 本庄古墳群 Honjō kofun-gun	Kunitomi	Kofun period tumuli cluster	Honjō Kofun Cluster	31°59′20″N 131°19′29″E	1	2922
Motonobaru Site 本野原遺跡 Motonobaru iseki	Miyazaki	Jomon period settlement site		31°49′22″N 131°16′57″E	1	3410
Hasugaike Kofun Cluster 蓮ヶ池横穴群 Hasugaike yokoana-gun	Miyazaki	Kofun period cave tombs	Hasugaike Kofun Cluster	31°58′09″N 131°26′44″E	1	2955

== Prefectural Historic Sites ==
As of 1 May 2018, one hundred and nine Sites have been designated as being of prefectural importance.

Site	Municipality	Comments	Image	Coordinates	Type	Ref.
Enokida Barrier Site 榎田関跡; Enokida seki ato	Ebino			32°04′09″N 130°48′42″E		
Sarukawa Barrier Site 去川の関跡; Sarukawa no seki ato	Miyazaki			31°54′59″N 131°13′45″E		
Swordsmith Tanaka Kunihiro Residence Site 刀工田中国広宅跡 tōkō Tanaka Kunihiro taku ato	Aya			31°59′16″N 131°15′35″E		
Honjō Stone Buddhas 木庄の石仏; Honjō no sekibutsu	Kunitomi			31°58′41″N 131°18′24″E		
Tanimura Keisuke Former Residence 谷村計介旧宅; Tanimura Keisuke kyū-taku	Miyazaki			31°57′24″N 131°21′36″E		
Nanshū Ōgū Residence Site 南州翁寓居跡; Nanshū Ōgū kyo ato	Nobeoka			32°39′09″N 131°41′19″E		
Yoshino Southern Court Shibahara Matazaburō Grave 吉野朝勤王家柴原又三郎の墓; Yoshino-chō kinnōka Shibahara Matazaburō no haka	Takachiho			32°42′19″N 131°15′46″E		
Zen Master Kogetsu Funerary Tower 古月禅師分骨塔; Kogetsu zenji bunkōtō	Miyazaki	in the grounds of Daikō-ji (大光寺)		32°02′51″N 131°26′06″E		
Kakin Kitsu Grave 何欽吉墓; Kakin Kitsu bo	Miyakonojō			31°43′41″N 131°02′57″E		
Itō Clan Graves 伊東塚; Itōzuka	Kobayashi			31°59′56″N 130°58′29″E		
Bakumatsu Loyalists' Graves 幕末勤王家海賀宮門外二士の墓; Bakumatsu kinnō-ka Kaiga Kyūmon hoka ni shi no haka	Hyūga	three samurai killed in an incident on 8 May 1862		32°25′29″N 131°40′50″E		
Kai Uzen Grave 甲斐右膳父子の墓; Kai Uzen fushi no haka	Nishimera			32°11′17″N 131°14′37″E		
Iwayoshi Gosho Site 祝吉御所跡; Iwayoshi-gosho ato	Miyakonojō			31°44′20″N 131°05′57″E		
Kamiyaikenohara Ichirizuka 紙屋池の原一里塚; Kamiyaikenohara ichirizuka	Kobayashi			31°57′32″N 131°09′44″E		
Kamiyaurushinobaru Ichirizuka 紙屋漆野原一里塚; Kamiyaurushinobaru ichirizuka	Kobayashi			31°58′19″N 131°11′48″E		
Former Domain Tsuno Horse Corral Site 旧藩都農牧駒追込場跡 kyū-han Tsuno makikoma oikomiba ato	Tsuno			32°16′25″N 131°34′32″E		
Arisugawa Taruhito Temporary Residence 有栖川征討総督宮殿下御本営遺跡; Arisugawa seitō sōtoku no miya denka gohonei iseki	Hyūga			32°25′31″N 131°39′35″E		
Monk Nichō Grave 僧日要の墓 sō Nichō no haka	Hyūga			32°25′32″N 131°40′04″E		
Monk Nikkō Site 僧日講の墓 sō Nikkō iseki	Miyazaki			32°02′36″N 131°25′34″E		
Obirano Cave Stone Age Dwelling Site 石器時代住居跡尾平野洞窟 sekki-jidai jūkyo-ato Obirano dōkutsu	Miyakonojō			31°38′08″N 131°07′54″E		
Higashifumoto Rock Buddhas 東麓石窟仏; Higashifumoto sekkutsubutsu	Kobayashi			31°57′24″N 131°06′27″E		
Wakayama Bokusui Residence 若山牧水生家; Wakayama Bokusui seika	Hyūga			32°21′47″N 131°27′44″E		
Ishii Jūji Residence 石井十次生家; Ishii Jūji seika	Takanabe			32°08′31″N 131°30′04″E		
Shimoyumita Site 下弓田遺跡; Shimoyumita iseki	Kushima			31°26′29″N 131°13′11″E		
Jinnai Site 陣内遺跡; Jinnai iseki	Takachiho			32°43′05″N 131°18′34″E		
Honda Site 本田遺跡; Honda iseki	Kobayashi			32°03′11″N 130°59′34″E		
Kizakibaru Battlefield Site 木崎原古戦場跡; Kizakibaru kosenjō ato	Ebino			32°02′22″N 130°49′50″E		
Kannonze Waterway 観音瀬水路; Kannonze suiro	Miyakonojō			31°53′19″N 131°07′42″E		
Akae-chō Kofun 赤江町古墳; Akae-chō kofun	Miyazaki			31°53′38″N 131°25′33″E		
Toi-son Kofun 都井村古墳; Toi-son kofun	Kushima			31°23′52″N 131°19′56″E		
Fukushima-chō Kofun 福島町古墳; Fukushima-chō kofun	Kushima			31°28′10″N 131°14′05″E		
Nojiri-son Kofun 野尻村古墳; Nojiri-son kofun	Kobayashi			31°57′35″N 131°05′22″E		
Masaki-son Kofun 真幸村古墳; Masaki-son kofun	Ebino			32°02′58″N 130°47′09″E		
Aya-chō Kofun 綾町古墳; Aya-chō kofun	Aya			32°00′05″N 131°14′46″E		
Kuraoka-son Kofun 倉岡村古墳; Kuraoka-son kofun	Miyazaki			31°57′21″N 131°21′46″E		
Tonokōri-son Kofun 都於郡村古墳; Tonokōri-son kofun	Saito			32°03′21″N 131°22′23″E		
Tomitaka-chō Kofun 富高町古墳; Tomitaka-chō kofun	Hyūga			32°25′35″N 131°37′19″E		
Takachiho-chō Kofun 高千穂町古墳; Takachiho-chō kofun	Takachiho			32°43′18″N 131°18′32″E		
Ichiki-son Kofun 市木村古墳; Ichiki-son kofun	Kushima			31°27′46″N 131°20′43″E		
Miyakonojō-shi Kofun 都城市古墳; Miyakonojō-shi kofun	Miyakonojō			31°43′32″N 131°03′02″E		
Shiwachi-mura Kofun 志和池村古墳; Shiwachi-mura kofun	Miyakonojō			31°48′55″N 131°06′12″E		
Suki-son Kofun 須木村古墳; Suki-son kofun	Kobayashi			32°04′39″N 131°04′23″E		
Kiyomizu Kofun Cluster 清水古墳群; Kiyomizu kofun-gun	Saito			32°05′53″N 131°23′24″E		
Matsumoto Kofun Cluster 松本古墳群; Matsumoto kofun-gun	Saito			32°06′10″N 131°22′27″E		
Tsuma-chō Kiyomizu-Nishiharu Kofun 妻町清水・西原古墳; Tsuma-chō Kiyomizu-Nishiharu kofun	Saito			32°05′53″N 131°23′24″E		
Hososhima-chō Kofun 細島町古墳; Hososhima-chō kofun	Hyūga			32°25′29″N 131°39′58″E		
Yatsushiro-son Kofun 八代村古墳; Yatsushiro-son kofun	Kunitomi			32°01′29″N 131°21′02″E		
Nishimera-son Kofun 西米良村古墳; Nishimera-son kofun	Nishimera			32°13′56″N 131°12′58″E		
Sadowara-chō Kofun 佐土原町古墳; Sadowara-chō kofun	Miyazaki			32°03′45″N 131°24′18″E		
Aoshima-mura Kofun 青島村古墳; Aoshima-mura kofun	Miyazaki			31°48′11″N 131°27′45″E		
Takajō-chō Kofun 高城町古墳; Takajō-chō kofun	Miyakonojō			31°48′11″N 131°08′45″E		
Iino-son Kofun 飯野村古墳; Iino-son kofun	Ebino			32°01′59″N 130°52′08″E		
Hyakutsukabaru Kofun 百塚原古墳群; Hyakutsukabaru kofun-gun	Saito			32°06′56″N 131°22′01″E		
Nagano Kofun Cluster 永野古墳群; Nagano kofun-gun	Saito			32°06′36″N 131°21′41″E		
Sakaida Kofun 境田古墳; Sakaida kofun	Saito			32°06′00″N 131°21′38″E		
Heguri Kofun Cluster 平郡古墳群; Heguri kofun-gun	Saito			32°05′22″N 131°22′05″E		
Minō-son Kofun 三納村古墳; Minō-son kofun	Saito			32°06′35″N 131°21′40″E		
Tōgō-son Kofun 東郷村古墳; Tōgō-son kofun	Hyūga			32°23′45″N 131°32′06″E		
Saigō-son Kofun 西郷村古墳; Saigō-son kofun	Misato			32°29′36″N 131°21′30″E		
Iwato-son Kofun 岩戸村古墳; Iwato-son kofun	Takachiho			32°44′30″N 131°21′49″E		
Nanaore-son Kofun 七折村古墳; Nanaore-son kofun	Hinokage			32°41′23″N 131°24′23″E		
Tabaru-son Kofun 田原村古墳; Tabaru-son kofun	Takachiho			32°46′17″N 131°15′21″E		
Okimizu Kofun 都城市沖水古墳; Miyakonojō-shi Okimizu kofun	Miyakonojō			31°44′12″N 131°05′47″E		
Nangō-son Kofun 南郷村古墳; Nangō-son kofun	Misato			32°23′12″N 131°19′51″E		
Yamanokuchi-son Kofun 山之口村古墳; Yamanokuchi-son kofun	Miyakonojō			31°46′04″N 131°08′49″E		
Kiwaki-son Kofun 木脇村古墳; Kiwaki-son kofun	Kunitomi			31°58′45″N 131°21′44″E		
Kurusu Cave Tomb Cluster 九流水横穴墓群; Kurusu yokoana bo-gun	Saito			32°06′38″N 131°20′04″E		
Shimo-Sanzai Kofun Cluster 下三財古墳群; Shimo-Sanzai kofun-gun	Saito			32°04′19″N 131°21′21″E		
Jōshinbaru Kofun Cluster 常心原古墳群; Jōshinbaru kofun-gun	Saito			32°04′06″N 131°19′37″E		
Kami-Takano Cave Tomb Cluster 上高野横穴墓群; Kami-Takano yokoana bo-gun	Saito			32°04′57″N 131°19′06″E		
Sanzai Kofun 三財村古墳; Sanzai kofun	Saito					
Tsuno-chō Kofun 都農町古墳; Tsuno-chō kofun	Tsuno			32°14′56″N 131°34′18″E		
Kadokawa-chō Kofun 門川町古墳; Kadokawa-chō kofun	Kadogawa					
Sangasho-son Kofun 三ヶ所村古墳; Sangasho-son kofun	Gokase			32°43′43″N 131°13′27″E		
Nangō-son Kofun 南郷村古墳; Nangō-son kofun	Nichinan			31°29′33″N 131°20′48″E		
Ōyodo Kofun 宮崎市大淀古墳; Miyazaki-shi Ōyodo kofun	Miyazaki			31°55′19″N 131°23′41″E		
Naka-son Kofun 那珂村古墳; Naka-son kofun	Miyazaki			32°01′45″N 131°25′37″E		
Kibana-son Kofun 木花村古墳; Kibana-son kofun	Miyazaki			31°50′34″N 131°25′08″E		
Tōgō-son Kofun 東郷村古墳; Tōgō-son kofun	Nichinan			31°37′00″N 131°26′10″E		
Hosoda-son Kofun 細田村古墳; Hosoda-son kofun	Nichinan			31°36′49″N 131°24′45″E		
Honjō-son Kofun 本城村古墳; Honjō-mura kofun	Kushima					
Takanabe-chō Kofun 高鍋町古墳; Takanabe-chō kofun	Takanabe			32°07′13″N 131°31′55″E		
Kitakata-son Kofun 北方村古墳; Kitakata-son kofun	Nobeoka			32°07′13″N 131°31′55″E		
Mimitsu-chō Kofun 美々津町古墳; Mimitsu-chō kofun	Hyūga					
Nobeoka-shi Kofun 延岡市古墳; Nobeoka-shi kofun	Nobeoka			32°36′20″N 131°40′27″E		
Kawaminami-son Kofun 川南村古墳; Kawaminami-son kofun	Kawaminami			32°12′20″N 131°29′25″E		
Hirose-son Kofun 広瀬村古墳; Hirose-son kofun	Miyazaki			32°00′31″N 131°27′55″E		
Sumiyoshi-son Kofun 住吉村古墳; Sumiyoshi-son kofun	Miyazaki			31°59′24″N 131°26′54″E		
Honjō-chō Kofun 本庄町古墳; Honjō-chō kofun	Kunitomi			31°59′14″N 131°19′36″E		
Kobayashi-chō Kofun 小林町古墳; Kobayashi-chō kofun	Kobayashi			31°58′50″N 131°00′20″E		
Kijō-son Kofun 木城村古墳; Kijō-son kofun	Kijō			32°10′16″N 131°27′04″E		
Shimo-Kitakata Kofun 宮崎市下北方古墳; Shimo-Kitakata kofun	Miyazaki			31°56′55″N 131°24′47″E		
Takaoka-chō Kofun 高岡町古墳; Takaoka-chō kofun	Miyazaki			31°56′57″N 131°19′52″E		
Minamiura-son Kofun 南浦村古墳; Minamiura-son kofun	Nobeoka			32°40′15″N 131°47′10″E		
Kamino-son Kofun 上野村古墳; Kamino-son kofun	Takachiho			32°45′04″N 131°16′41″E		
Takazaki-chō Kofun 高崎町古墳; Takazaki-chō kofun	Miyakonojō			31°52′26″N 131°05′59″E		
Ikime-son Kofun 生目村古墳; Ikime-son kofun	Miyazaki			31°54′54″N 131°21′36″E		
Tonda-son Kofun 富田村古墳; Tonda-son kofun	Shintomi			32°04′04″N 131°29′32″E		
Kamihokita-son Kofun 上穂北村古墳; Kamihokita-son kofun	Saito			32°08′27″N 131°22′20″E		
Takaharu-chō Kofun 高原町古墳; Takaharu-chō kofun	Takaharu			31°54′27″N 130°57′36″E		
Uryūno-son Kofun 瓜生野村古墳; Uryūno-son kofun	Miyazaki			31°57′33″N 131°24′21″E		
Ikeuchi Cave Tombs 池内横穴; Ikeuchi yokoana	Miyazaki			31°57′28″N 131°24′42″E		
Funazuka Kofun 船塚古墳; Funazuka kofun	Miyazaki			31°56′20″N 131°25′24″E		
Reikyōzuka Kofun 鈴鏡塚古墳; Reikyōzuka kofun	Hyūga			32°25′42″N 131°37′17″E		
Kitsunezuka Kofun 狐塚古墳; Kitsunezuka kofun	Nichinan			31°36′36″N 131°25′15″E		
Higashihirashita No.2 Tomb 東平下２号方形周溝墓; Higashihirashita nigō hōkei shūkōbo	Kawaminami			32°13′55″N 131°31′34″E		
Kiyotake Kamiinoharu Site 清武上猪ノ原遺跡; Kiyotake Kamiinoharu iseki	Miyazaki			31°51′58″N 131°22′25″E		
Higashi-Niwara Cave Tomb Cluster 東二原地下式横穴墓群; Higashi-Niwara chika-shiki yokoana bogun	Kobayashi			32°00′43″N 130°59′59″E		

== Municipal Historic Sites ==
As of 1 May 2018, a further one hundred and nine Sites have been designated as being of municipal importance.

== See also ==
- Cultural Properties of Japan
- History of Miyazaki Prefecture
- Hyūga Province
- List of Places of Scenic Beauty of Japan (Miyazaki)
- Miyazaki Prefectural Museum of Nature and History
