= Ikime Kofun Cluster =

Ikime Kofun cluster
- 生目古墳群 (Japanese)
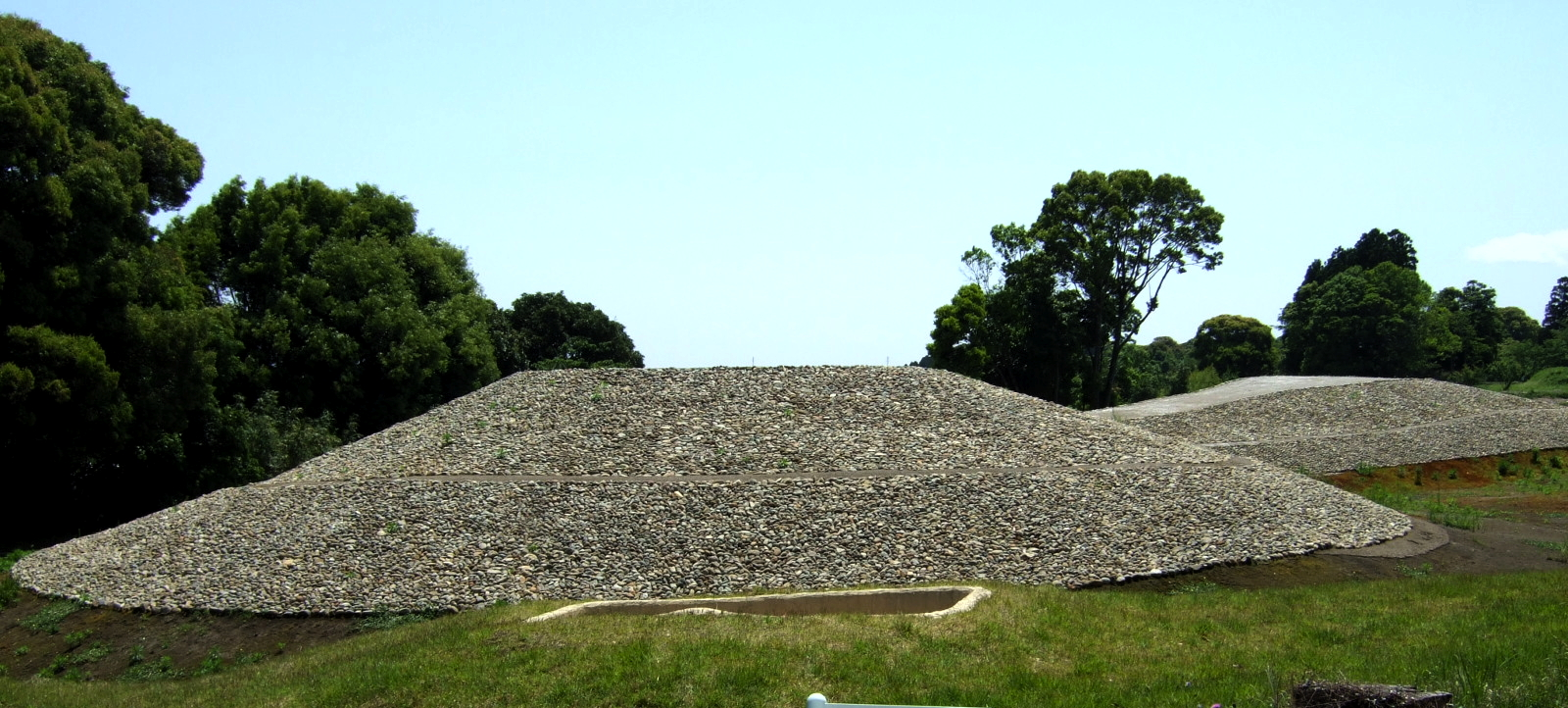
- Ikime Kofun No.5

- Ikime Kofun cluster Ikime Kofun Cluster (Japan)
- Interactive map of Ikime Kofun cluster
- 32°08′32″N 131°31′47″E
- Type: kofun
- Periods: Kofun period
- Location: Miyazaki, Miyazaki, Japan
- Region: Kyushu

History
- Built: c. 3rd to 5th century AD

Site notes
- Public access: No facilities

The Ikime Kofun cluster (生目古墳群) is a group of Kofun period burial mounds located in the Atoe-cho neighborhood of the city of Miyazaki, Miyazaki Prefecture in Kyushu Japan. The tumulus group was designated a National Historic Site of Japan in 1943 with the area under protection expanded in 2007.

== Overview ==
The Ikime Kofun Cluster is located along the west side of the Ōyodo River, and extends over an area about 1.3 kilometers from east-to-west, about 1.2 kilometers from north-to-south, with an elevation of about 20 meters above sea level. A group of tombs dating from the early to late middle Kofun period, when designated a National Historic site in 1943, it consisted of 43 tumuli, seven of which were zenpō-kōen-fun (前方後円墳), which are shaped like a keyhole, having one square end and one circular end, when viewed from above, and 36 empun (円墳)-style round tombs. Three of the zenpō-kōen-fun were over 100 meters in length. The largest of these is Kofun No.3, with a length of 143 meters making it the third largest in Kyushu. Kofun No.1 a total length of 136 meters and a height of 17 meters, and has proportions similar to Hashihaka Kofun in Nara Prefecture. Many of the tumuli have fukiishi and some had cylindrical haniwa.

Subsequent archaeological excavations have led to the discovery of new burial mounds and underground tunnel tombs. Currently, 51 tumuli have been confirmed, as well as 36 underground tunnel graves, 49 earthen pit graves, and 3 circular groove graves. On the other hand, it was also discovered that one of the 43 originally designated burial mounds was not a kofun, but was a natural hill. An unusual feature of some tumuli, notably Kofun No.7 and Kofun No. 19 was the use of a "vertical corridor burial chamber". This is a design unique to the Kyushu region in that the burial chamber was accessed by a vertical pit to a side opening, with the pit filled-in after burial.

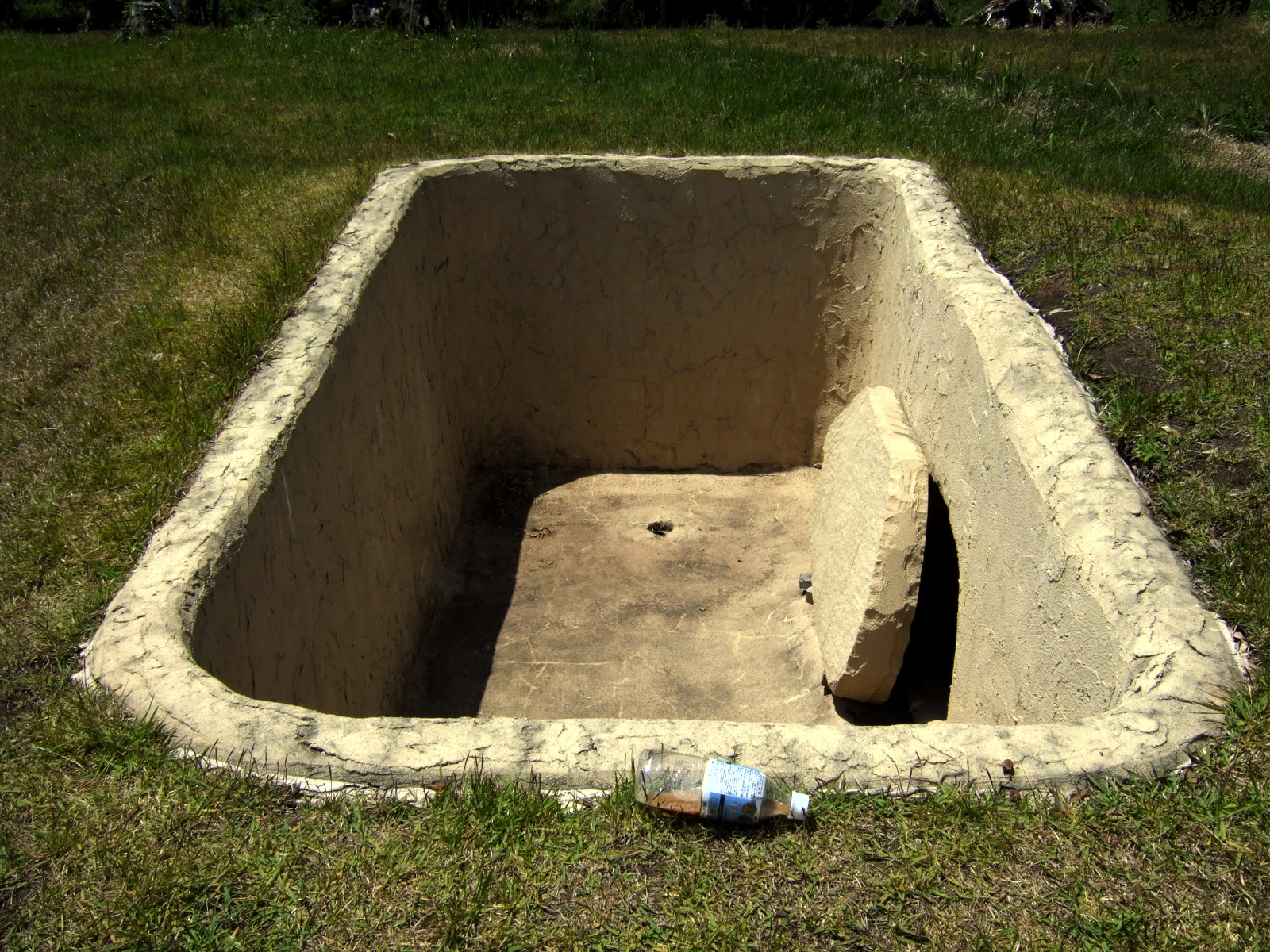
Kofun No.19 burial chamber illustrating vertical corridor

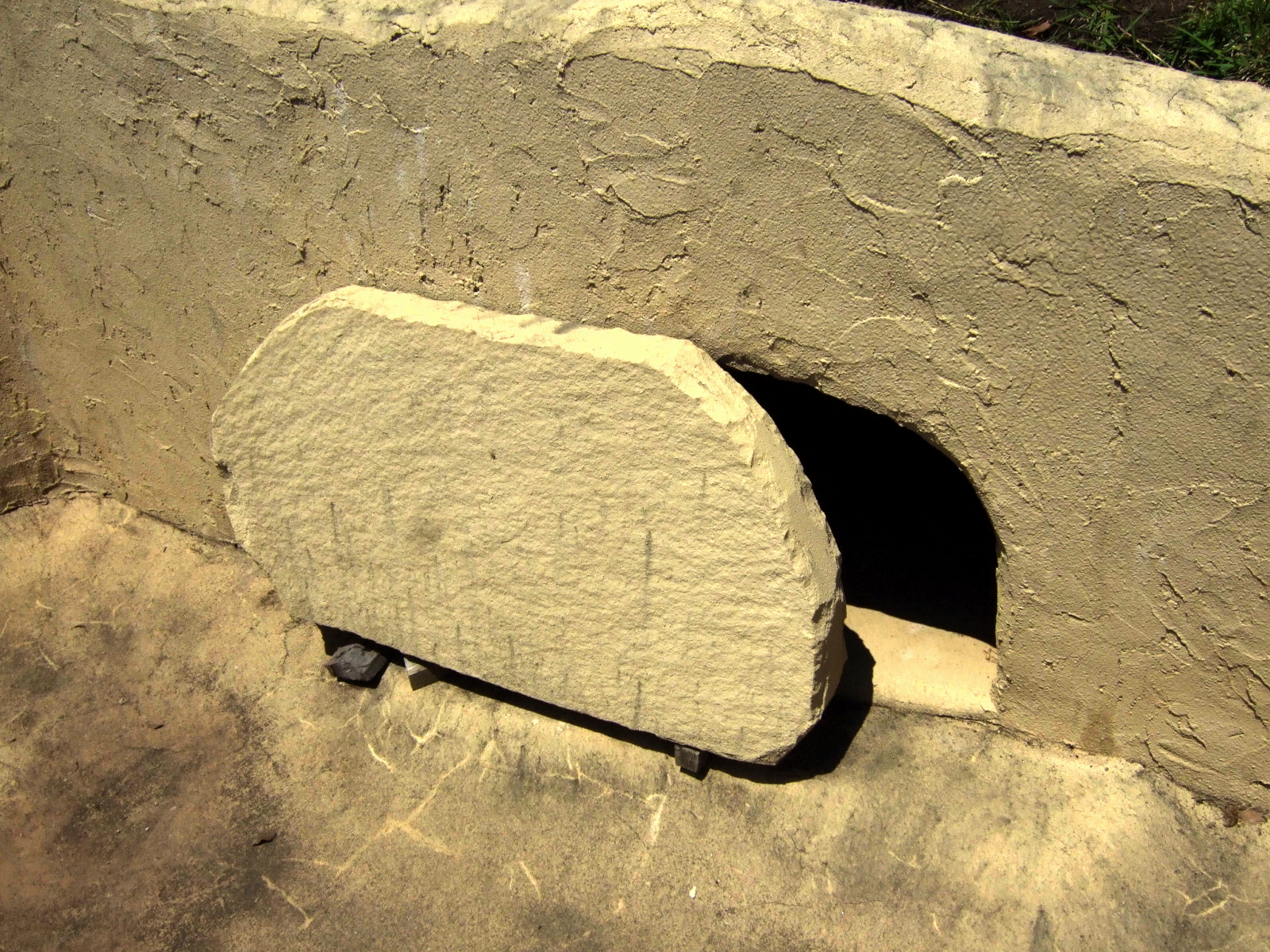
side door

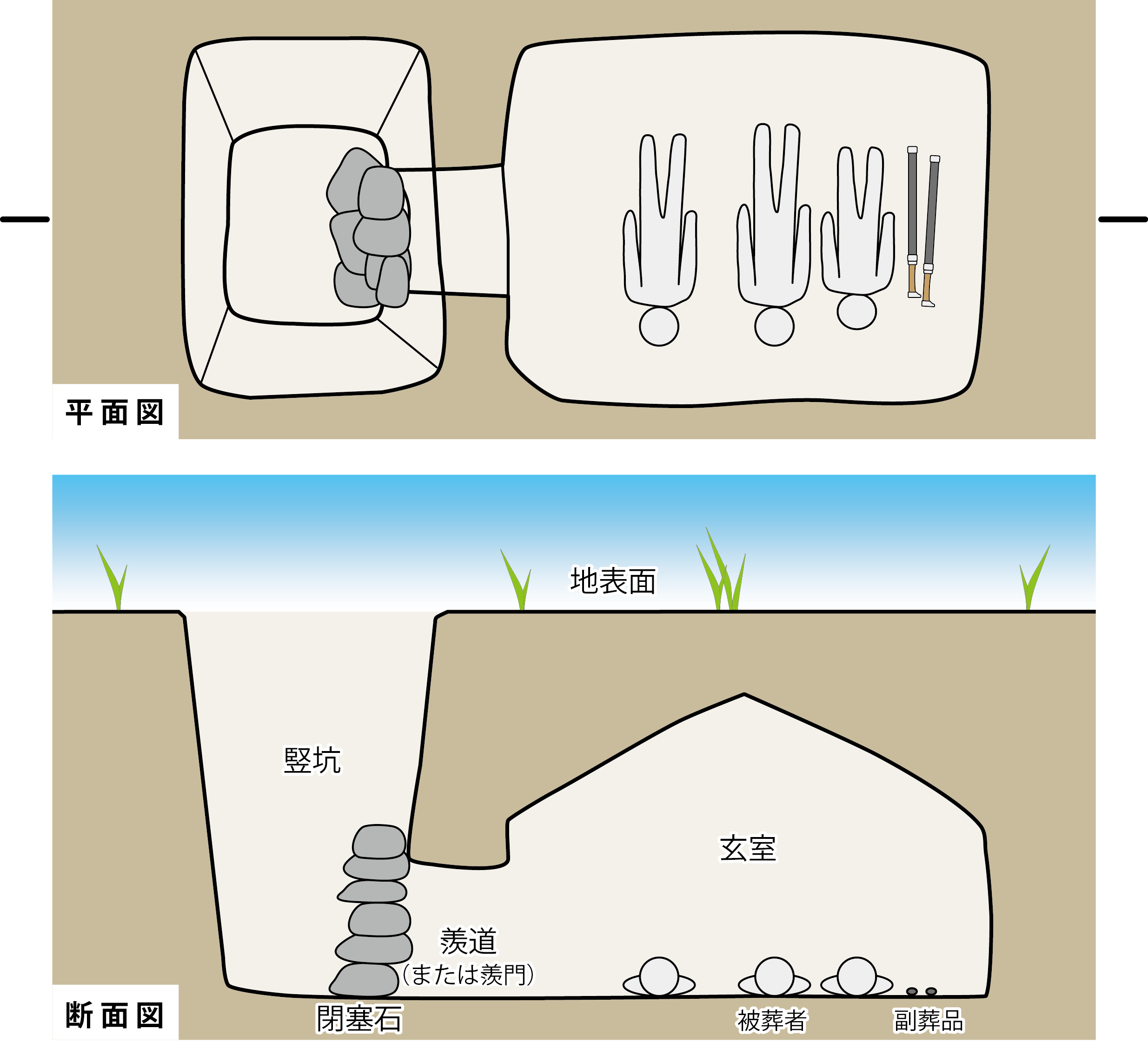
Illustration of "vertical corridor burial chamber"

Currently, the site is maintained as the Ikume Kofun Group Historical Site Park. It is located approximately 20 minutes by car from Miyazaki Station on the JR Kyushu Nippō Main Line.

== See also ==
- List of Historic Sites of Japan (Miyazaki)
