= Ōyodo =

Ōyodo may refer to:

- Ōyodo, Nara - town in Japan
- Ōyodo River - a river in Kagoshima and Miyazaki prefectures, Japan
- Japanese cruiser Ōyodo - World War II cruiser
- JDS Ōyodo, an Abukuma-class destroyer escort of the Japanese Maritime Self-Defense Force
