= Chibatake Kofun =

Burial site in Japan

- 千畑古墳 (Japanese)
- Chibatake Kofun Chibatake Kofun (Japan)
- 32°08′24.1″N 131°24′07.4″E
- Type: Kofun
- Periods: Kofun period
- Location: Saito, Miyazaki, Japan
- Region: Kyushu region

History
- Built: c.4th century

Site notes
- Public access: Yes (no facilities)
- National Historic Site of Japan

Chibatake Kofun (千畑古墳) is a Kofun period keyhole-shaped burial mound, located in Sakurada, Hokita neighborhood of the city of Saito, Miyazaki in the Kyushu region of Japan. The tumulus was designated a National Historic Site of Japan in 1934.

== Overview ==
The Chibatake Kofun is located on the left bank of the Hitotsuse River, on the southern slope of the Chausubaruhara plateau. On the opposite shore of the river is the Nishitobaru plateau with the Saitobaru Kofun Cluster. The Chibatake Kofun is part of the Chausuhara Kofun Cluster, which consists of three keyhole-shaped tombs and 52 round burial mounds. There are also more than 50 corridor-type kofun (横穴式石室, yokoana-shiki sekishitsu) tombs in the area. As the tumulus has never been excavated, many details about the construction of the mound is uncertain, and dense groves of bamboo forest hamper accurate topographical measurements, but it is thought that the natural topography has been shaped into a zenpō-kōen-fun (前方後円墳), which is shaped like a keyhole, having one square end and one circular end, when viewed from above.

The main burial chamber is a horizontal stone chamber, which is opened on the south side. The chamber is made of cut stones stacked horizontally and uses huge monolith for the ceiling. This is the largest in the prefecture, with a total length of 9.2 meters. The burial chamber itself has a width of 2.7 meters, a height of 2.8 meters, and length of 1.7 meters. This type of construction is very unusual for the region, and is found elsewhere only at the Jōshinzuka Kofun and the Oni no Kutsu Kofun in the Saitobaru Kofun Cluster. No grave goods have been recovered, as per an early Meiji period report, local people robbed the tomb during the Bunka to Bunsei era (1804 to 1829) of the Edo period.

== See also ==
- List of Historic Sites of Japan (Miyazaki)
