= Ōshima Hatakeda Site =

- 大島畠田遺跡 (Japanese)
- Ōshima Hatakeda Site Ōshima Hatakeda Site (Japan)
- Interactive map of Ōshima Hatakeda Site
- 31°46′18″N 131°04′31″E
- Periods: Heian period
- Location: Miyakonojō, Miyazaki, Japan
- Region: Kyushu

Site notes
- Public access: Yes

The Ōshima Hatakeda Site (大島畠田遺跡, Ōshima Hatakeda iseki) is an archaeological site with the traces of a Heian period settlement, located in what is now the Kaneda neighborhood of the city of Miyakonojō, Miyazaki Prefecture in Kyushu, Japan. It was designated a National Historic Site of Japan in 2002, with the area under protection expanded in 2004.

== Overview ==
The Ōshima Hatakeda Site was discovered in 1994 during a field development project on a slightly elevated area of alluvial land near the confluence of the Ōyodo and Shonai rivers, approximately in the center of the Miyakonojō basin. The elevation is around 133 meters, and the difference in height from the floodplain of the Ōyodo River to the west is about 1.5 meters.

The confirmed area of the site is roughly 65 meters from north to south and 60 meters east to west. At the northern end of a slightly elevated area with a slope descending from north to south, there was a very large building with dug pillar foundations at a higher point than the surrounding area, and to the south of that was the remains of a pond-like structure, and the southern end of the site was divided by a gate, a row of fences, and a dividing ditch. To the east of the site is a natural depression measuring 45 meters north–south, 30 meters east–west, and 1.4 meters deep. The remains exist parallel to this depression, and since there are no remains that cross the depression, it is clear that this depression formed a boundary on the east side. The western edge of the site has been leveled and is unclear, but it appears that it did not extend very far to the west. The northern end of the site has not been clearly defined in archaeological excavations.

The remains include 35 dug-out pillar buildings (including the large building at the north end) and a one-room building on the island in the middle of the pond, as well as 25 earthen pits, possibly prehistoric storage pits. There are places where the old and new building foundations overlap, and the site can thus be divided into four or five periods depending on the overlap and the inclination of the central axis of the building, with the earliest dating from the late 9th century to the early 10th century, and the latest to around the 12th century.

The large building was a five by two bay structure, with eaves on all sides around the outside of the building. Further outside the eaves are rows of small-diameter postholes, which are the remains of sun-eaves .The actual length is 11.9 x 5.6 meters for the main building, and 20.3 x 14.3 meters including the eaves, with an area of 290 square meters. The postholes in the main building are over one meter in diameter.

Although the pond-like remains to the south of the large building was dug artificially, there is no proof that it was actually a pond, and scientific research indicates that there may have been no water except during rainy days. It was an irregular rectangle measuring 19 meters from east-to-west and 21 meters from north-to-south, with the ground left untouched in the center, making it look like an island. This island appears to have been paved with river rocks. After the pond became filled in by sediment, a U-shaped trench was re-dug to surround the original island. It is presumed that the center island contained a religious facility such as a temple or shrine.

In addition to Haji ware and Sue ware, many pieces of green-glazed pottery from Kyoto, gray-glazed pottery from the Tōkai region, Chinese celadon porcelain, and white porcelain have been unearthed from the ruins, as well as pottery with ink calligraphy inscriptions. Judging from the age of these artifacts, the core age of the ruins is thought to be from the late 9th century to the early 10th century.

Judging from the presence of the largest building in southern Kyushu, this ruin appears to have been the residence of an influential person in the region. The gate that stood at the southern end of the site was a four-legged gate with two supporting pillars in front and behind the main pillar; in Heian-kyō, only ministers and above were permitted build gates of this type. The excavated items include a large number of glazed pottery and trade ceramics. This was something that was not available to ordinary people at the time. The large number of Haji pottery were of a type mainly used at drinking parties and discarded after the banquet was over, suggesting that a banquets were frequently held hosting a large number of people. The site's location at the confluence of major rivers, about 300 meters from the current river channel, suggests that it was connected to river transportation. During this period, the Ritsuryō system was transforming Japan, and powerful local clans were becoming wealthy "petty aristocracy" in countryside. This ruin is important as it concretely shows the situation in Hyūga Province during this period.

== See also ==
- List of Historic Sites of Japan (Miyazaki)
