= Minamikata Kofun Cluster =

Minamikata Kofun cluster
- 南方古墳群 (Japanese)
- Minamikata Kofun cluster Minamikata Kofun Cluster (Japan)
- Interactive map of Minamikata Kofun cluster
- 32°34′22″N 131°37′49″E
- Type: kofun
- Periods: Kofun period
- Location: Nobeoka, Miyazaki, Japan
- Region: Kyushu

History
- Built: c. 5th to 6th century AD

Site notes
- Public access: No facilities

The Minamikata Kofun cluster (南方古墳群) is a group of Kofun period burial mounds located in the Amori-cho, Yoshino-cho, Onuki-cho, Maino-cho, Noji-cho neighborhoods of the city of Nobeoka, Miyazaki Prefecture in Kyushu Japan. The tumulus group was collectively designated a National Historic Site of Japan in 1943.

== Overview ==
The Minamikata Kofun Cluster consist of tumuli distributed in the low hills that open to the west of Nobeoka city in the lower reaches of the Gokase River. It has been classified into the Tenka, Onuki, Maino, Yoshino, Noji, and Noda subgroups depending on location. The tumuli date to the early 5th to 6th century, with a variety of burial facilities such as clay coffins, boat-shaped sarcophagi, and side-pit-style stone burial chambers. At the time of the National Historic Site designation, there were 42 kofun, including five zenpō-kōen-fun (前方後円墳), which are shaped like a keyhole, having one square end and one circular end, when viewed from above, but despite the protected status there are 38 kofun remaining in total. These consist of the aforementioned five zenpō-kōen-fun, enpun (円墳)-style round tumuli, and one horizontal corridor-type cave-tomb. Minamikata Kofun No. 10 in the Tenkashi group is an "ekagami-style" variation of the zenpō-kōen-fun with a total length of 78 meters and a diameter of approximately 52 meters at the posterior circular portion. The burial chamber contained a clay coffin covering a wooden coffin, and items such as magatama beads, cylindrical beads, bamboo combs, and iron arrowheads and iron swords were found as grave goods. On the hill facing south is the Minamikata Kofun No. 1, also an "ekagami-style" tomb with a total length of 71 meters and a diameter of 35 meter at the posterior circular portion, but it has not been excavated because it is site of a Shinto shrine (Tenka Jinja) whose Honden is located above the burial chamber.

The history of research into this group of burial mounds is long, and it is said that it began in the late Edo period with the investigation of the Minamikata Kofun No. 24 by Naito Masayasu, the daimyō of Nobeoka Domain. In the early 20th century, surface collections were carried out around Minamikata Kofun No. 11, No. 12, and No. 13 and numerous stone tools, beads, gold rings, and Sue ware pottery was found.

The site is approximately ten minutes by car from Nobeoka Station on the JR Kyushu Nippō Main Line.

== See also ==
- List of Historic Sites of Japan (Miyazaki)
