= Nakanooku Stele =

Sengoku period stone monument

Nakanooku kuyōhi
- 中ノ尾供養碑 (Japanese)
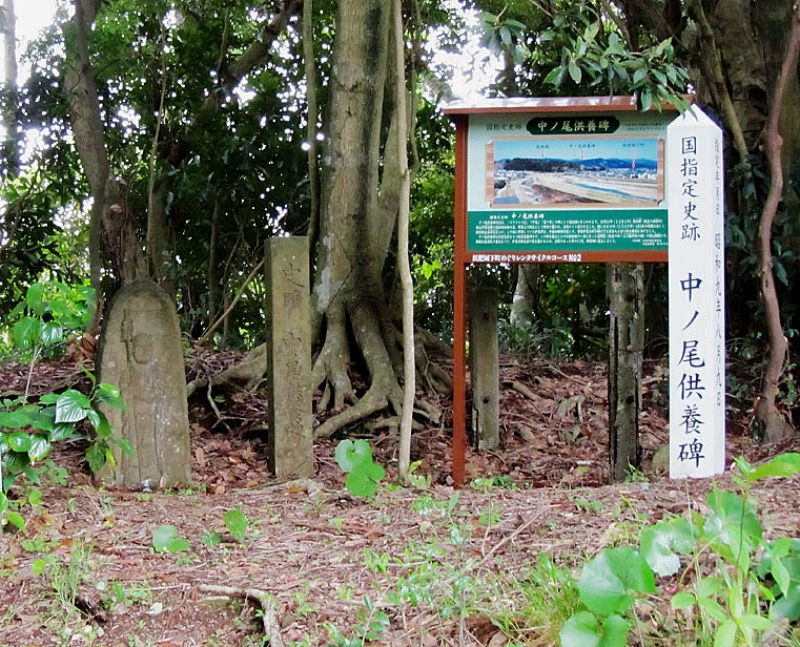
- Nakanooku kuyōhi

- Nakanooku kuyōhi Nakanooku Stele (Japan)
- Interactive map of Nakanooku kuyōhi
- 31°38′23″N 131°22′02″E
- Type: stone monument
- Periods: Sengoku period
- Location: Nichinan, Miyazaki, Japan
- Region: Kyushu

Site notes
- Public access: Yes (no facilities)

The Nakanooku Stele (中ノ尾供養碑, Nakanooku kuyōhi) is a stone monument erected in the Sengoku period to honor the dead of a battle between the Itō clan and the Shimazu clan, located in the Tonodokoro neighborhood of the city of Nichinan, Miyazaki Prefecture, Japan. It was designated a National Historic Site in 1934.

== Overview ==
During the Sengoku period, Hyūga Province was a contested area between the Shimazu clan, who had been expanding their power from their base in southern Hyūga from the Kamakura period to the Muromachi period, and the Itō clan, who had been expanding their area of control in central Hyūga from the Muromachi period. In April 1547, the Itō attacked the Obi region and built forts at Nakanoo and Ikinoo overlooking Obi Castle. The Shimazu counterattacked at Nakanoo in the early hours of the morning, killing over 300 Itō defenders in one battle.

This stone monument was erected in November 1547 by the Shimazu clan in a corner of Nakanoo Fort as a kuyōtō to placate the souls of the Itō war dead, and is thus slightly different from the more secular cenotaph. It is in the form of a Jizō Bosatsu with a boat-shaped halo. The monument is 1.2 meters high and 50 centimeters wide. The Obi region was later conquered by the Itō in 1568, but lost to the Shimazu again in 1576, and became part of the Itō clan's Obi Domain under the Tokugawa shogunate from 1601 to the Meiji restoration in 1871. The monument is approximately a 30-minute walk from Obi Station on the JR Kyushu Nichinan Line.

== See also ==
- List of Historic Sites of Japan (Miyazaki)
