= Chausubaru Kofun Cluster =

Group of Kofun period burial. mounds

- 茶臼原古墳群 (Japanese)
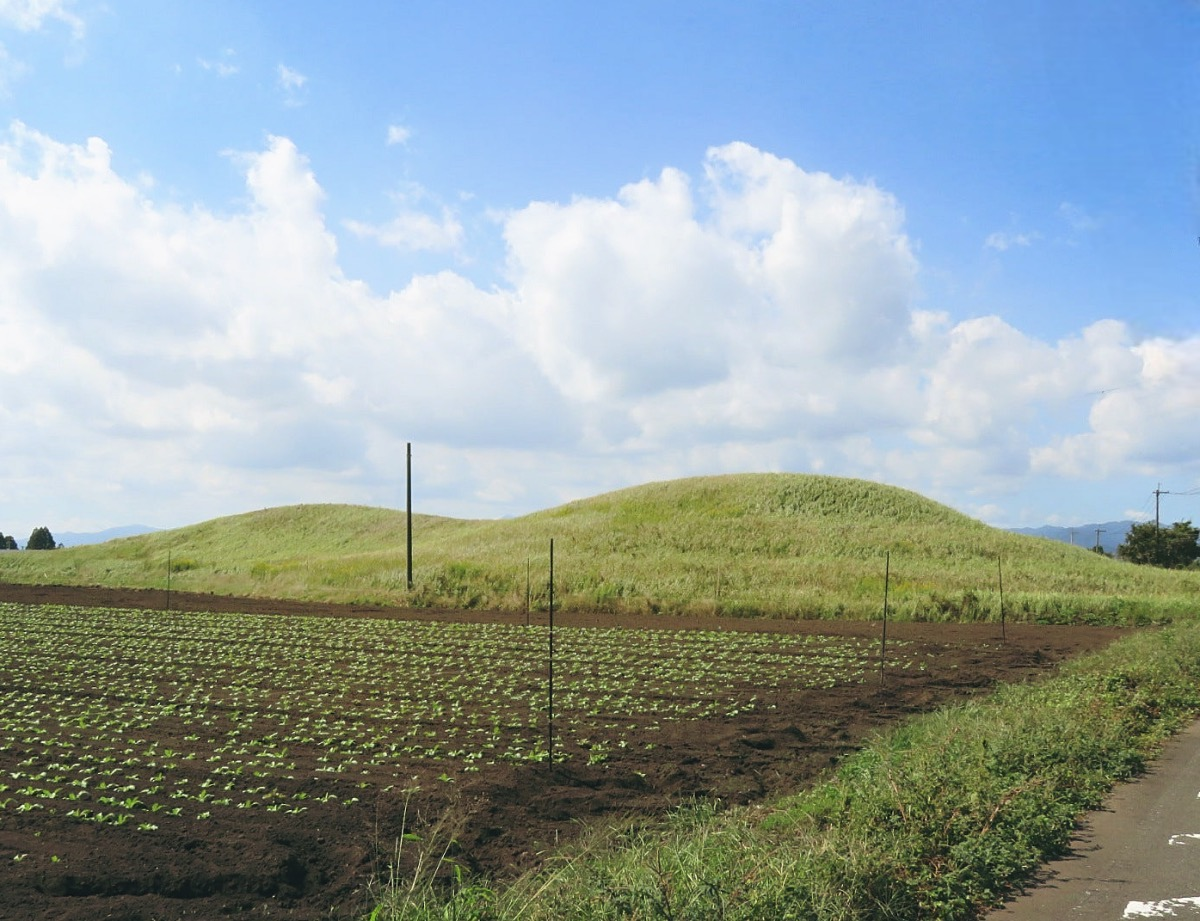
- Koyanezuka Kofun

- Chausubaru Kofun Cluster Chausubaru Kofun Cluster (Japan)
- 32°08′36″N 131°24′51″E
- Type: necropolis
- Periods: Kofun period
- Location: Saito, Miyazaki, Japan
- Region: Kyushu

History
- Built: c. 3rd to 5th century AD

Site notes
- Owner: Public
- Public access: Yes
- National Special Historic Site of Japan

The Chausubaru Kofun Cluster (茶臼原古墳群, Chausubaru kofungun) is a group of Kofun period burial mounds located in the Chausubaru neighborhood of the city of Saito, Miyazaki Prefecture in Kyushu Japan. The tumulus group was designated a National Historic Site of Japan in 1973.

== Background ==
The Chausubaru Kofun Cluster is located on a plateau at an elevation of about 130 meters on the northeast bank of the Hitotsuse River that flows southeast from Hitotsuse Dam through Saito City and into the Hyūga Sea. The cluster consists of a total of 55 confirmed burial mounds, including three zenpō-kōen-fun (前方後円墳), which are shaped like a keyhole, having one square end and one circular end, when viewed from above, and 52 empun (円墳)-style round tombs.

Of the 55 kofun, the one with the most archaeological excavation research is the Koyanezuka Kofun (児屋根塚古墳), which is 110 meters long with a 64-meter diameter circular portion and 61 meter wide rectangular portion and height of seven meters. It is orientated to the south and was surrounded by a shield-shaped moat. It is estimated to date from the early to mid-5th century. Grave goods included a bronze mirror encased with clay and engraved with four mythical beasts and increased with 24 kanji, a serpentine sword, iron straight sword and a large number of round, tubular and magatama beads. Per legend, the tumulus was the tomb of the kami Ame-no-Koyane, after whom the tumulus was named. Some of the tumuli in the group are estimated to be older than the Koyanezuka Kofun, but most have not been investigated and the details are unknown.

== See also ==
- List of Historic Sites of Japan (Miyazaki)
