= Ikime Shrine =

Shinto shrine in Miyazaki Prefecture, Japan

Ikime-jinja 生目神社
- Location within Japan

Religion
- Affiliation: Shinto
- Deity: Emperor Ōjin; Taira no Kagekiyo

Location
- Location: 345, Ikime, Miyazaki; Miyazaki 880-2103
- Interactive map of Ikime-jinja 生目神社
- Coordinates: 31°55′06″N 131°22′36″E

Website
- www.miya-shoko.or.jp/ikime/histo/ikime_jinnsya.html

Ikime-jinja (生目神社) is a Shinto shrine located in Miyazaki, Miyazaki prefecture, Japan. It is dedicated to Emperor Ōjin and Taira no Kagekiyo.
