= List of places of scenic beauty of Japan (Miyazaki) =

This list is of the places of scenic beauty of Japan located within the Prefecture of Miyazaki.

== National Places of Scenic Beauty ==
As of 1 June 2019, five Places have been designated at a national level.

Place	Municipality	Comments	Image	Coordinates	Type	Ref.
Takachiho Gorge 五箇瀬川峡谷 (高千穂峡谷); Gokase-gawa-kyōkoku (Takachiho kyōkoku)	Takachiho	also a designated Natural Monument		32°34′48″N 131°30′04″E	6	
Mount Hiei-Mount Hayazu 比叡山および矢筈岳; Hiei-zan oyobi Hayazu-dake	Nobeoka, Hinokage			32°39′08″N 131°26′34″E	6, 10	
Osuzuyama Falls 尾鈴山瀑布群; Osuzuyama bakufu-gun	Tsuno	in Osuzu Prefectural Natural Park		32°17′46″N 131°27′19″E	6	
Myōkoku-ji Gardens 妙国寺庭園; Myōkokuji teien	Hyūga			32°25′32″N 131°39′54″E	1	
Udo 鵜戸; Udo	Nichinan			31°39′01″N 131°28′00″E		

== Prefectural Places of Scenic Beauty ==
As of 1 April 2019, seven Places have been designated at a prefectural level.

Place	Municipality	Comments	Image	Coordinates	Type	Ref.
Suki Falls 須木の滝; Suki no taki	Kobayashi			32°04′14″N 131°05′05″E		
Katsume Family Gardens 勝目氏庭園; Katsume-shi teien	Nichinan			31°37′28″N 131°21′17″E		
Nachi Falls 那智の滝; Nachi-no-taki	Nobeoka			32°37′28″N 131°42′16″E		
Hashiguchi Family Gardens 橋口氏庭園; Hashiguchi-shi teien	Hyūga			32°20′07″N 131°36′38″E		
Otojima 乙島; Otojima	Kadogawa			32°27′59″N 131°40′07″E		
Mount Mukabaki 行縢山; Mukabaki-yama	Nobeoka			32°37′33″N 131°34′21″E		
Kijino Tsugao Lava Valley 鬼神野・栂尾溶岩渓谷; Kijino Tsugao yōgan keikoku	Misato			32°24′36″N 131°15′14″E		

== Municipal Places of Scenic Beauty ==
As of 1 May 2018, four Places have been designated at a municipal level, including:

Place	Municipality	Comments	Image	Coordinates	Type	Ref.
Inohae Falls 猪八重滝群; Inohae-taki-gun	Nichinan			31°43′38″N 131°22′15″E		
Yoshōkan Gardens 豫章館庭園; Yoshōkan-teien	Nichinan			31°37′38″N 131°21′05″E		

== Registered Places of Scenic Beauty ==
As of 1 June 2019, two Monuments have been registered (as opposed to designated) as Places of Scenic Beauty at a national level.

Site	Municipality	Comments	Image	Coordinates	Type	Ref.
Former Itō Denzaemon Gardens 旧伊東伝左衛門庭園 kyū-Itō Denzaemon teien	Nichinan			31°37′38″N 131°21′05″E		
Former Hōonji Gardens 旧報恩寺庭園 kyū-Hōonji teien	Nichinan			31°36′07″N 131°22′44″E		

== See also ==
- Cultural Properties of Japan
- List of Historic Sites of Japan (Miyazaki)
- List of parks and gardens of Miyazaki Prefecture
