= Matsumotozuka Kofun =

- 松本塚古墳 (Japanese)
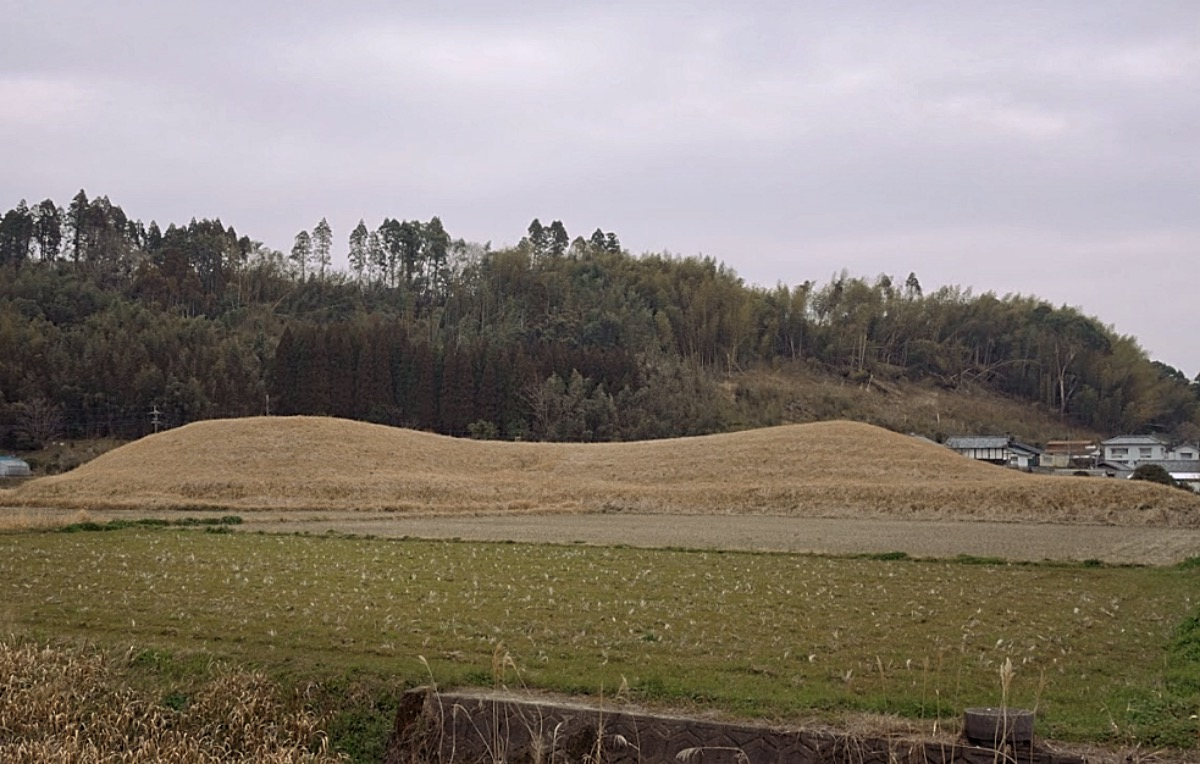
- Matsumotozuka Kofun

- Matsumotozuka Matsumotozuka Kofun (Japan)
- Interactive map of Matsumotozuka Kofun
- 32°06′08.7″N 131°22′29″E
- Type: Kofun
- Periods: Kofun period
- Location: Saito, Miyazaki, Japan
- Region: Kyushu

History
- Built: c.late 5th century

Site notes
- Public access: Yes (no facilities)

Matsumotozuka Kofun (松本塚古墳) is a Kofun period keyhole-shaped burial mound, located in the Sannō neighborhood of the city of Saito, Miyazaki in Kyushu, Japan. The tumulus was designated a National Historic Site of Japan in 1944. It is also called the Funazuka Kofun (船塚古墳) as it appears to be shaped like a ship.

== Overview ==
The Matsumotozuka Kofun is a zenpō-kōen-fun (前方後円墳), which is shaped like a keyhole, having one square end and one circular end, when viewed from above. It is located surrounded paddy fields, on the south side of a plateau called Matsumotobara, which stretches 1.4 kilometers on the norths side of the Sanno River, and west of the city center to the southeast. The tumulus has a total length of about 104 meters, with the diameter of the posterior circular portion at 61 meters, with a height of 7.6 meters, and the width of the anterior rectangular portion being 79 meters, with a height of eight meters. There is also a trapezoidal structure on the west side, presumably a ceremonial platform. The tumulus was surrounded by a shield-shaped moat and embankment, which was discovered during archaeological excavations, conducted in 1986 and 1987. Together with the moat, the total length is 149 meters. The burial mound was built in two stages. The dimensions and design of the tumulus is very close to that of the Karusato Otsuka Kofun (late 5th century) one of the Furuichi Kofun Cluster located in Habikino, Osaka.

Cylindrical and a smaller number of "morning glory-shaped" haniwa have been recovered from the moat. The date of construction is estimated to be around the end of the 5th century based on excavated artifacts. There is no other zenpō-kōen-fun from the same period, including the Saitobaru Kofun Cluster, in the Hitotsuse River basin, and the tumulus is also highly unusual in that it was built on alluvial land rather than on a plateau.

The tumulus was part of a small cluster of enpun (円墳) round mounds of the same period known as the Sanno Kofun Cluster, but almost all of these smaller burial mounds have now been destroyed.

The tumulus is about 17 kilometers northeast of Sadowara Station on the JR Kyushu Nippo Main Line, or five kilometers southeast of the Saito Kofun Cluster

== See also ==
- List of Historic Sites of Japan (Miyazaki)
