= Nyūtabaru Kofun Cluster =

- 新田原古墳群 (Japanese)
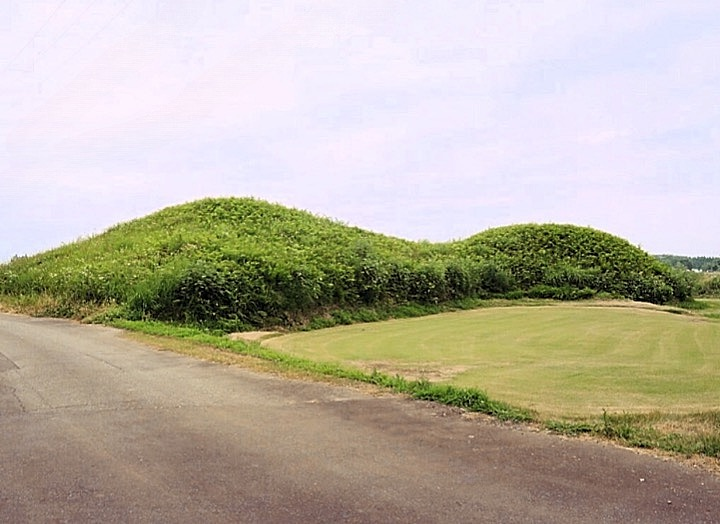
- Nyūtabaru Kofun No.56

- Nyūtabaru Kofun Cluster Nyūtabaru Kofun Cluster (Japan)
- Interactive map of Nyūtabaru Kofun Cluster
- 32°04′47″N 131°25′50″E
- Type: necropolis
- Periods: Kofun period
- Location: Shintomi, Saito, Miyazaki, Japan
- Region: Kyushu

History
- Built: c. 4th to 6th century AD

Site notes
- Owner: Public
- Public access: Yes

The Nyūtabaru Kofun Cluster (新田原古墳群, Nyūtabaru kofungun) is the name for four groups of Kofun period burial mounds located in the Nitta neighborhood of the town of Shintomi and the Umatsu neighborhood of the city of Saito, Miyazaki Prefecture in Kyushu Japan. The tumulus group was designated a National Historic Site of Japan in 1944.

== Background ==
The Nyūtabaru Plateau is at an elevation of about 70 meters on the left bank of the Hitotsuse River that flows southeast from Hitotsuse Dam through Saito City and into the Hyūga Sea. The plateau contains 207 known burial mounds of various sizes and types. These are divided into four groups based on their distribution and construction period, and from the east to west are name the Tsukahara Kofun Cluster, Ishifune Kofun Cluster, Yamanobo Kofun Cluster, and Gionbara Kofun Cluster. The Gionbara group, where the kofun are most concentrated, consists of 139 empun (円墳)-style round tumuli, 14 keyhole-shaped zenpō-kōen-fun (前方後円墳), one square hōfun (方墳)-style tumulus, and one tumulus of unknown shape. One of the zenpō-kōen-fun, the Mukadezuka Kofun (Nyūtabaru No.58) has a length of 80 meters, and had one 1000 haniwa, and of unique designs not found in other burial mounds. It is thought to have been built in the 6th century (late Kofun period).

The area is approximately 15 minutes by car from Hyūga-Shintomi Station on the JR Kyushu Nippō Main Line.

== See also ==
- List of Historic Sites of Japan (Miyazaki)
