= Minami Kyushu University =

Higher education institution in Miyazaki Prefecture, Japan

Coordinates: 31°56′11″N 131°24′55″E

Minami Kyushu Junior College
- 南九州短期大学
- Type: Private; Junior college
- Established: 1965
- Location: Miyazaki, Miyazaki, Japan
- Website: www.mkjc.ac.jp

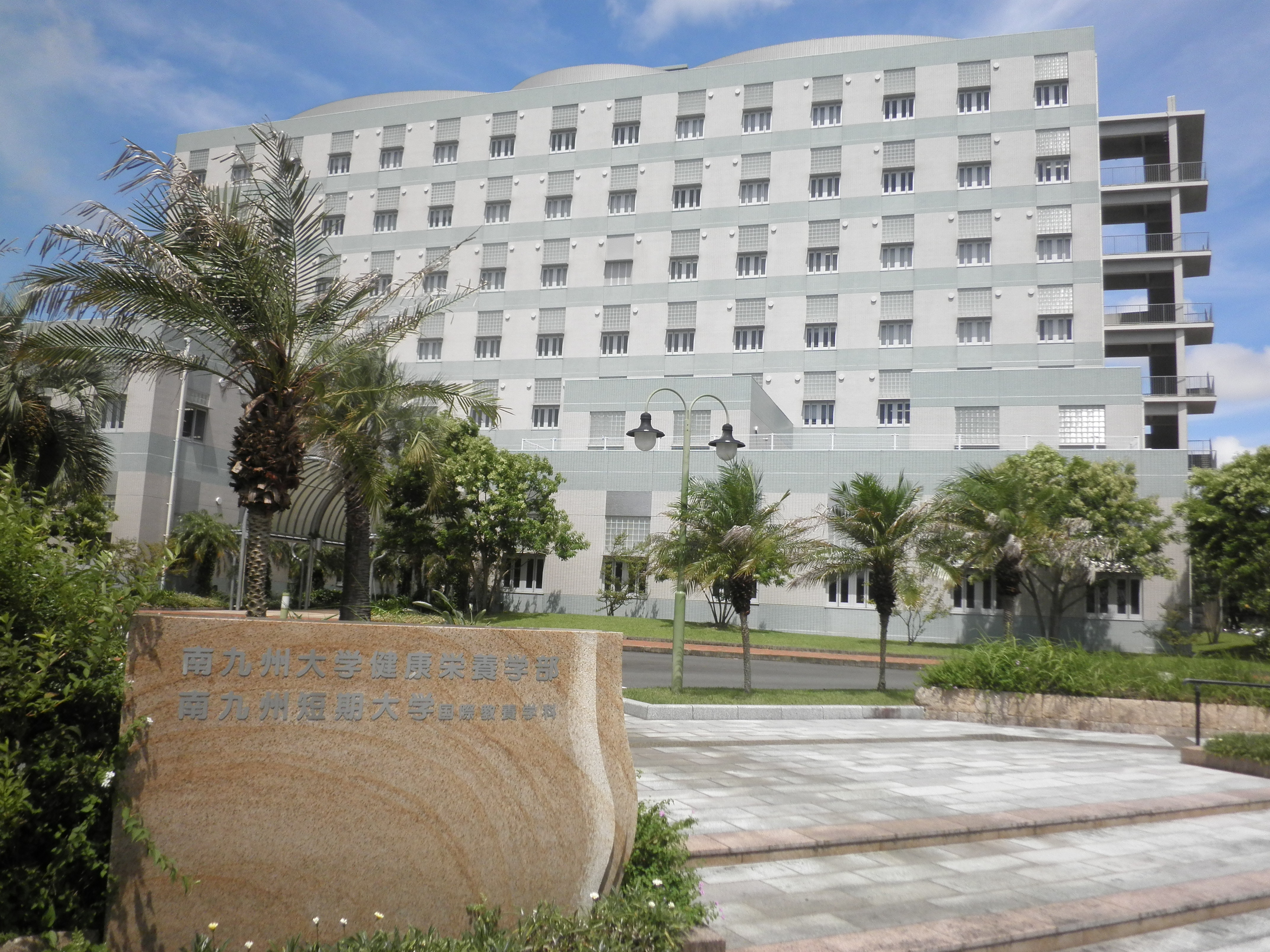
Minami Kyushu University Miyazaki Campus

Minami Kyushu Junior College (南九州短期大学, Minami Kyūshū Tanki Daigakubu) is a private junior college in Miyazaki, Miyazaki, Japan.

The junior college was founded in 1965 as a coeducational college, but later became women-only. From April 1, 1999, it became coeducational again. It offers courses in international studies.

== See also ==
- List of junior colleges in Japan
