= Motonobaru Site =

Archaeological site in Japan

- 本野原遺跡 (Japanese)
- Motonobaru Site Motonobaru Site (Japan)
- Interactive map of Motonobaru Site
- 31°49′23″N 131°16′57″E
- Type: settlement
- Periods: Jōmon period
- Location: Miyazaki, Miyazaki, Japan
- Region: Kyushu

Site notes
- Discovered: 2000
- Public access: None

The Motonobaru Site (本野原遺跡, Motonobaru iseki) is an archaeological site consisting of a complex settlement trace primarily from the Jōmon period, located in the Tano neighborhood of the city of Miyazaki, Miyazaki Prefecture on the of Kyushu Japan. The site was designated a National Historic Site of Japan in 2004. More than 100 pit dwellings have been excavated, and along with the Yokomine Site on Tanegashima, it is the largest ring settlement to have been found in western Japan.

== Overview ==
Motonobaru Site is located on a plateau at an elevation of approximately 180 meters on an alluvial fan at the foot of Mt. Wanitsukayama. In 2000, the Tano Town Board of Education conducted an archaeological excavation in conjunction with a prefectural farmland conservation and improvement project, and found that it was a complex of ruins of a large-scale village that began in the Japanese Paleolithic period and continued into the Jōmon period. This is extremely rare in the Kyushu region or indeed anywhere in western Japan west of Aichi Prefecture. The village was constructed in a ring shape of about 100 meters in diameter with earthen storage pits, dug pillar buildings, and pit dwellings centered around a central plaza. The pit dwellings are concentrated on the north and east sides of the ring, and earthen pits are distributed on the outside adjacent to the plaza. There is considerable overlap on the foundations of these structures, indicating that they were rebuilt over centuries of occupation. Some of them were found to contain carbonized nuts, where as other contained bone powder, and thus may have been graves. The plaza itself is thought to be a ritual space, wit a stone arrangement and earthen pits at the center.

On the north side of the ring, dug-out pillared buildings are lined up in an orderly north–south direction. Eleven buildings with dug-out pillars were found in a row and 10 in a ring, but the pillar holes in three of the rows were extremely large, 80 cm in diameter, which is similar to those in eastern Japan. In addition, a road with a hardened surface has been confirmed in the northwestern part of the village.

A large amount of Jōmon pottery was excavated from the southeastern slope, totaling 179,237 pieces with a total weight of 2.8 tons. Most of the excavated artifacts are earthenware, and a high proportion of the stone tools are food processing tools such as grinding stones and stone plates. It is speculated that the village moved westward, based on the fact that ruins and excavated artifacts are most densely distributed on the west side of the village. In addition, 173 impressions of maize weevils were found, accounting for more than half of the total number of maize weevil excavated during the Jōmon period nationwide. In 2016, cockroach egg sacs were discovered in the impressions of Jōmon pottery excavated at this site, and was reported to be the oldest cockroach in Japan. This species cockroach is native to southern China, and it is thought that it may have come to this site by boat.

The site is approximately 18 minutes by car from Tano Station on the JR Kyushu Nippō Main Line.

== See also ==
- List of Historic Sites of Japan (Miyazaki)
