= Imamachi ichirizuka =

Distance marker in Miyazaki Prefecture, Japan

Imamachi Ichirizuka
- 今町一里塚 (Japanese)
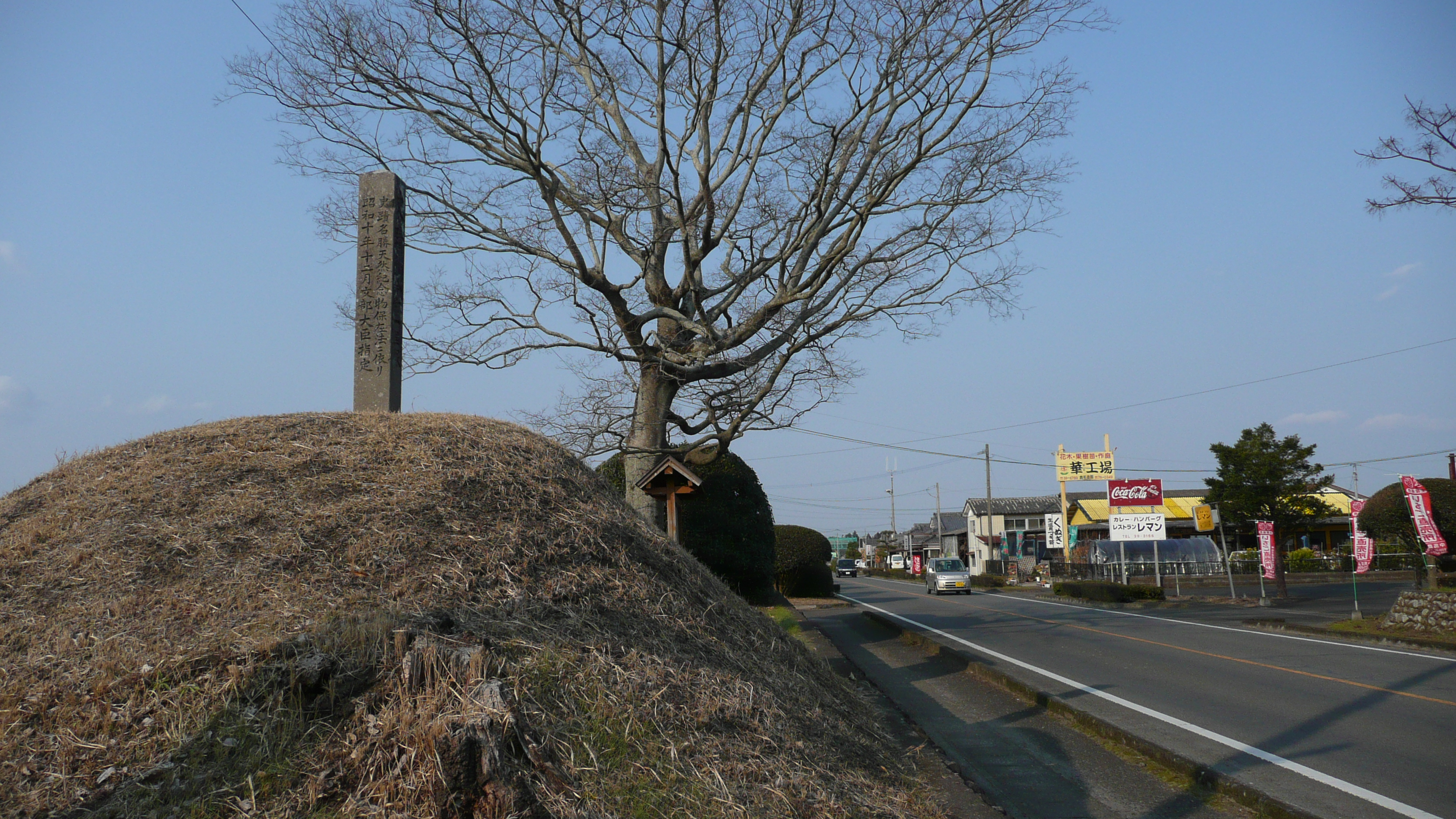
- Imamachi Ichirizuka

- Imamachi Ichirizuka Imamachi ichirizuka (Japan)
- Interactive map of Imamachi Ichirizuka
- 31°40′40″N 131°01′56″E
- Periods: Edo period
- Location: Miyakonojō, Miyazaki, Japan
- Region: Kyushu

Site notes
- Public access: Yes

The Imamachi Ichirizuka (今町一里塚) is a historic Japanese distance marker akin to a milestone, comprising a pair of earthen mounds located in what is now the Imamachi and Umekita neighborhoods of the city of Miyakonojō, Miyazaki Prefecture in Kyushu, Japan. It was designated a National Historic Site of Japan in 1935, with the area under protection expanded in 1973 to include a surviving portion of the tree-lined road.

== Overview ==
During the Edo period the Tokugawa shogunate established ichirizuka on major roads, enabling calculation both of distance travelled and of the charge for transportation by kago or palanquin. These mounds denoted the distance in ri (3.927 kilometres (2.440 mi)) typically to Nihonbashi, the "Bridge of Japan", erected in Edo in 1603. They were typically planted with an enoki or Japanese red pine to provide shelter for travelers. Since the Meiji period, most of the ichirizuka have disappeared, having been destroyed by the elements, modern highway construction and urban encroachment. In 1876, the "Ichirizuka Abolition decree" was issued by the Meiji government and many were demolished at that time. Currently, 17 surviving ichirizuka are designated as national historic sites.

In the case of the Imamachi Ichirizuka the mounds flank the former Imamachi kaidō, a highway which connected Soo, Kagoshima with Miyakonojō, and are located one ri from Miyakonojō, near the border with Kagoshima Prefecture. The former highway is now part of Japan National Route 269. During the Edo period, the area of Miyakonojō was part of Satsuma Domain, and there were twelve roads extending from the jōkamachi of Kagoshima to all parts of the domain. In 1633, when officials from the Tokugawa shogunate came for an inspection of the domain, ichirizuka were erected along three of these roads, with others, including the Imamachi ichirizuka erected in 1709 The Imamachi Ichirizuka are 7.2 meters in diameter and 2.7 meters high, and was planted with sakura on the east side and enoki on the west side.

== See also ==
- List of Historic Sites of Japan (Miyazaki)
