= Jōshinzuka Kofun =

- 常心塚古墳 (Japanese)
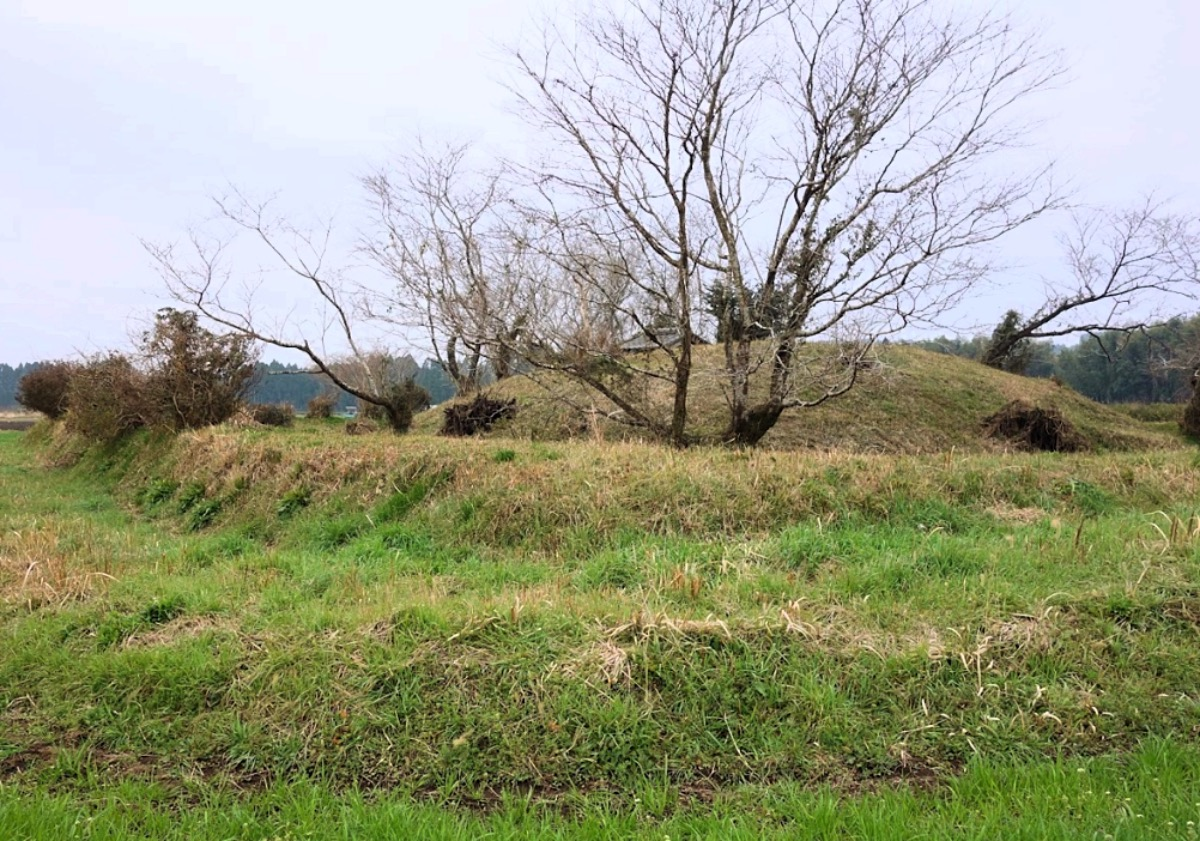
- Jōshinzuka Kofun

- Jōshinzuka Kofun Jōshinzuka Kofun (Japan)
- Interactive map of Jōshinzuka Kofun
- 32°04′23″N 131°19′34″E
- Type: kofun
- Periods: Kofun period
- Location: Saito, Miyazaki, Japan
- Region: Kyushu

History
- Built: c. 7th century AD

Site notes
- Public access: No facilities

The Jōshinzuka Kofun (常心塚古墳) is a Kofun period burial mound located in the Kamisanzai-chō neighborhood of the city of Saito, Miyazaki Prefecture in Kyushu Japan. The tumulus was designated a National Historic Site of Japan in 1980.

== Overview ==
The Jōshinzuka Kofun is a rectangular hōfun (方墳)-style tumulus, located on the left bank of the Sanzai River, at the southwest end of the Azukinohara Plateau at an elevation of 65 meters. It stands in isolation, and the surrounding moat and outer embankment remain almost completely intact. The tumulus measures approximately 24 meters on each side and has a height of 3.3 meters. The surrounding moat is approximately 2 meters wide and the outer embankment is 40 meters on each side, with a height of 1 meter. When the Saito City Board of Education excavated the farm road that runs adjacent to the south side of the burial mound in conjunction with the prefectural farm road maintenance project in 2002, they found a ditch on the outside of the outer embankment. No excavations have been carried out on the mound.

A portion of the stone from the stone burial chamber is exposed, and its shape suggests that the burial facility was a side-pit type stone chamber. It is estimated that it was built in the first half of the 7th century, very late in the Kofun period, when keyhole-shaped tombs were no longer being built. The name of "Jōshinzuka" comes from a legend of a Buddhist monk named Jōshin, who became a sokushinbutsu by walling himself into the burial chamber and reciting sutras until he died. Currently, a small Jizō-dō chapel occupies the southern end of the top of the tomb for memorial purposes.

The tumulus is approximately 19 kilometers northwest of Sadowara Station on the JR Kyushu Nippō Main Line, or ten kilometers southwest of the Saitobaru Kofun Cluster.

== See also ==
- List of Historic Sites of Japan (Miyazaki)
