= Miyazaki (city) =

Capital city of Miyazaki Prefecture in Japan

Miyazaki 宮崎市
- Prefecture capital and Core city
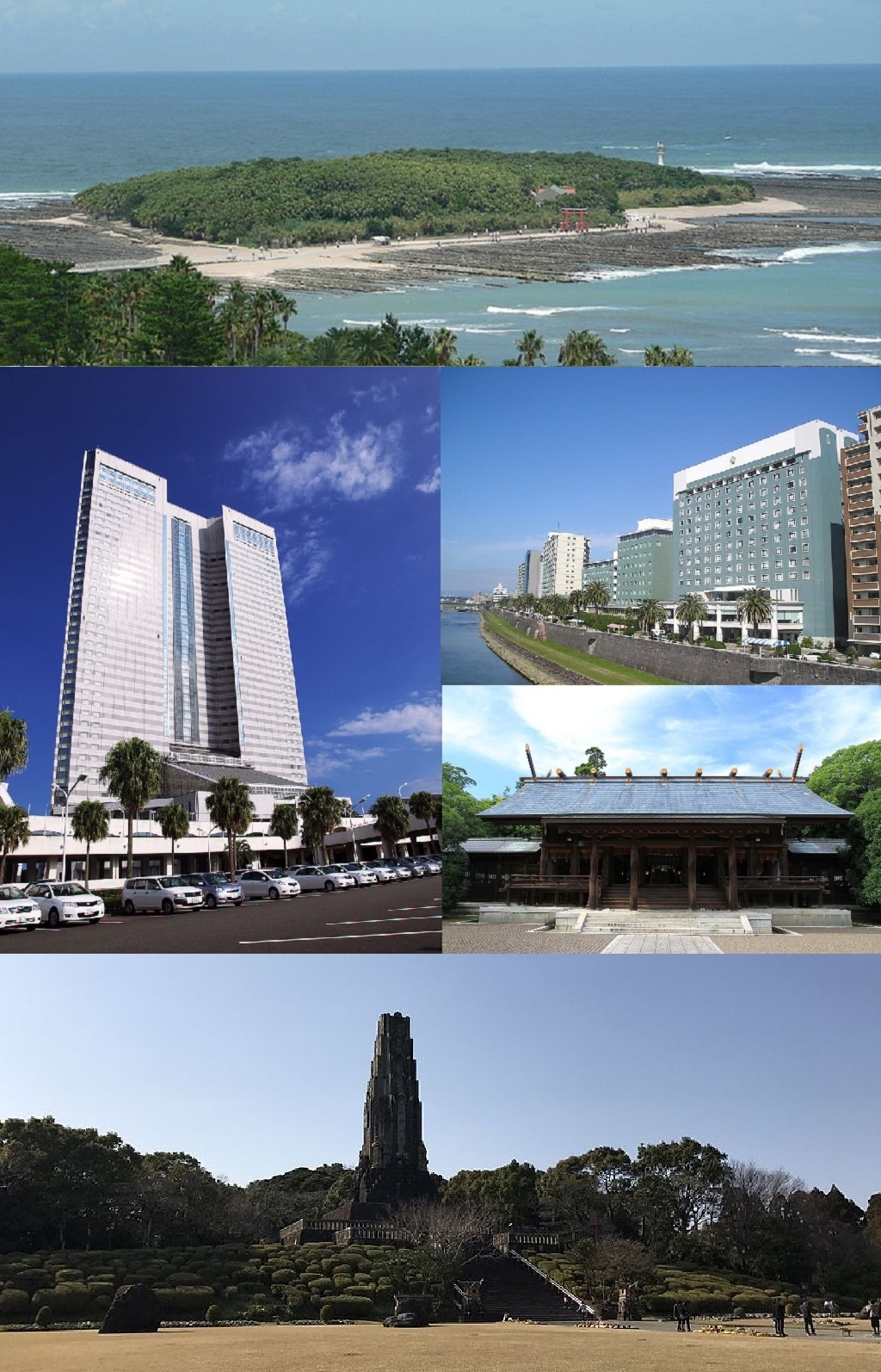
Aoshima Island
Sea Gaia resort	Tachibana Park Street
Sea Gaia resort	Miyazaki Jingū
Heiwadai Park
- Flag Emblem
- Interactive map of Miyazaki
- Location in Japan
- Coordinates: 31°54′28″N 131°25′13″E
- Country: Japan
- Region: Kyushu
- Prefecture: Miyazaki

Government
  - Mayor: Tomonori Kiyoyama

Area
  - Total: 643.67 km^{2} (248.52 sq mi)

Population (September 1, 2023)
  - Total: 397,381
  - Density: 617.37/km^{2} (1,599.0/sq mi)
- Time zone: UTC+09:00 (JST)
- City hall address: 1-1-1 Tachibana-dōri Nishi, Miyazaki-shi, Miyazaki-ken 880-8505
- Climate: Cfa
- Website: www.city.miyazaki.miyazaki.jp
- Symbols
- Flower: Iris ensata, Camellia
- Tree: Cinnamomum camphora

Miyazaki (宮崎市, Miyazaki-shi; Japanese pronunciation: [mʲì.jä́.(d͡)zä̀.k̟ʲì, -(d͡)zä́.k̟ʲi̥.ɕì]) is the capital city of Miyazaki Prefecture on the island of Kyushu in Japan. As of September 1, 2023, the city had an estimated population of 397,381 in 187,859 households, and a population density of 620 persons per km^{2}. The total area of the city is 643.67 km^{2} (248.52 sq mi).

== History ==
The area of Miyazaki was part of ancient Hyūga Province. In 1551, a merchant market town called Jogasaki was established on the south bank of the Ōyodo River near Akae port, and flourished due to trade along the Seto Inland Sea with the Kinai region. This settlement came under the control of Obi Domain ruled by the Itō clan in the Edo period, although much of the rest of the area which is now within the city borders was a patchwork of feudal holdings ruled directly by the Tokugawa shogunate as well as Sadowara Domain, Satsuma Domain and others. With the abolition of the han system in 1871, the Ōyodo River was the border between "Mimitsu Prefecture" and "Miyakonojo Prefecture". When these prefectures were merged in 1873 to form Miyazaki Prefecture, a site near the geographic center was selected as the new capital, and this was the hamlet of Kitta-Beppu, located near the old settlement of Jogasaki. The town of Miyazaki was established on May 1, 1889 with the creation of the modern municipalities system. After the completion of the nationwide railroad system, many new people began to settle in the area.

Miyazaki merged with the neighbouring town of Ōyodo and village of Ōmiya, and was raised to city status on April 1, 1924.

On April 1, 1998, Miyazaki was designated a Core cities of Japan, giving it greater local autonomy.

On January 1, 2006, the towns of Sadowara and Tano (both from Miyazaki District), and the town of Takaoka (from Higashimorokata District) were merged into Miyazaki.

On March 23, 2010, the town of Kiyotake (from Miyazaki District) was merged into Miyazaki. Miyazaki District was dissolved as a result of this merger.

== Geography ==
Miyazaki is located at the southern end of the Miyazaki Plain, with the Ōyodo River flowing through the center and bordered by the Hyūga Sea to the east. Except for the southern part, which is part of the Wanizuka Mountains, most of the area of the city consists of flat alluvial plains.

=== Surrounding municipalities ===
Miyazaki Prefecture

- Aya
- Kobayashi
- Kunitomi
- Mimiata
- Miyakonojō
- Nichinan
- Saito
- Shintomi

=== Climate ===
Miyazaki has a humid subtropical climate with hot, humid summers and cool winters. During the summer, the city is particularly prone to typhoons, one of which drenched the city with 587.2 millimetres (23.12 in) of rain in one day on 16 October 1939. The wettest month since records began has been September 1886 with 1,259.3 millimetres (49.58 in) and the driest was December 1988, which stands as the only month with no measurable precipitation.

Climate data for Miyazaki (1991−2020 normals, extremes 1886−present)
Month	Jan	Feb	Mar	Apr	May	Jun	Jul	Aug	Sep	Oct	Nov	Dec	Year
Record high °C (°F)	25.1 (77.2)	25.4 (77.7)	29.9 (85.8)	31.7 (89.1)	34.3 (93.7)	36.2 (97.2)	38.9 (102.0)	38.0 (100.4)	36.9 (98.4)	33.3 (91.9)	31.0 (87.8)	25.6 (78.1)	38.9 (102.0)
Mean maximum °C (°F)	19.7 (67.5)	21.8 (71.2)	24.0 (75.2)	27.3 (81.1)	30.9 (87.6)	33.2 (91.8)	35.8 (96.4)	35.5 (95.9)	33.6 (92.5)	29.7 (85.5)	25.4 (77.7)	21.0 (69.8)	36.2 (97.2)
Mean daily maximum °C (°F)	13.0 (55.4)	14.1 (57.4)	17.0 (62.6)	21.1 (70.0)	24.6 (76.3)	26.7 (80.1)	31.3 (88.3)	31.6 (88.9)	28.5 (83.3)	24.7 (76.5)	19.8 (67.6)	15.0 (59.0)	22.3 (72.1)
Daily mean °C (°F)	7.8 (46.0)	8.9 (48.0)	12.1 (53.8)	16.4 (61.5)	20.3 (68.5)	23.2 (73.8)	27.3 (81.1)	27.6 (81.7)	24.7 (76.5)	20.0 (68.0)	14.7 (58.5)	9.7 (49.5)	17.7 (63.9)
Mean daily minimum °C (°F)	3.0 (37.4)	4.0 (39.2)	7.4 (45.3)	11.7 (53.1)	16.3 (61.3)	20.1 (68.2)	24.1 (75.4)	24.5 (76.1)	21.4 (70.5)	15.8 (60.4)	10.1 (50.2)	5.0 (41.0)	13.6 (56.5)
Mean minimum °C (°F)	−2.2 (28.0)	−1.3 (29.7)	0.9 (33.6)	4.8 (40.6)	11.1 (52.0)	15.8 (60.4)	20.9 (69.6)	21.9 (71.4)	16.0 (60.8)	9.5 (49.1)	3.3 (37.9)	−1.0 (30.2)	−2.6 (27.3)
Record low °C (°F)	−7.5 (18.5)	−6.6 (20.1)	−4.1 (24.6)	−1.5 (29.3)	3.1 (37.6)	9.2 (48.6)	16.0 (60.8)	16.4 (61.5)	9.7 (49.5)	2.6 (36.7)	−2.7 (27.1)	−7.2 (19.0)	−7.5 (18.5)
Average precipitation mm (inches)	72.7 (2.86)	95.8 (3.77)	155.7 (6.13)	194.5 (7.66)	227.6 (8.96)	516.3 (20.33)	339.3 (13.36)	275.5 (10.85)	370.9 (14.60)	196.7 (7.74)	105.7 (4.16)	74.9 (2.95)	2,625.5 (103.37)
Average snowfall cm (inches)	0 (0)	0 (0)	0 (0)	0 (0)	0 (0)	0 (0)	0 (0)	0 (0)	0 (0)	0 (0)	0 (0)	0 (0)	0 (0)
Average precipitation days (≥ 0.5 mm)	6.6	8.1	11.5	11.2	11.4	17.2	12.8	13.1	13.6	9.2	8.1	6.1	128.9
Average relative humidity (%)	66	67	68	70	74	82	78	80	80	76	74	69	74
Mean monthly sunshine hours	192.6	170.8	185.6	186.0	179.7	119.4	198.0	208.6	156.5	173.6	167.0	183.9	2,121.7
Source: Japan Meteorological Agency

Climate data for Miyazaki Airport (2003−2020 normals, extremes 2003−present)
Month	Jan	Feb	Mar	Apr	May	Jun	Jul	Aug	Sep	Oct	Nov	Dec	Year
Record high °C (°F)	24.3 (75.7)	25.0 (77.0)	30.0 (86.0)	31.3 (88.3)	35.4 (95.7)	34.8 (94.6)	39.6 (103.3)	38.6 (101.5)	35.2 (95.4)	33.1 (91.6)	31.6 (88.9)	25.3 (77.5)	39.6 (103.3)
Mean daily maximum °C (°F)	13.0 (55.4)	14.4 (57.9)	17.2 (63.0)	21.3 (70.3)	24.4 (75.9)	26.5 (79.7)	30.8 (87.4)	31.4 (88.5)	28.6 (83.5)	24.6 (76.3)	20.0 (68.0)	15.0 (59.0)	22.3 (72.1)
Daily mean °C (°F)	8.0 (46.4)	9.6 (49.3)	12.4 (54.3)	16.7 (62.1)	20.5 (68.9)	23.2 (73.8)	27.2 (81.0)	27.9 (82.2)	25.2 (77.4)	20.6 (69.1)	15.4 (59.7)	9.9 (49.8)	18.1 (64.5)
Mean daily minimum °C (°F)	3.4 (38.1)	4.9 (40.8)	7.6 (45.7)	12.1 (53.8)	16.8 (62.2)	20.4 (68.7)	24.3 (75.7)	25.0 (77.0)	22.1 (71.8)	16.6 (61.9)	10.9 (51.6)	5.2 (41.4)	14.1 (57.4)
Record low °C (°F)	−3.9 (25.0)	−3.8 (25.2)	−1.1 (30.0)	3.2 (37.8)	8.0 (46.4)	14.3 (57.7)	18.1 (64.6)	20.1 (68.2)	13.7 (56.7)	6.8 (44.2)	0.8 (33.4)	−2.9 (26.8)	−3.9 (25.0)
Average precipitation mm (inches)	68.2 (2.69)	111.9 (4.41)	144.1 (5.67)	166.9 (6.57)	225.1 (8.86)	505.9 (19.92)	320.9 (12.63)	261.8 (10.31)	390.7 (15.38)	240.6 (9.47)	126.8 (4.99)	83.6 (3.29)	2,646.5 (104.19)
Average precipitation days (≥ 1.0 mm)	5.6	8.5	9.9	9.3	10.3	16.9	10.8	12.7	13.7	8.7	8.1	5.4	119.9
Source: Japan Meteorological Agency

=== Demographics ===
Per Japanese census data, the population of Miyazaki in 2020 is 401,339 people. Miyazaki has been conducting censuses since 1920.

Historical population

Year	Pop.	±%
1920	112,288	—
1925	121,627	+8.3%
1930	142,950	+17.5%
1935	148,177	+3.7%
1940	151,106	+2.0%
1945	191,775	+26.9%
1950	205,562	+7.2%
1955	218,601	+6.3%
1960	224,498	+2.7%
1965	236,660	+5.4%
1970	255,888	+8.1%

Year	Pop.	±%
1975	291,157	+13.8%
1980	329,751	+13.3%
1985	349,465	+6.0%
1990	365,080	+4.5%
1995	384,391	+5.3%
2000	392,178	+2.0%
2005	395,593	+0.9%
2010	400,352	+1.2%
2015	401,138	+0.2%
2020	401,339	+0.1%

Miyazaki population statistics

== Government ==
Miyazaki has a mayor-council form of government with a directly elected mayor and a unicameral city council of 40 members. Miyazaki contributes 12 members to the Miyazaki Prefectural Assembly. In terms of national politics, the city is part of the Miyazaki 1st district of the lower house of the Diet of Japan.

== Economy ==
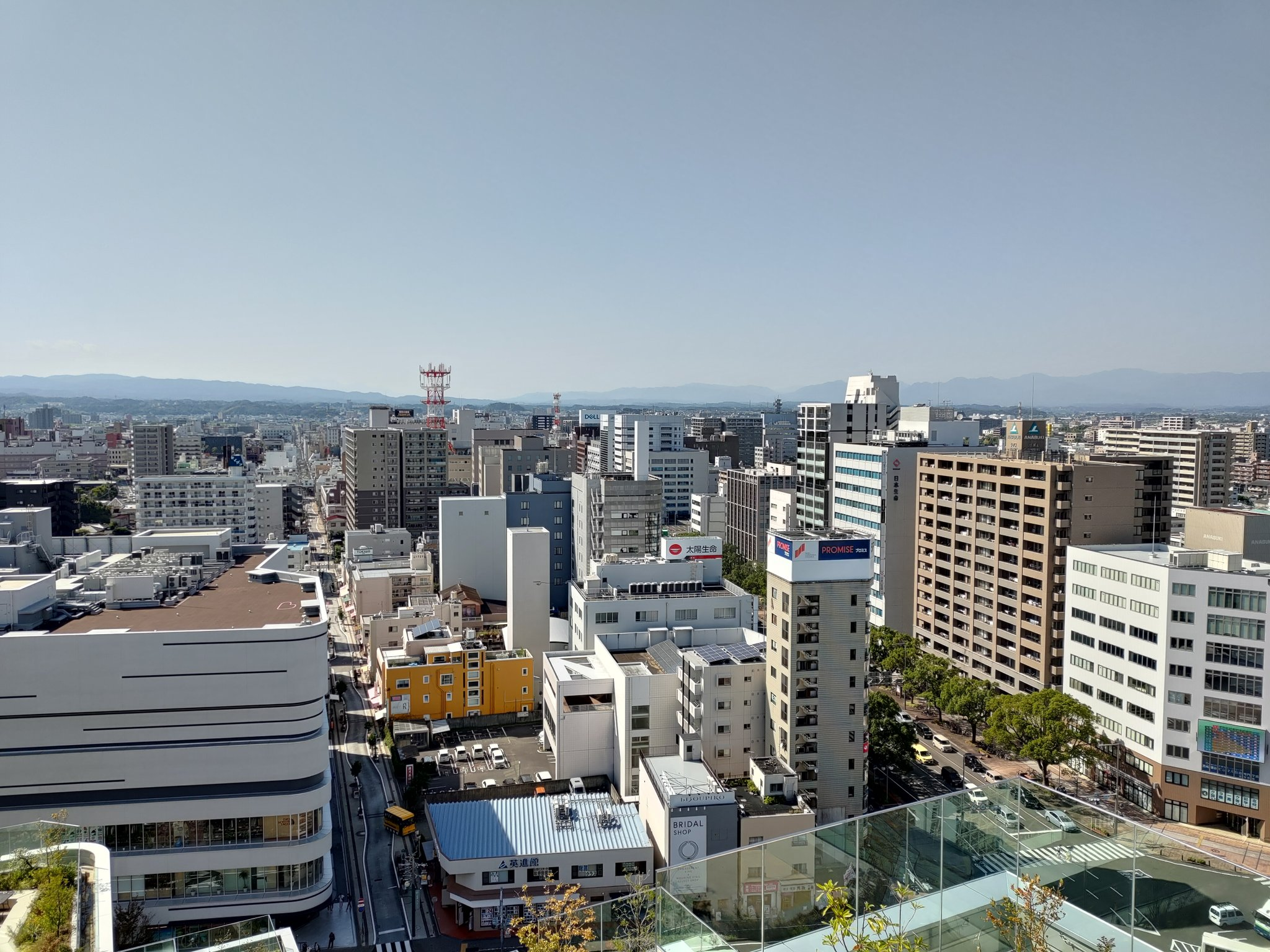
Downtown of Miyazaki

Miyazaki is primarily a regional commercial center. Although eastern Miyazaki is designated as the "Miyazaki SUN Technopolis area", there is no large-scale industry in Miyazaki City as the city is hampered by poor transportation and logistics connections with other areas of Japan. In recent years, the city has been actively attracting the information industry. Rural parts of the city are still agricultural, cultivation of tomatoes, peppers, cucumbers, and other crops, and food processing factories. Solaseed Air, a regional airline, has its head office in Miyazaki.

== Education ==
=== Colleges and universities ===
- Minami Kyushu Junior College
- Minami Kyushu University
- Miyazaki Gakuen Junior College
- Miyazaki International College
- Miyazaki Municipal University
- Miyazaki Prefectural Nursing University
- Miyazaki Sangyo-keiei University
- University of Miyazaki

=== Primary and secondary schools ===
Miyazaki has 48 public elementary schools and 25 public junior high schools operated by the city government and one public junior high school and ten public high schools operated by the Miyazaki Prefectural Board of Education. There is also one national elementary school and one national junior high school affiliated with Miyazaki University. The city has seven private junior high schools and eight private high schools. The prefecture operates five special education schools for the handicapped.

== Transportation ==
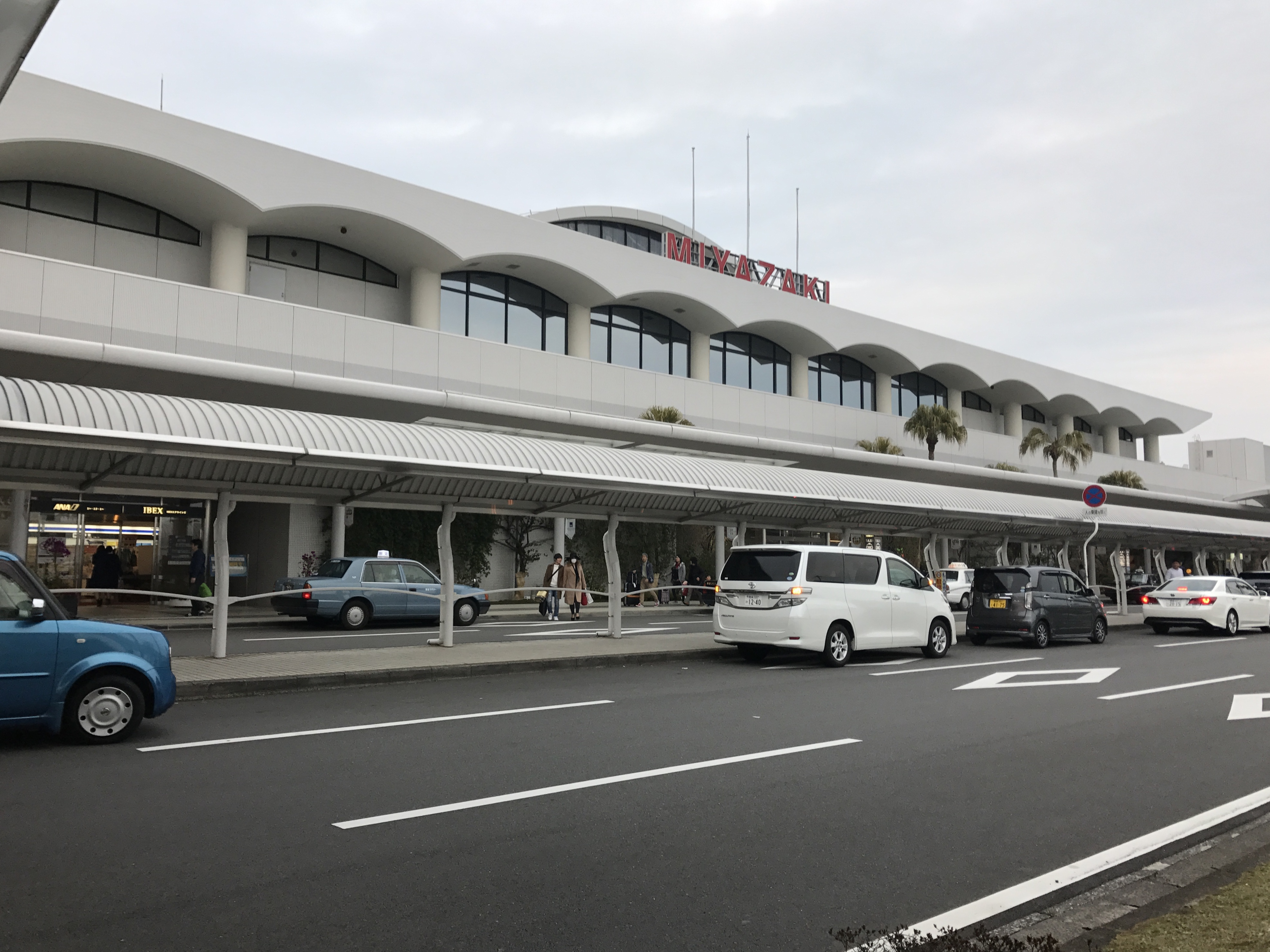
Miyazaki Airport

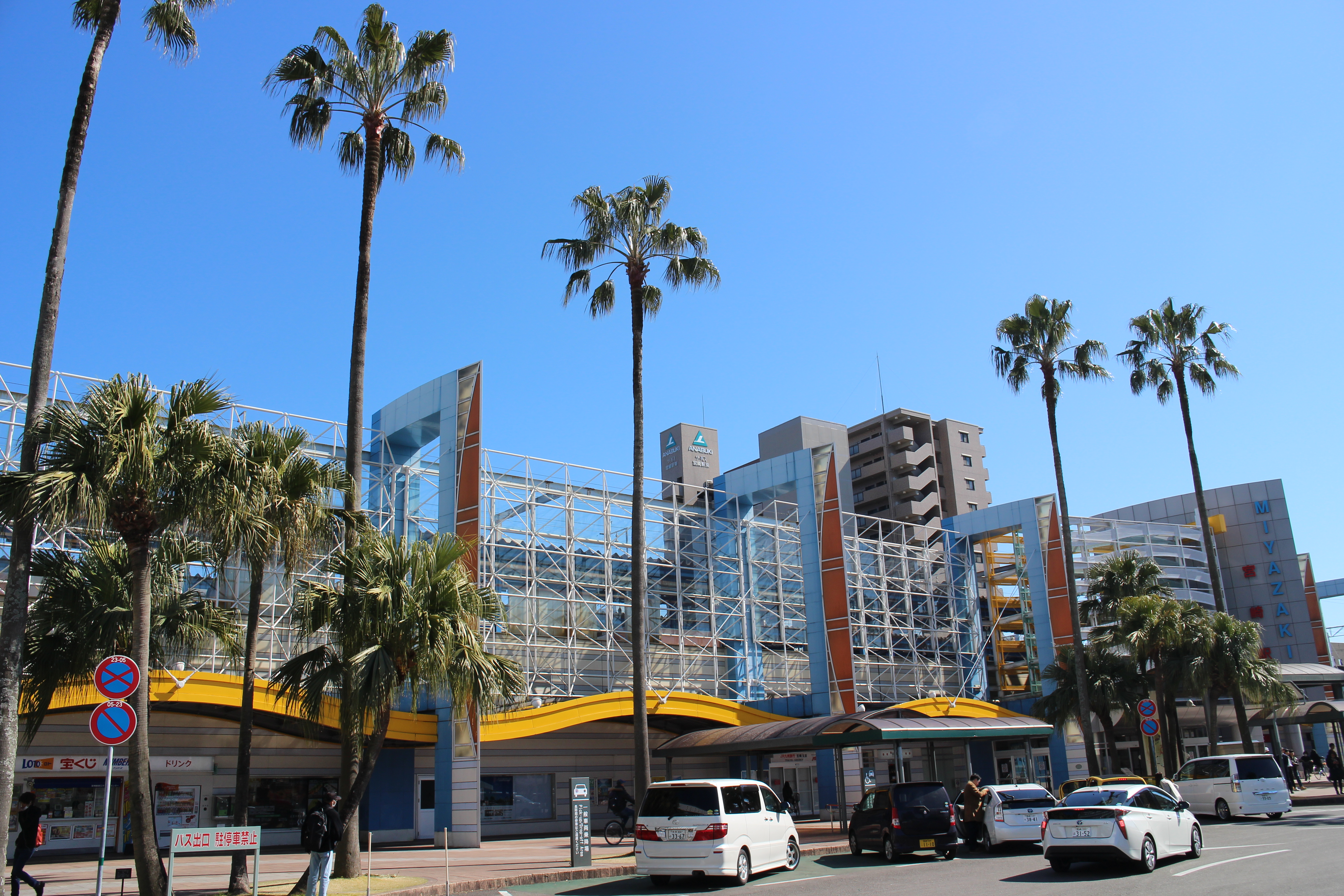
Miyazaki Station

=== Airports ===
- Miyazaki Airport

=== Railways ===
JR Kyushu - Nippō Main Line

- Sadowara - Hyūga-Sumiyoshi - Hasugaike - Miyazaki-Jingū - Miyazaki - Minami-Miyazaki - Kanō - Kiyotake - Hyūga-Kutsukake - Tano

JR Kyushu - Nichinan Line

- Minami-Miyazaki - Tayoshi - Minamikata - Kibana - Undōkōen - Sosanji - Kodomonokuni - Aoshima - Oryūzako - Uchiumi - Kouchiumi

JR Kyushu - Miyazaki Kūkō Line

- (Minami-Miyazaki) - Tayoshi - Miyazaki Airport

=== Highways ===
- Miyazaki Expressway
- Higashikyushu Expressway
- National Route 10
- National Route 219
- National Route 220
- National Route 268
- National Route 269
- National Route 448
- National Route 220
- National Route 268

== Sister cities ==
Miyazaki has five sister cities:

=== National ===
- (Nara Prefecture) Kashihara, Nara, since February 11, 1966
- (Kōchi Prefecture) Tano, Kōchi, since July 8, 1989
- (Akita Prefecture) Daisen, Akita, since June 3, 2001

=== International ===
- Waukegan, Illinois, United States, since May 3, 1990
- Virginia Beach, Virginia, United States, since May 25, 1992
- Boeun County, North Chungcheong, South Korea, since August 6, 1993
- Huludao, Liaoning, China, since May 16, 2004
- Taoyuan, Taiwan, since October 5, 2017

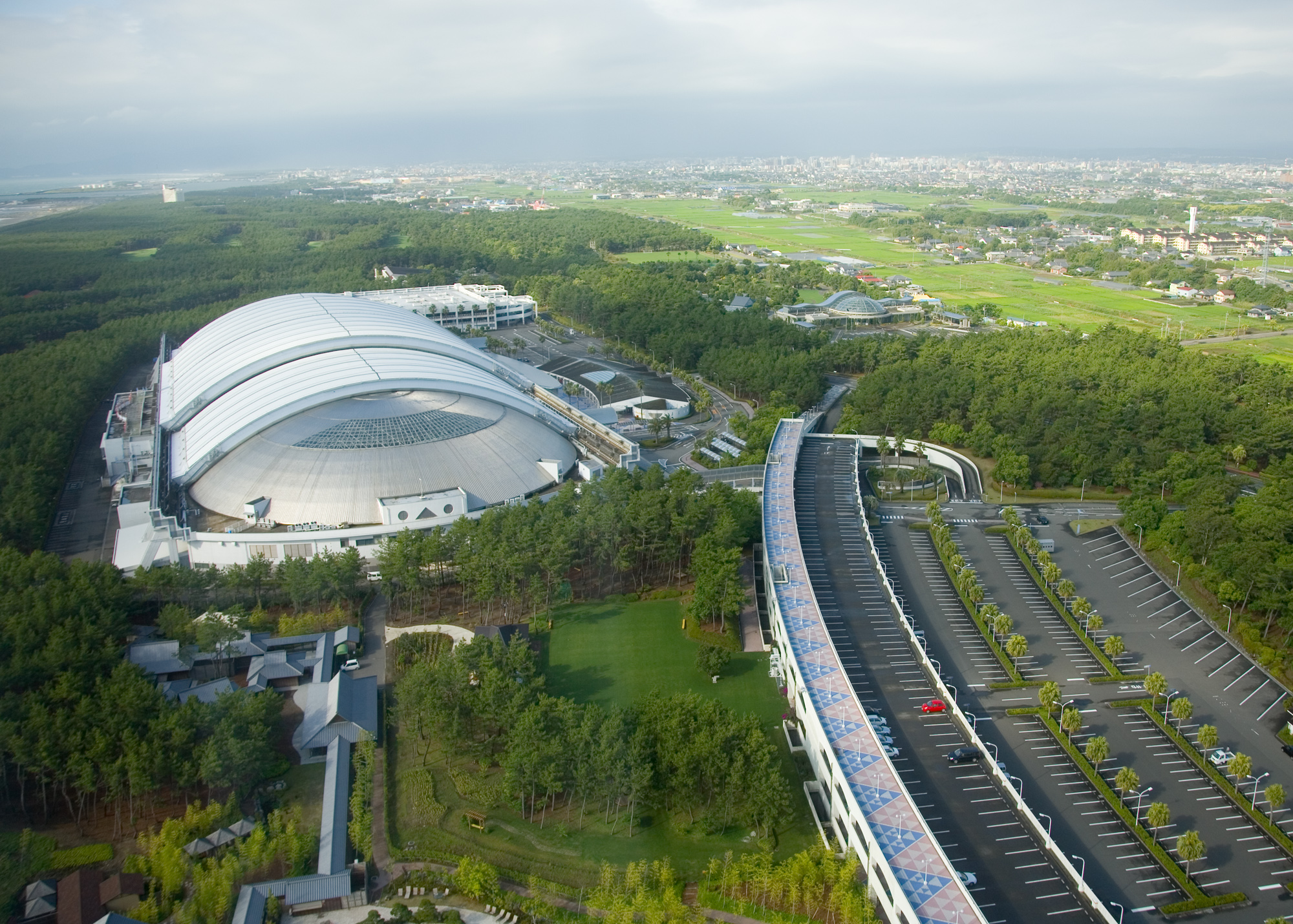
Miyazaki Sea Gaia and Ocean Dome.

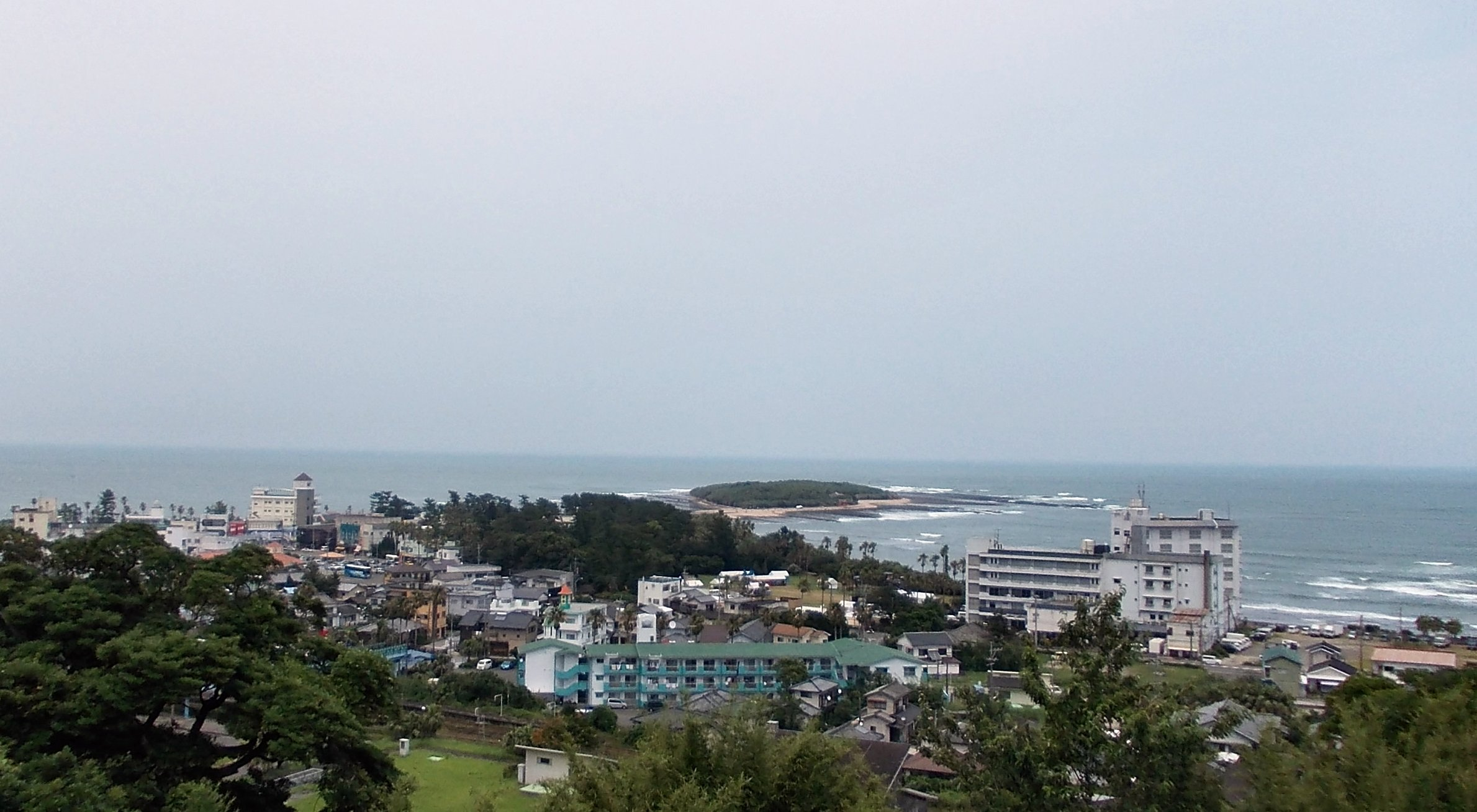
Aoshima and resort area.

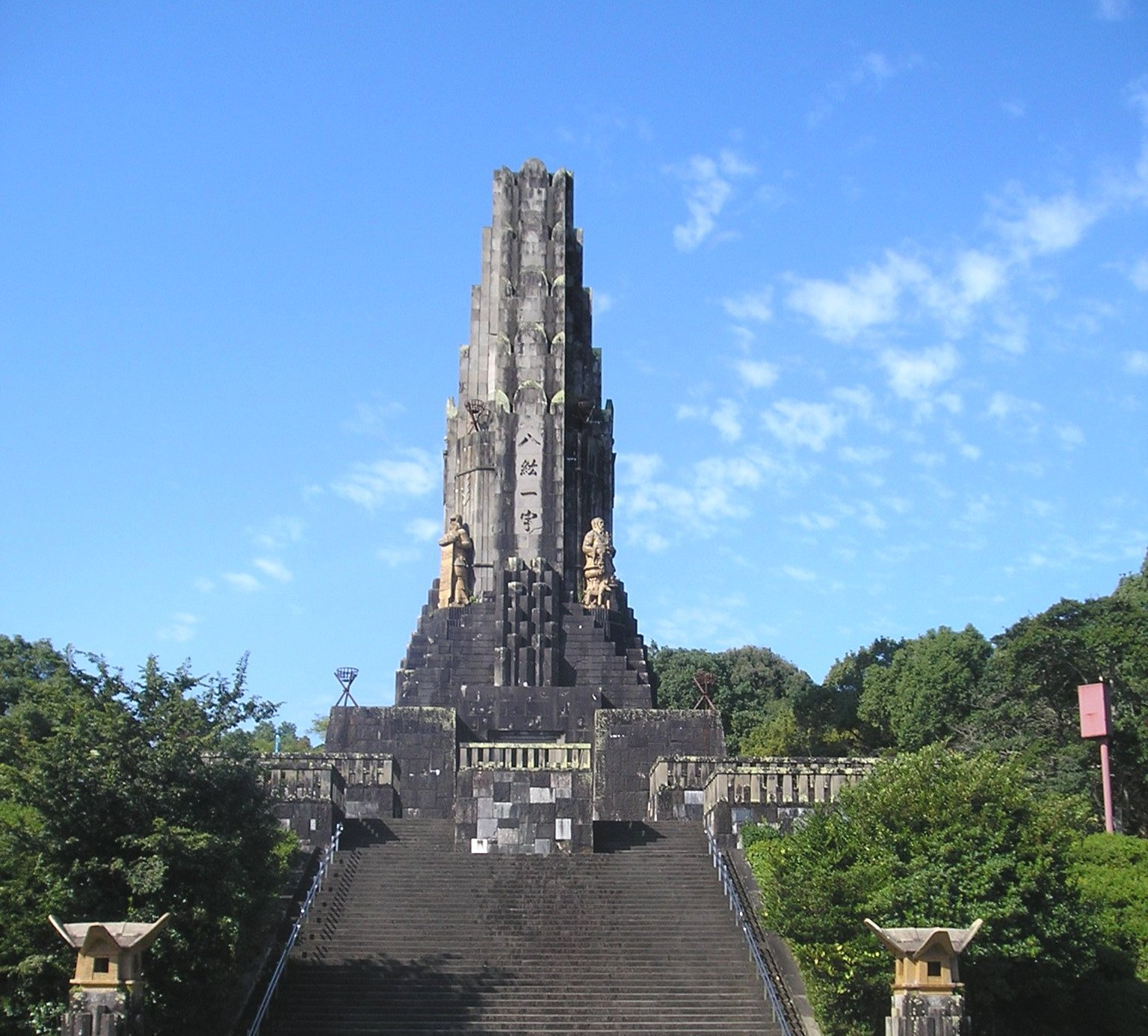
Peace tower with the motto "Hakkō ichiu".

== Main sights ==
- Miyazaki Prefectural Office became famous as a tourist spot when Hideo Higashikokubaru, a national celebrity, became the prefectural governor of Miyazaki.
- Miyazaki-jingū, a shrine in the city's centre, is one of Miyazaki's sacred dedications to Japan's first emperor, Jinmu.
- Heiwadai Tower or "Peace Tower" (also known as the Hakkō ichiu monument), in the expansive Heiwadai Park, is a must-see for tourists. Originally the "Tower of the Emperor," symbolizing Japanese imperial expansion, it was renamed for peace after the events of World War II.
- Aoshima Island and shrine boasts some rare rock formations known as the Devil's Washboard among a peaceful beach setting, and it is a popular relaxation and play destination for locals and travellers alike. The Aoshima Subtropical Botanical Garden is also located nearby and is free to the public, including their greenhouse which features colourful lighting during some summer evenings.
- The Tom Watson Golf Course was produced by Tom Watson, an American professional golfer.
- Phoenix Zoo is a combination live animal zoo and child-centred amusement park.
- The Citizen's Forest is a large park near the Phoenix Zoo. Located on its grounds is the Misogi-ike, Pond of Purification, that is the birthplace of the sun goddess Amaterasu according to legend.
- The Ikime Kofun Cluster includes the Ikime-no-mori Yukokan, Activity Centre, where visitors learn the history of the burial mounds and learn about ancient activities.
- Kisakihama Beach, Aoshima Beach, and Shirahama Beach are surfing spots within the city limits.
- Kaeda Valley is a free public park and natural reserve featuring walking paths and hiking trails (various difficulty levels and estimated times to completion). Kaeda is a forested area with a river running through it.
- The Kirishima Sports Complex consists of various athletic facilities, such as running trails, a stadium, tennis courts, an outdoor ropes course, etc. as well as some indoor meeting space. The complex hosts various sports games/matches and events throughout the year, including the Aoshima Taiheiyo Marathon.
- Florante Miyazaki is a botanical park that features floral displays and a popular winter lights display.
- Birthplace of Yasui Sokken, National Historic Site
- Sadowara Castle ruins, National Historic Site
- Mukasa Castle ruins, National Historic Site
- Motonobaru Site, National Historic Site
- Udo Shrine, National Historic Site
- Ikime Shrine, dedicated to Emperor Ōjin and Taira no Kagekiyo

== People ==
- Yui Asaka (singer and actress)
- Sky Brown (skateboarder)
- Ryunosuke Haga (judoka)
- Kosei Inoue (judoka)
- Shinzo Koroki (soccer player)
- Kawaguchi Yurina (singer, former member of X21)
- Makoto Nishimoto (former city councilor)
