= Ōyodo River =

Ōyodo River Ōyodo-gawa
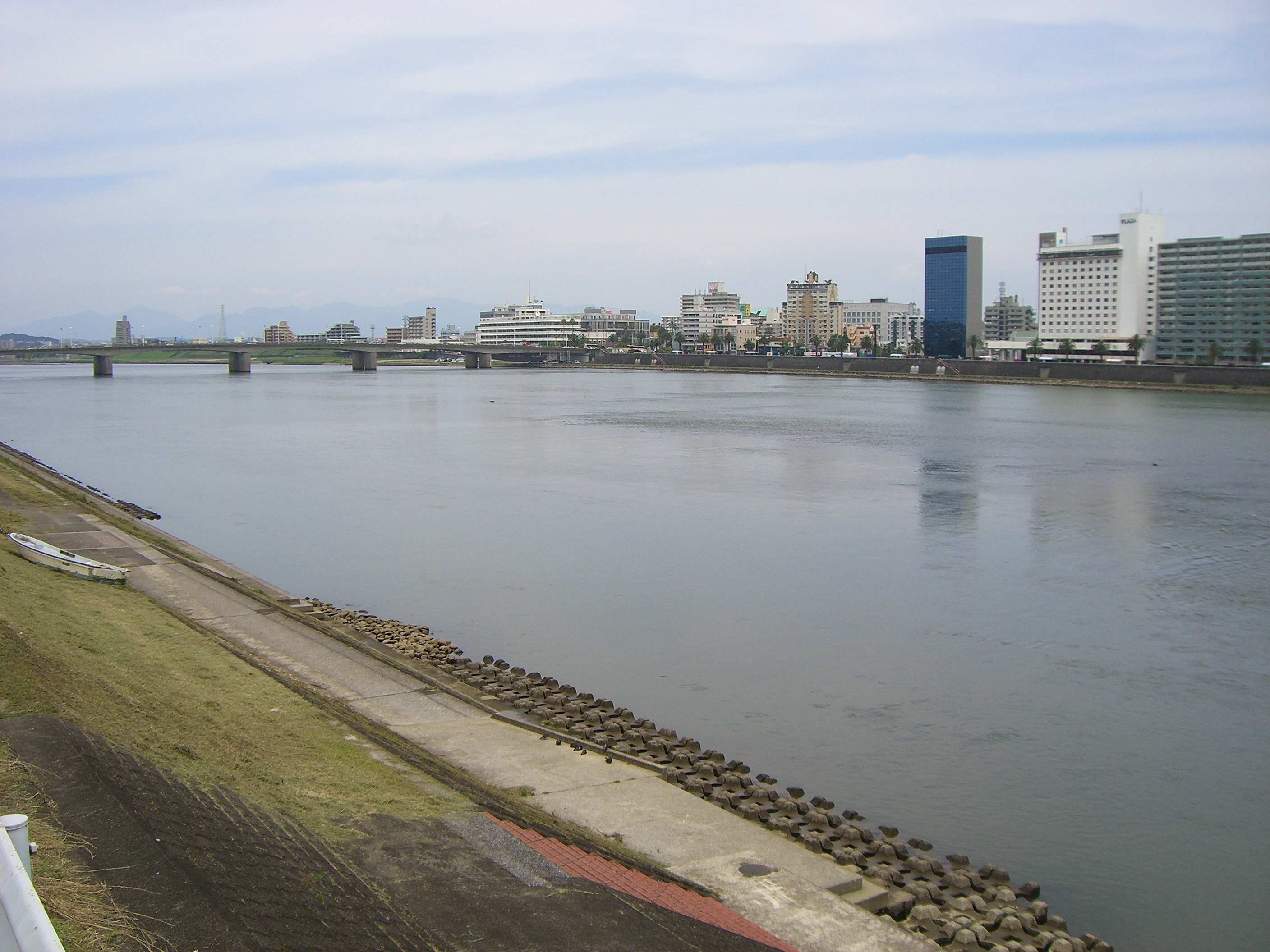
- Ōyodo River in Miyazaki, Miyazaki Prefecture.

- Location within Japan
- Native name: 大淀川 (Japanese)

Location
- Country: Japan
- Prefectures: Kagoshima; Miyazaki

Physical characteristics
- Mouth: Sea of Hyūga, Pacific Ocean
  - location: Miyazaki
  - coordinates: 31°53′42″N 131°27′22″E
  - elevation: 0 m (0 ft)
- Length: 107 km (66 mi)
- Basin size: 2,230 km^{2} (860 sq mi)
- Discharge
  - average: 105.86 m^{3}/s (3,738 cu ft/s)

Basin features
- River system: Ōyodo River
- Population: 603,018

The Ōyodo River (大淀川, Ōyodo-gawa) is a Class A river which runs through Kagoshima Prefecture and Miyazaki Prefecture in Japan and ultimately drains into the Pacific Ocean.

== River communities ==
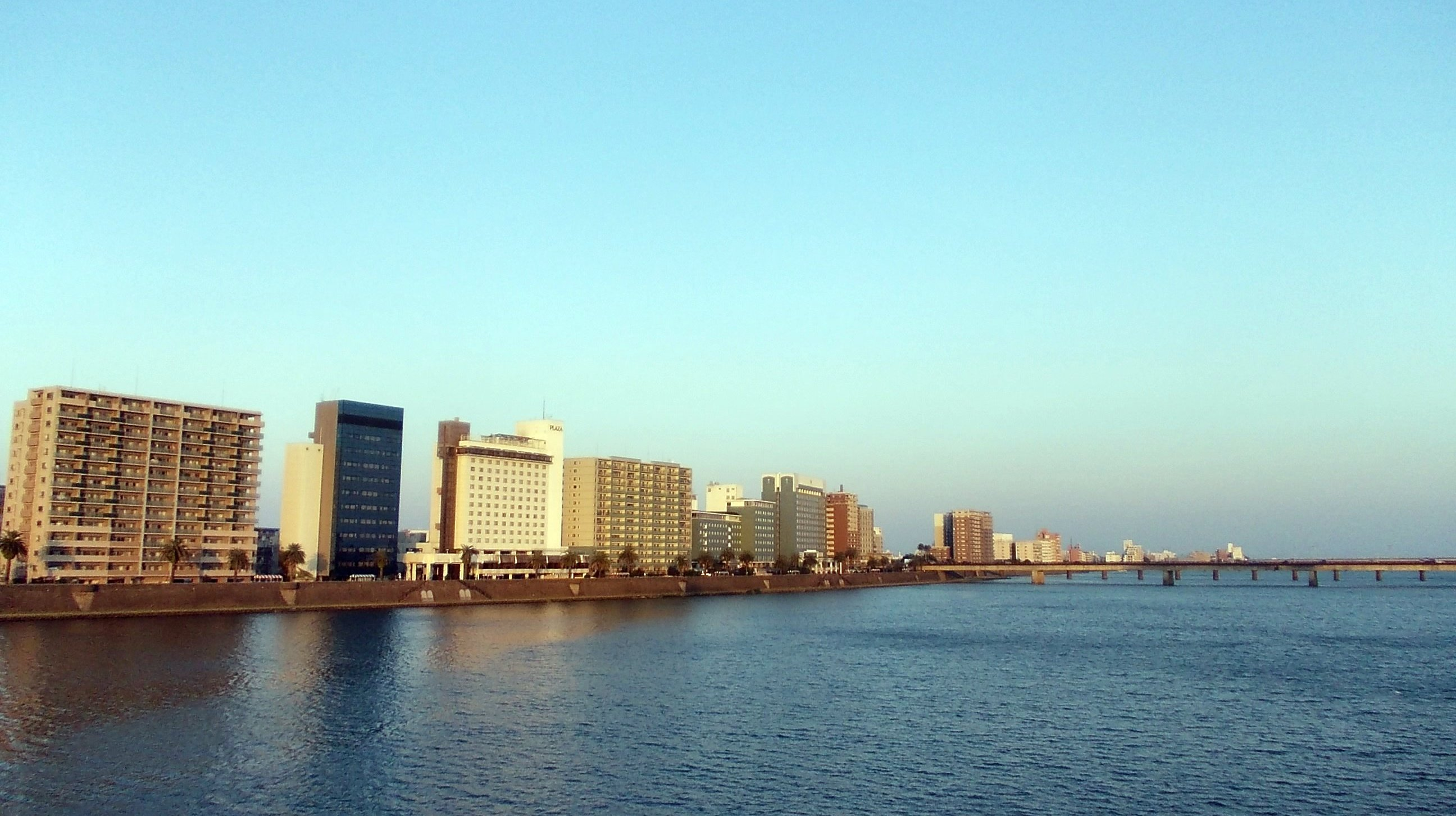
The Ōyodo River passing through the city of Miyazaki

The river passes through or forms the boundary of the following communities:

Kagoshima Prefecture
Soo
Miyazaki Prefecture
Miyakonojō, Kobayashi, Miyazaki
