= Hyūga-Ōtsuka Station =

Railway station in Kushima, Miyazaki Prefecture, Japan

Hyūga-Ōtsuka Station 日向大束駅
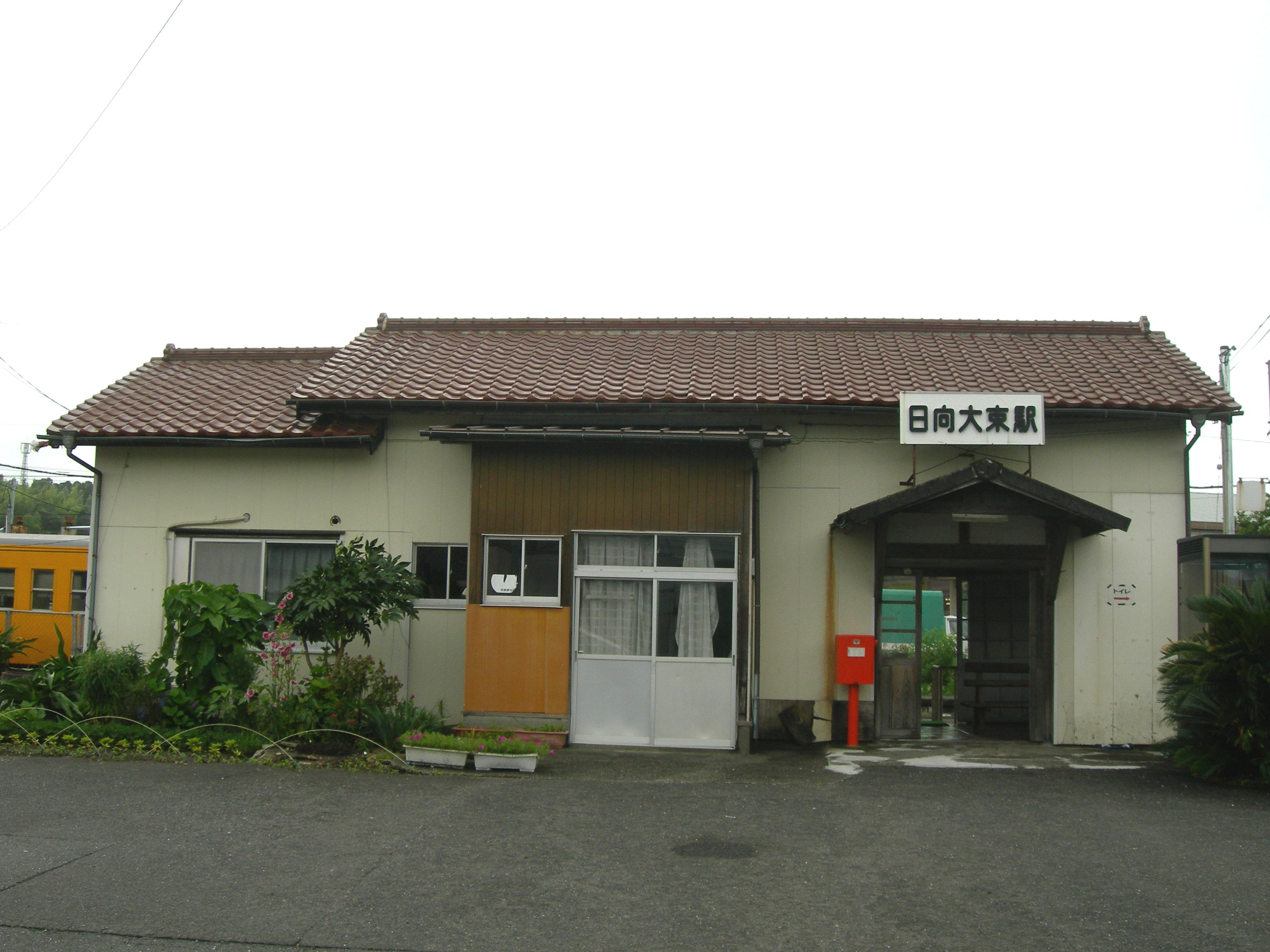
- Hyūga-Ōtsuka Station in 2010

General information
- Location: Naru, Kushima-shi, Miyazaki-ken 889-3531; Japan
- Coordinates: 31°30′38″N 131°14′55″E
- Operator: JR Kyushu
- Line: ■ Nichinan Line
- Distance: 68.6 km from Minami-Miyazaki
- Platforms: 2 side platforms
- Tracks: 2

Construction
- Structure type: At grade

Other information
- Status: Unstaffed
- Website: Official website

History
- Opened: 15 April 1935

Passengers
- FY2016: 24 daily

Services
Preceding station	JR Kyushu	Following station
Yowara towards Minami-Miyazaki	Nichinan Line	Hyūga-Kitakata towards Shibushi
Location
- Location within Miyazaki Prefecture Location within Japan

Hyūga-Ōtsuka Station (日向大束駅, Hyūga-Ōtsuka-eki) is a passenger railway station located in the city of Kushima, Miyazaki Prefecture, Japan. It is operated by JR Kyushu.

== Lines ==
The station is served by the Nichinan Line and is located 68.6 km from the starting point of the line at Minami-Miyazaki.

== Layout ==
The station consists of two side platforms serving two tracks at grade. The station building is a simple wooden structure in Japanese style with a tile roof. It is unstaffed and serves only as a waiting room. Access to the opposite side platform is by means of a level crossing. A bike shed is available at the station forecourt.

=== Platforms ===
East (station side)	■ ■ Nichinan Line	for Kushima and Shibushi
West	■ ■ Nichinan Line	for Aburatsu and Minami-Miyazaki

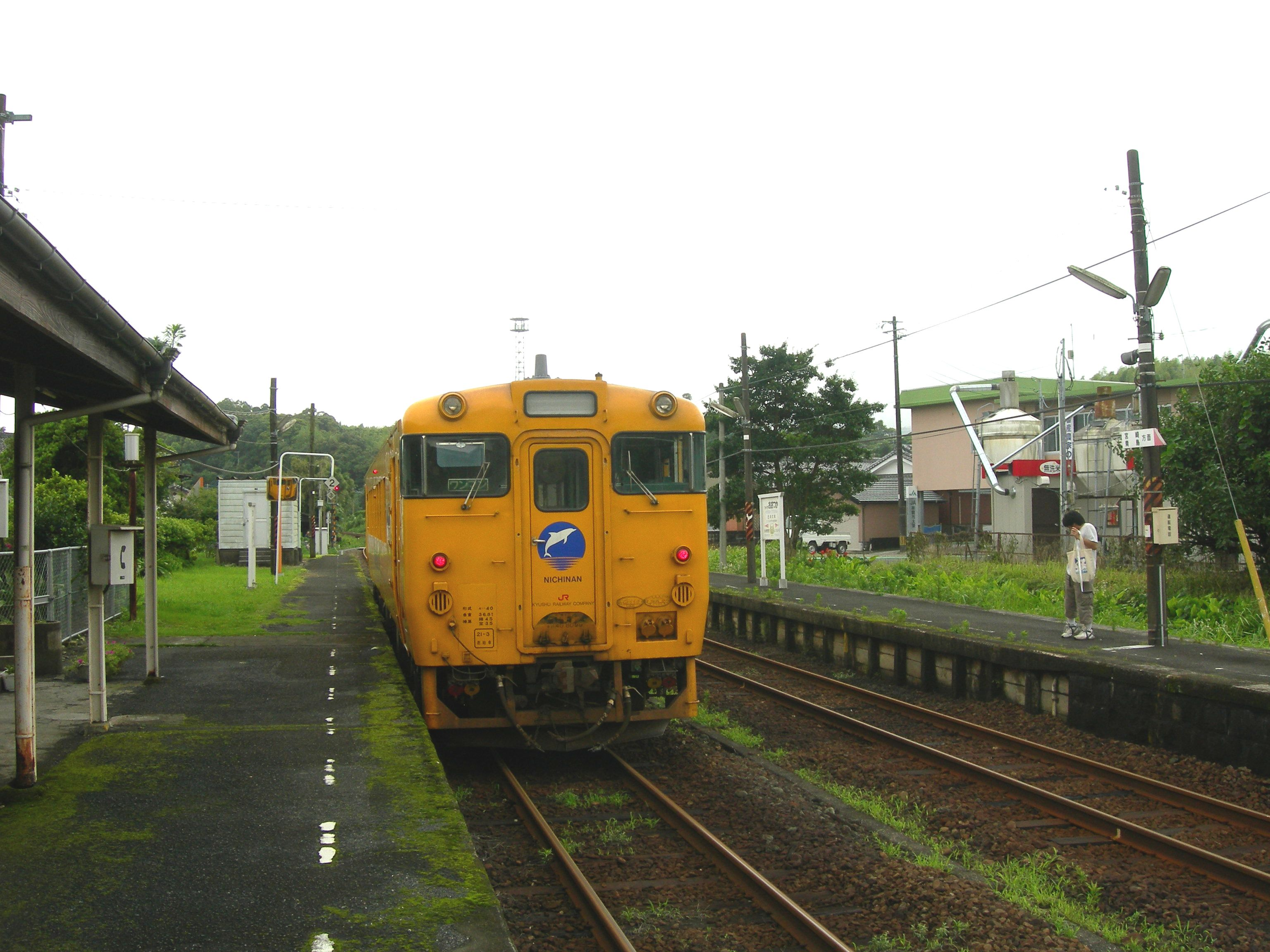
A view of the station platforms and tracks.

== History ==
Japanese Government Railways (JGR) had opened the Shibushi Line from Nishi-Miyakonojō to Sueyoshi (now closed) in 1923. By 1925, the line had been extended eastwards to the east coast of Kyushu at Shibushi. The line was then extended northwards in phases. The first major phase of expansion added 28.5 km of track and several stations, reaching Yowara, which opened as the new northern terminus on 15 April 1935. Hyūga-Ōtsuka was one of the intermediate stations which opened on the same day. Freight operations were discontinued in 1961 and baggage handling in 1985. On 8 May 1963, the route was designated the Nichinan Line on 8 May 1963. With the privatization of Japanese National Railways (JNR), the successor of JGR, on 1 April 1987, the station came under the control of JR Kyushu.

== Passenger statistics ==
In fiscal 2016, the station was used by an average of 24 passengers (boarding only) per day.

== Surrounding area ==
- Japan National Route 220
- Kushima City Hall Otsuka Branch

== See also ==
- List of railway stations in Japan
