= Yowara Station =

Railway station in Nichinan, Miyazaki Prefecture, Japan

Yowara Station 榎原駅
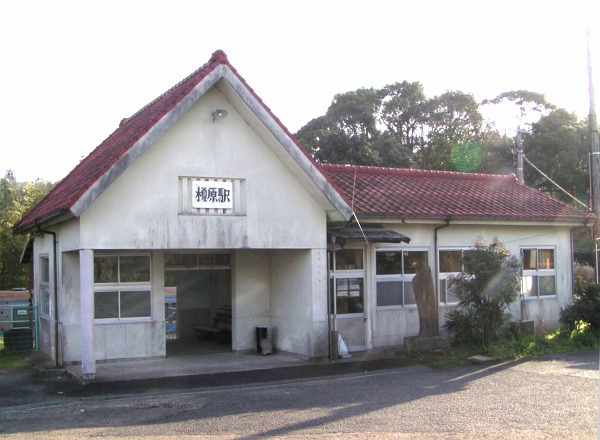
- Yowara Station in 2005

General information
- Location: Ko Nangocho Yowara, Nichinan-shi, Miyazaki-ken 889-3215; Japan
- Coordinates: 31°32′05″N 131°18′23″E
- Operator: JR Kyushu
- Line: ■ Nichinan Line
- Distance: 60.5 km from Minami-Miyazaki
- Platforms: 2 side platforms
- Tracks: 2 + 1 siding

Construction
- Structure type: At grade

Other information
- Status: Unstaffed
- Website: Official website

History
- Opened: 15 April 1935

Passengers
- FY2016: 9 daily

Services
Preceding station	JR Kyushu	Following station
Taninokuchi towards Minami-Miyazaki	Nichinan Line	Hyūga-Ōtsuka towards Shibushi
Location
- Location within Miyazaki Prefecture Location within Japan

Yowara Station (榎原駅, Yowara-eki) is a passenger railway station located in the city of Nichinan, Miyazaki Prefecture, Japan. It is operated by JR Kyushu and is on the Nichinan Line.

== Lines ==
The station is served by the Nichinan Line and is located 60.5 km from the starting point of the line at Minami-Miyazaki.

== Layout ==
The station consists of two side platforms serving two tracks at grade with a siding. The station building is a simple wooden structure with a tile roof and is located at a slightly higher level than the platforms and tracks. It is unstaffed and serves only as a waiting room. After the ticket gate, a short flight of steps leads down to a side platform. Access to the opposite side platform is by means of a level crossing.

=== Platforms ===
North (station side)	■ ■ Nichinan Line	for Aburatsu and Minami-Miyazaki
South	■ ■ Nichinan Line	for Kushima and Shibushi

== History ==
Japanese Government Railways (JGR) had opened the Shibushi Line from Nishi-Miyakonojō to Sueyoshi (now closed) in 1923. By 1925, the line had been extended eastwards to the east coast of Kyushu at Shibushi. The line was then extended northwards in phases. The first major phase of expansion added 28.5 km of track and several stations, reaching Yowara, which opened as the new northern terminus on 15 April 1935. Freight operations were discontinued in 1960. On 8 May 1963, the route was designated the Nichinan Line on 8 May 1963. With the privatization of Japanese National Railways (JNR), the successor of JGR, on 1 April 1987, the station came under the control of JR Kyushu.

== Passenger statistics ==
In fiscal 2016, the station was used by an average of 9 passengers (boarding only) per day.

== Surrounding area ==
- Nichinan City Yowara Elementary School
- Nichinan City Yowara Junior High School
- Nichinan City Hall Yowara Branch

== See also ==
- List of railway stations in Japan
