= Uchinoda Station =

Railway station in Nichinan, Miyazaki Prefecture, Japan

Uchinoda Station 内之田駅
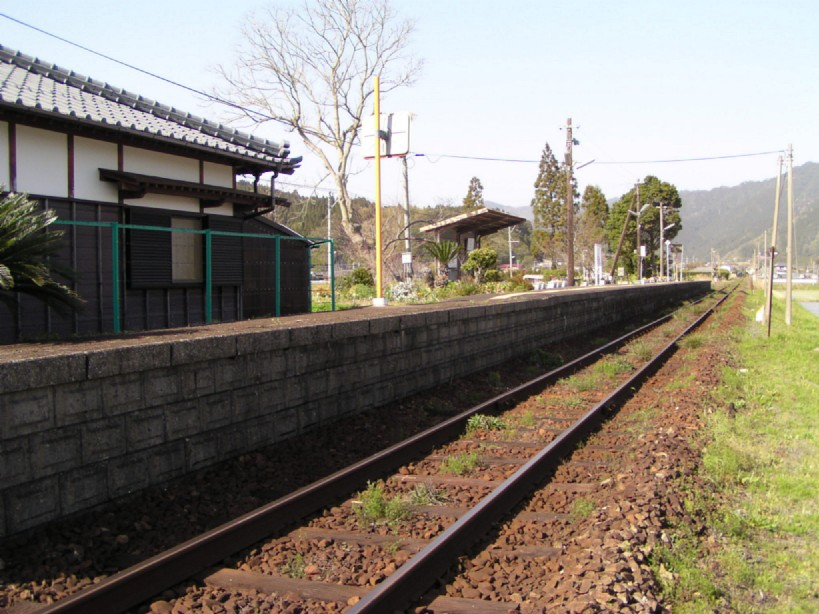
- Uchinoda Station in 2005

General information
- Location: Kitagocho Ofuji, Nichinan-shi, Miyazaki-ken 889-2401; Japan
- Coordinates: 31°38′33″N 131°22′21″E
- Operator: JR Kyushu
- Line: ■ Nichinan Line
- Distance: 37.1 km from Minami-Miyazaki
- Platforms: 1 side platform
- Tracks: 1

Construction
- Structure type: At grade
- Cycle facilities: Bike shed
- Accessible: No - steps to platform

Other information
- Status: Unstaffed
- Website: Official website

History
- Opened: 28 October 1941

Passengers
- FY2016: 10 daily

Services
Preceding station	JR Kyushu	Following station
Kitagō towards Minami-Miyazaki	Nichinan Line	Obi towards Shibushi
Location
- Location within Miyazaki Prefecture Location within Japan

Uchinoda Station (内之田駅, Uchinoda-eki) is a passenger railway station located in the city of Nichinan, Miyazaki Prefecture, Japan. It is operated by JR Kyushu and is on the Nichinan Line.

== Lines ==
The station is served by the Nichinan Line and is located 37.1 km from the starting point of the line at Minami-Miyazaki.

== Layout ==
The station consists of a side platform serving a single track at grade. There is no station building, only a shelter on the platform for waiting passengers. A bike shed has been set up at the station forecourt, from where a short flight of steps leads up to the platform.

== History ==
Japanese Government Railways (JGR) had opened the Shibushi Line from Nishi-Miyakonojō to Sueyoshi (now closed) in 1923. By 1925, the line had been extended eastwards to the east coast of Kyushu at Shibushi. The line was then extended northwards in phases, reaching Aburatsu by 1937. The track was extended further north with Kitagō opening as the northern terminus on 28 October 1941. Uchinoda was one of several intermediate stations opened on the same day on the new track. The route was designated the Nichinan Line on 8 May 1963. With the privatization of JNR on 1 April 1987, the station came under the control of JR Kyushu.

== Passenger statistics ==
In fiscal 2016, the station was used by an average of 10 passengers (boarding only) per day.

== Surrounding area ==
- Nakanoo kuyō-hi National Historic Monument

== See also ==
- List of railway stations in Japan
