= Fukushima-Takamatsu Station =

Railway station in Miyazaki Prefecture, Japan

Fukushima-Takamatsu Station 福島高松駅
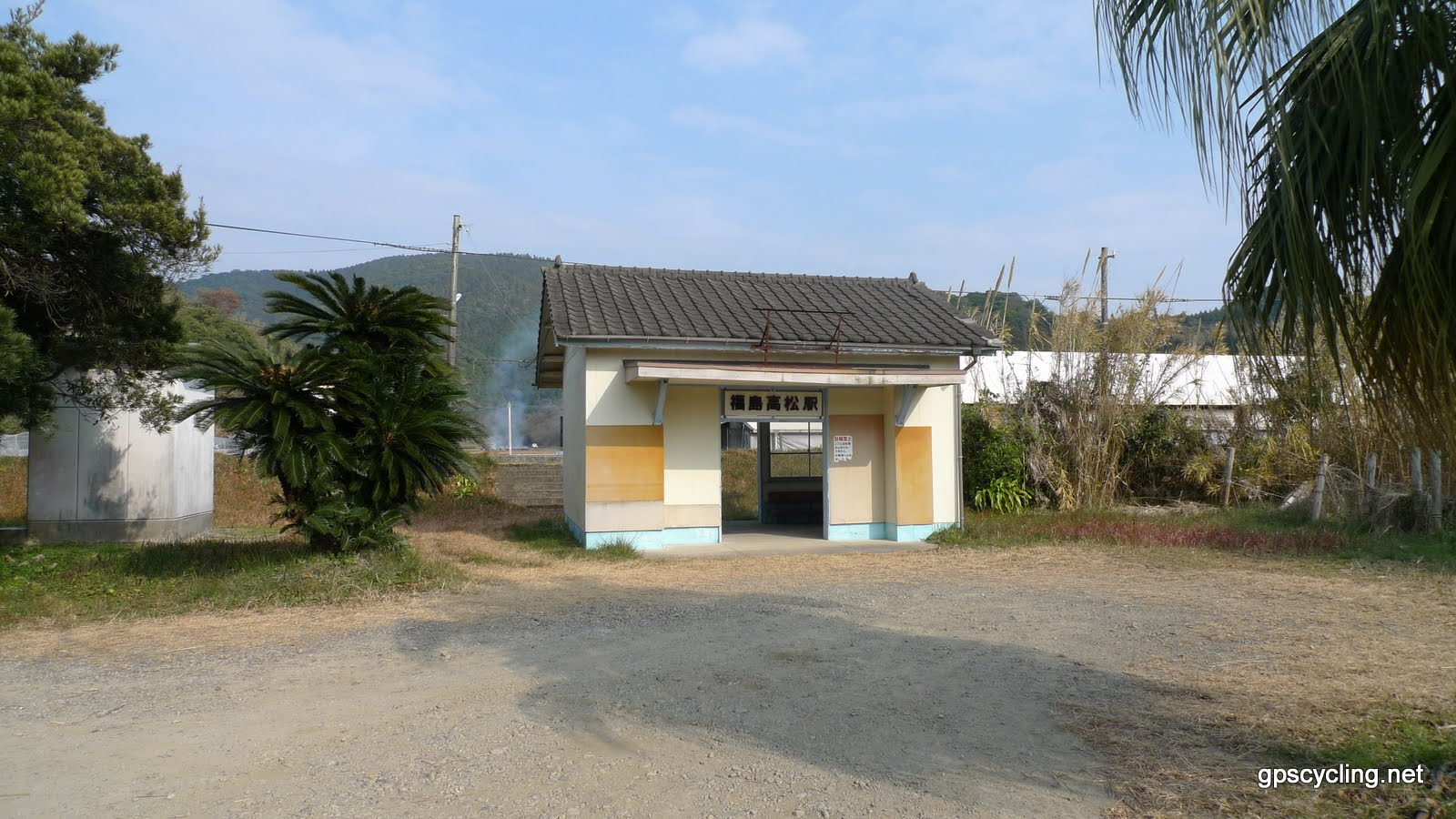
- Fukushima-Takamatsu Station in 2010

General information
- Location: Naru, Kushima-shi, Miyazaki-ken 889-3531; Japan
- Coordinates: 31°27′31″N 131°10′42″E
- Operator: JR Kyushu
- Line: ■ Nichinan Line
- Distance: 79.6 km from Minami-Miyazaki
- Platforms: 1 side platform
- Tracks: 1

Construction
- Structure type: At grade
- Accessible: No

Other information
- Status: Unstaffed
- Website: Official website

History
- Opened: 15 September 1949

Passengers
- FY2016: 2 daily

Services
Preceding station	JR Kyushu	Following station
Fukushima-Imamachi towards Minami-Miyazaki	Nichinan Line	Ōsumi-Natsui towards Shibushi
Location
- Location within Miyazaki Prefecture Location within Japan

Fukushima-Takamatsu Station (福島高松駅, Fukushima-Takamatsu-eki) is a passenger railway station located in the city of Kushima, Miyazaki Prefecture, Japan. It is operated by JR Kyushu.

== Lines ==
The station is served by the Nichinan Line and is located 79.6 km from the starting point of the line at Minami-Miyazaki.

== Layout ==
The station consists of a side platform serving a single track at grade. The station building is a simple wooden structure with a tiled roof. It is unstaffed and serves only as a waiting room. After the ticket gate, short flight of steps leads up to the platform.

== History ==
Japanese National Railways (JNR) opened Fukushima-Takamatsu on 15 September 1949 as a temporary stop on the existing track of its then Shibushi Line. On 10 January 1950, it was upgraded to a full station. On 8 May 1963, the route was designated the Nichinan Line. With the privatization of JNR on 1 April 1987, the station came under the control of JR Kyushu.

== Passenger statistics ==
In fiscal 2016, the station was used by an average of 2 passengers (boarding only) per day.

== Surrounding area ==
- Japan National Route 220
- Takamatsu fishing port

== See also ==
- List of railway stations in Japan
