= Ōsumi-Natsui Station =

Railway station in Shibushi, Kagoshima Prefecture, Japan

Ōsumi-Natsui Station 大隅夏井駅
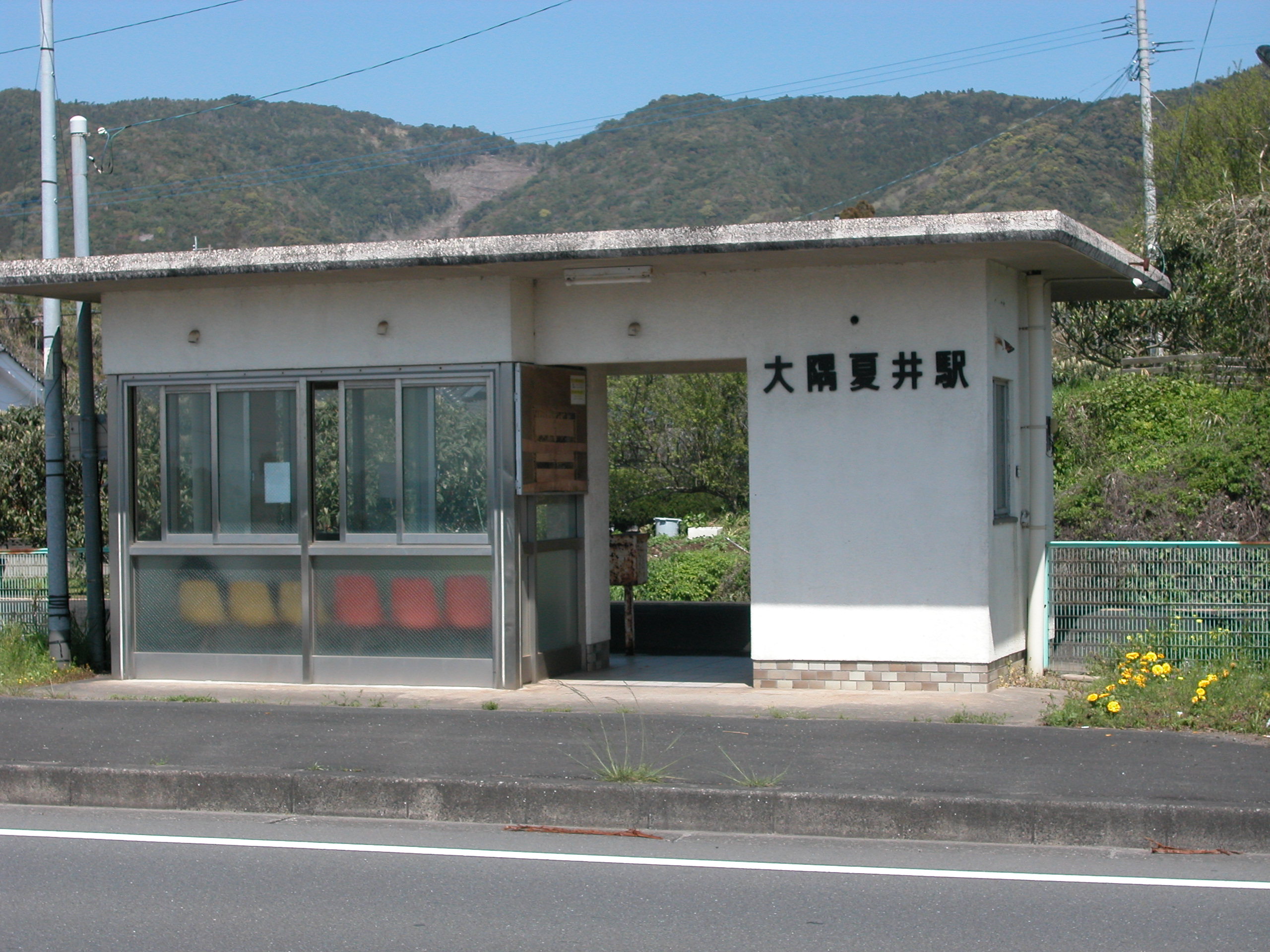
- Station building

General information
- Location: Shibushi-cho Natsui, Shibushi-shi, Kagoshima-ken 899-7101; Japan
- Coordinates: 31°28′11.27″N 131°8′10.45″E
- Operator: JR Kyushu
- Line: ■ Nichinan Line
- Distance: 84.5 km from Minami-Miyazaki
- Platforms: 1 side platform
- Tracks: 1

Construction
- Structure type: At-grade
- Accessible: No

Other information
- Status: Unstaffed
- Website: Official website

History
- Opened: 15 April 1935

Passengers
- FY2015: 1 daily

Services
Preceding station	JR Kyushu	Following station
Fukushima-Takamatsu towards Minami-Miyazaki	Nichinan Line	Shibushi Terminus
Location
- Location within Kagoshima Prefecture Location within Japan

Ōsumi-Natsui Station (大隅夏井駅, Ōsumi-Natsui-eki) is a passenger railway station located in the city of Shibushi, Kagoshima Prefecture, Japan. It is operated by JR Kyushu and is on the Nichinan Line.

== Lines ==
The station is served by the Nichinan Line and is located 84.5 km from the starting point of the line at Minami-Miyazaki.

== Layout ==
The station consists of a single side platform serving one track at grade. It has a small concrete station building that was constructed shortly after the war, and it still exists as a waiting area even after the station became unstaffed.

=== Platforms ===
1	■ Nichinan Line	for Shibushi or Miyazaki

== Gallery ==
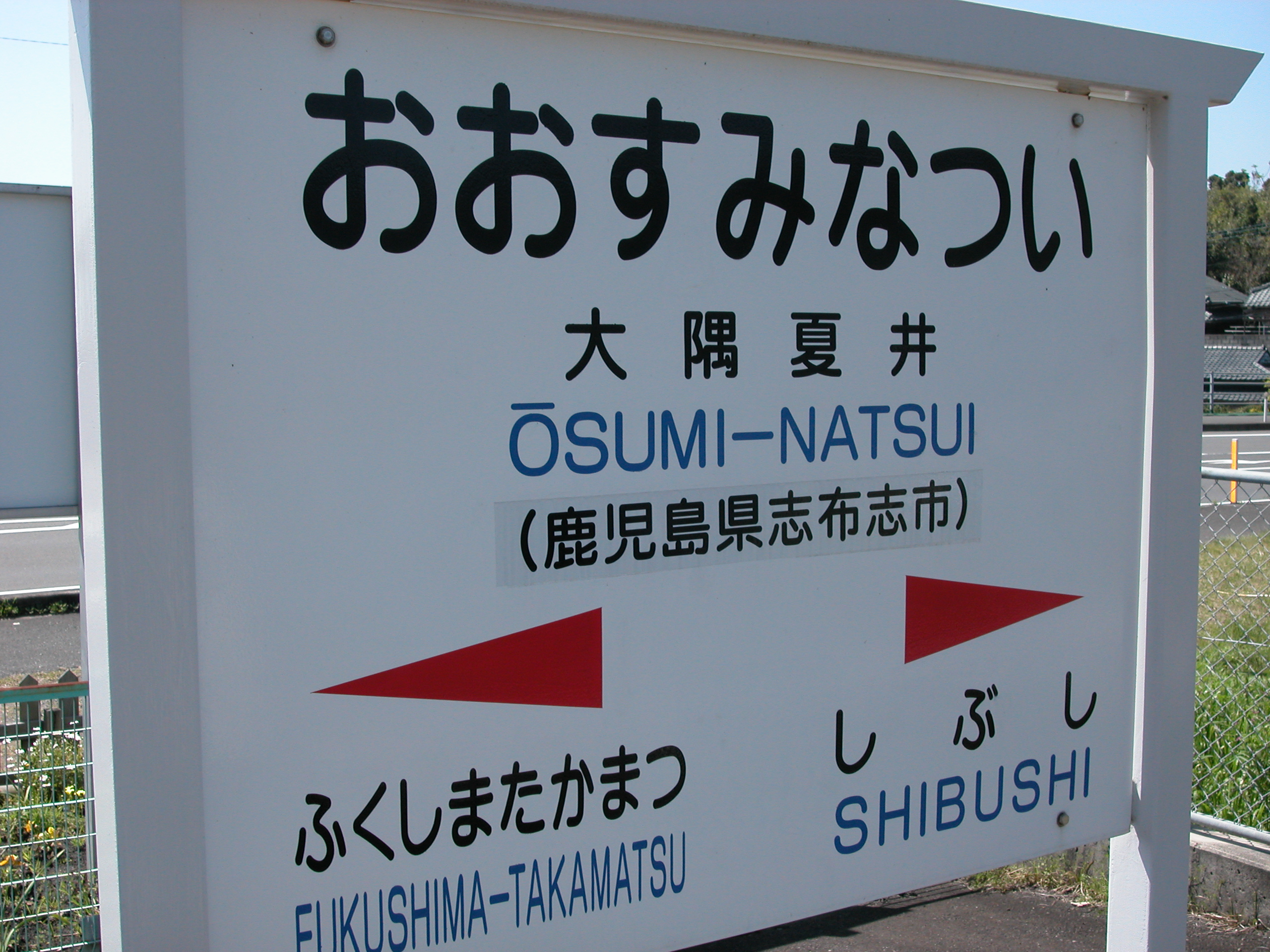
Station sign

== History ==
Japanese Government Railways (JGR) had opened Ōsumi-Natsui Station on 15 April 1935. The route was designated the Nichinan Line on 8 May 1963. Freight operations were discontinued in 1959 and baggage handling in 1962. With the privatization of JNR on 1 April 1987, the station came under the control of JR Kyushu.

== Passenger statistics ==
In fiscal 2015, the station was used by an average of 1 passenger per day.

== Surrounding area ==
- Nichinan Kaigan Quasi-National Park Daguri Cape

== See also ==
- List of railway stations in Japan
