= Oryūzako Station =

Railway station in Miyazaki, Miyazaki Prefecture, Japan

Oryūzako Station 折生迫駅
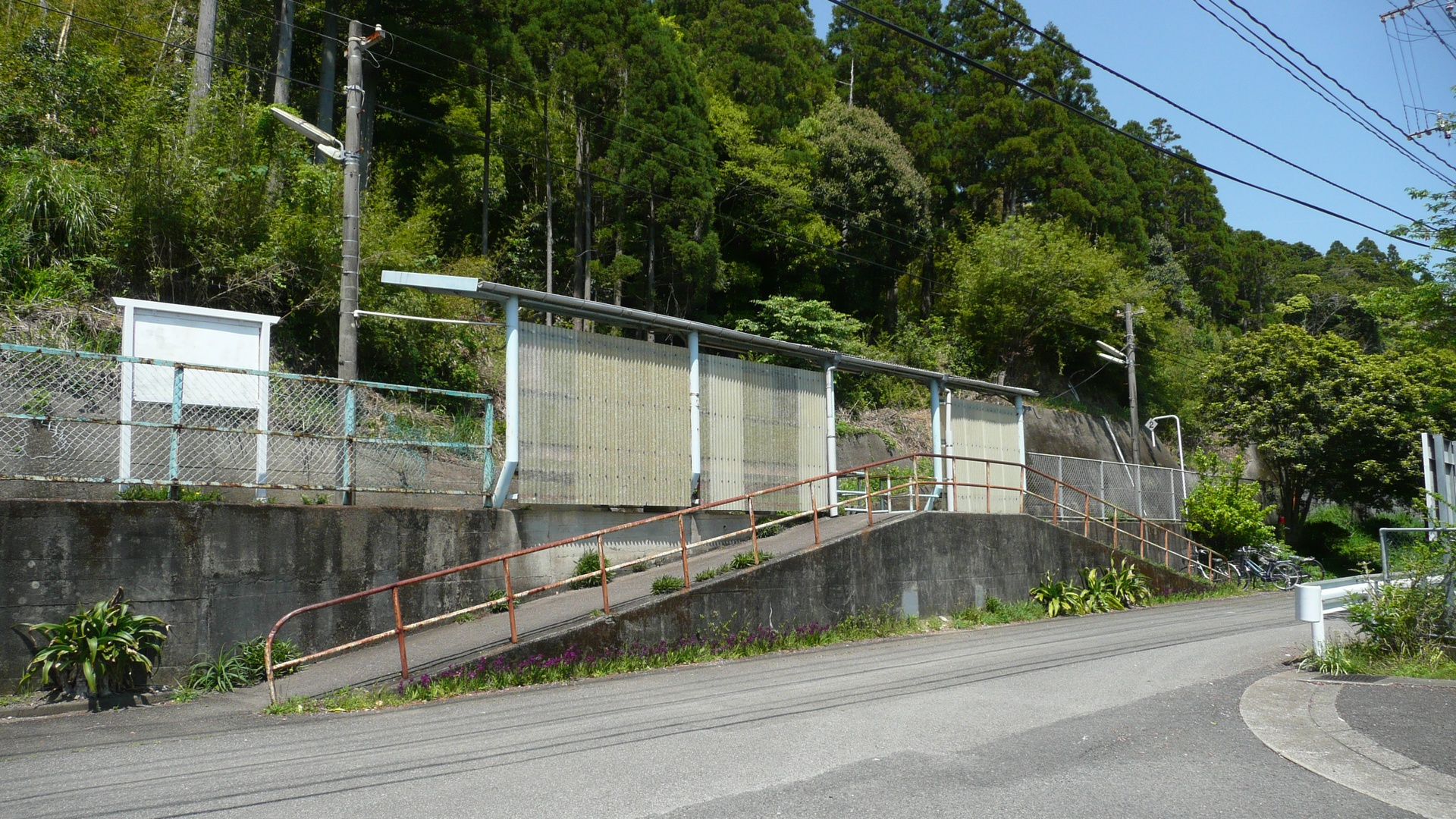
- Oryūzako Station in 2008

General information
- Location: Oriuzako, Miyazaki-shi, Miyazaki-ken889-2164; Japan
- Coordinates: 31°47′21″N 131°28′03″E
- Operator: JR Kyushu
- Line: ■ Nichinan Line
- Distance: 13.8 km from Minami-Miyazaki
- Platforms: 1 side platform
- Tracks: 1

Construction
- Structure type: Sidehill cutting
- Accessible: Yes - ramp to platform

Other information
- Status: Unstaffed
- Website: Official website

History
- Opened: 1 December 1966

Passengers
- FY2016: 23 daily

Services
Preceding station	JR Kyushu	Following station
Aoshima towards Minami-Miyazaki	Nichinan Line	Uchiumi towards Shibushi
Location
- Location within Miyazaki Prefecture Location within Japan

Oryūzako Station (折生迫駅, Oryūzako-eki) is a passenger railway station located in the city of Miyazaki City, Miyazaki Prefecture, Japan. It is operated by JR Kyushu and is on the Nichinan Line.

== Lines ==
The station is served by the Nichinan Line and is located 13.8 km from the starting point of the line at Minami-Miyazaki.Only local trains stop at this station.

== Layout ==
The station, which is unstaffed, consists of a side platform serving a single track on a sidehill cutting. There is no station building, only a shelter on the platform for waiting passengers. A ramp leads up to the platform from the access road.

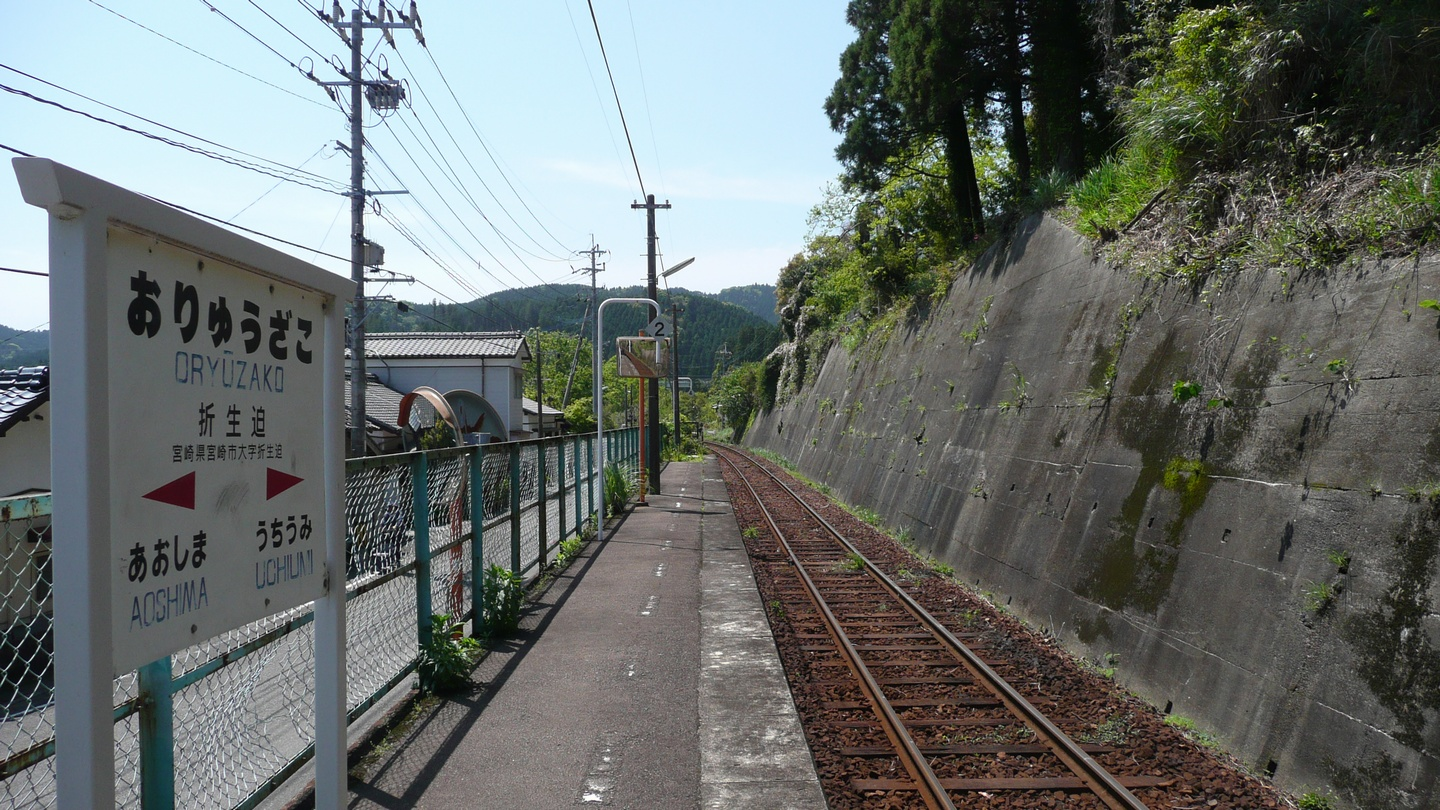
A view of the station platform and track.

== History ==
Japanese National Railways (JNR) opened the station on 1 December 1966 as an additional station on the existing track of the Nichinan Line. With the privatization of JNR on 1 April 1987, the station came under the control of JR Kyushu.

== Passenger statistics ==
In fiscal 2016, the station was used by an average of 23 passengers (boarding only) per day.

== Surrounding area ==
- Miyazaki City Aoshima Elementary School
- Miyazaki City Aoshima Junior High School

== See also ==
- List of railway stations in Japan
