= Fukushima-Imamachi Station =

Railway station in Kushima, Miyazaki Prefecture, Japan

Fukushima-Imamachi Station 福島今町駅
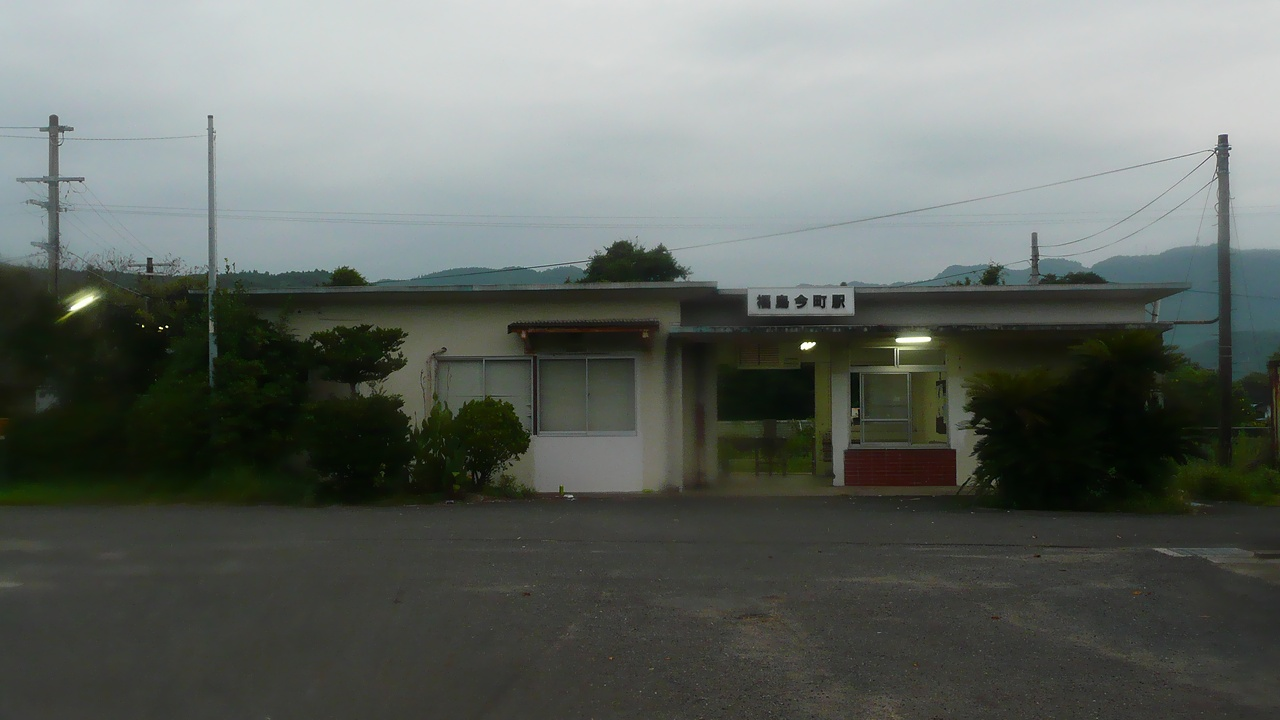
- Fukushima-Imamachi Station in 2009

General information
- Location: Nishikata, Kushima-shi, Miyazaki-ken 888-0001; Japan
- Coordinates: 31°27′24″N 131°12′12″E
- Operator: JR Kyushu
- Line: ■ Nichinan Line
- Distance: 77.2 km from Minami-Miyazaki
- Platforms: 2 side platforms
- Tracks: 2 + 1 siding

Construction
- Structure type: At grade
- Accessible: No

Other information
- Status: Unstaffed
- Website: Official website

History
- Opened: 15 April 1935

Passengers
- FY2016: 5 daily

Services
Preceding station	JR Kyushu	Following station
Kushima towards Minami-Miyazaki	Nichinan Line	Fukushima-Takamatsu towards Shibushi
Location
- Location within Miyazaki Prefecture Location within Japan

Fukushima-Imamachi Station (福島今町駅, Fukushima-Imamachi-eki) is a passenger railway station located in the city of Kushima, Miyazaki Prefecture, Japan. It is operated by JR Kyushu.

== Lines ==
The station is served by the Nichinan Line and is located 77.2 km from the starting point of the line at Minami-Miyazaki.

== Layout ==
The station consists of two side platforms serving two tracks at grade. The station building is a simple concrete block structure which is unstaffed and serves only as a waiting room. Access to the opposite side platform is by means of a level crossing.

=== Platforms ===
South (station side)	■ ■ Nichinan Line	for Shibushi
North	■ ■ Nichinan Line	for Aburatsu and Minami-Miyazaki

== History ==
Japanese Government Railways (JGR) had opened the Shibushi Line from Nishi-Miyakonojō to Sueyoshi (now closed) in 1923. By 1925, the line had been extended eastwards to the east coast of Kyushu at Shibushi. The line was then extended northwards in phases. The first major phase of expansion added 28.5 km of track and several stations, reaching Yowara, which opened as the new northern terminus on 15 April 1935. Fukushima-Imamachi was one of the intermediate stations which opened on the same day. On 8 May 1963, the route was designated the Nichinan Line. With the privatization of Japanese National Railways (JNR), the successor of JGR, on 1 April 1987, the station came under the control of JR Kyushu.

== Passenger statistics ==
In fiscal 2016, the station was used by an average of 5 passengers (boarding only) per day.

== Surrounding area ==
- Kushima City Ariake Elementary School

== See also ==
- List of railway stations in Japan
