= Kouchiumi Station =

Railway station in Miyazaki, Miyazaki Prefecture, Japan

Kouchiumi Station 小内海駅
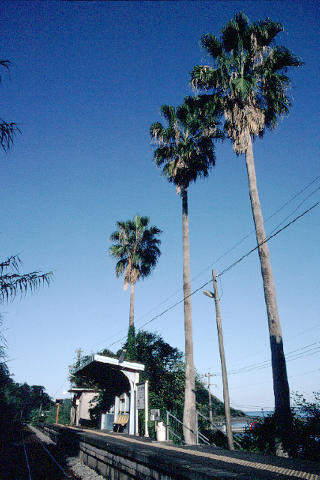
- Kouchiumi Station in 2009

General information
- Location: Uchiumi, Miyazaki-shi, Miyazaki-ken, 889-2301; Japan
- Coordinates: 31°44′16″N 131°27′58″E
- Operator: JR Kyushu
- Line: ■ Nichinan Line
- Distance: 19.9 km from Minami-Miyazaki
- Platforms: 1 side platform
- Tracks: 1

Construction
- Structure type: Sidehill cutting
- Cycle facilities: Designated parking area for bicycles
- Accessible: No - steps lead up to platform

Other information
- Status: Unstaffed
- Website: Official website

History
- Opened: 8 May 1963

Passengers
- FY2016: 6 daily

Services
Preceding station	JR Kyushu	Following station
Uchiumi towards Minami-Miyazaki	Nichinan Line	Ibii towards Shibushi
Location
- Location within Miyazaki Prefecture Location within Japan

Kouchiumi Station (小内海駅, Kouchiumi-eki) is a passenger railway station located in the city of Miyazaki City, Miyazaki Prefecture, Japan. It is operated by JR Kyushu and is on the Nichinan Line.

== Lines ==
The station is served by the Nichinan Line and is located 19.9 km from the starting point of the line at Minami-Miyazaki. Only local trains stop at this station.

== Layout ==
The station, which is not staffed, consists of a side platform serving a single track on a sidehill cutting grade. There is no station building, only a shelter on the platform for waiting passengers. From the access road, a flight of steps leads up to the platform. There is no station forecourt and no parking available for cars. A designated parking area for bicycles is provided near the steps.

== History ==
The private Miyazaki Light Railway (宮崎軽便鉄道) (later renamed the Miyazaki Railway) opened a line on 31 October 1913 between Minami-Miyazaki and Uchiumi (a station of the same name but at a different location from this present one). The line and its stations closed when the Miyazaki Railway ceased operations on 1 July 1962. Subsequently, Japanese National Railways (JNR) extended its then Shibushi Line north from Kitagō towards Minami-Miyazaki using largely the same route. The linkup, which included the reopening of several previously closed stations, was completed on 8 May 1963, whereupon the route was renamed the Nichinan Line. Kouchiumi was one of several new intermediate stations which were opened on the same day. The platform was lengthened by 20 meters in 1978, giving it an effective length of 90 meters. With the privatization of JNR on 1 April 1987, the station came under the control of JR Kyushu.

== Passenger statistics ==
In fiscal 2016, the station was used by an average of 6 passengers (boarding only) per day.

== Surrounding area ==
- Kinchaku Island

== See also ==
- List of railway stations in Japan
