= Hyūga-Kitakata Station =

Railway station in Kushima, Miyazaki Prefecture, Japan

Hyūga-Kitakata Station 日向北方駅
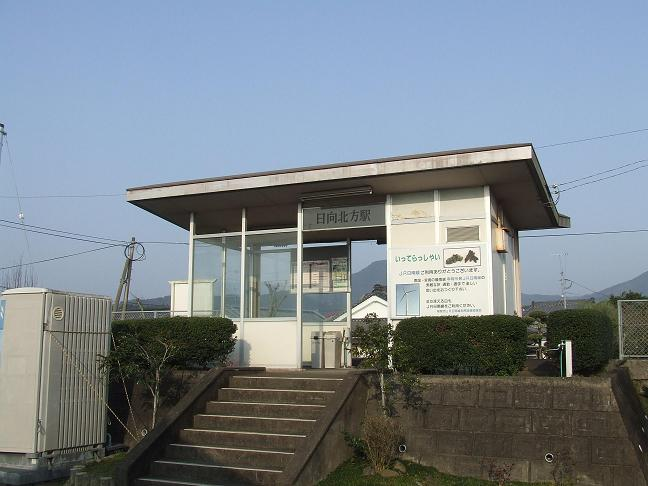
- Hyūga-Kitakata Station in 2010

General information
- Location: Kushima-shi, Miyazaki-ken 888-0004; Japan
- Coordinates: 31°28′59″N 131°14′36″E
- Operator: JR Kyushu
- Line: ■ Nichinan Line
- Distance: 71.8 km from Minami-Miyazaki
- Platforms: 1 side platform
- Tracks: 1

Construction
- Structure type: At grade
- Cycle facilities: Bike shed
- Accessible: No - steps to platform

Other information
- Status: Unstaffed
- Website: Official website

History
- Opened: 15 April 1935

Passengers
- FY2016: 12 daily

Services
Preceding station	JR Kyushu	Following station
Hyūga-Ōtsuka towards Minami-Miyazaki	Nichinan Line	Kushima towards Shibushi
Location
- Location within Miyazaki Prefecture Location within Japan

Hyūga-Kitakata Station (日向北方駅, Hyūga-Kitakata-eki) is a passenger railway station located in the city of Kushima, Miyazaki Prefecture, Japan. It is operated by JR Kyushu.

== Lines ==
The station is served by the Nichinan Line and is located 71.8 km from the starting point of the line at Minami-Miyazaki.

== Layout ==
The station consists of a side platform serving a single track at grade in a residential area. There is no station building, only a simple modern shed which serves as a waiting room. A bike shed has been set up at the station forecourt. From there, a short flight of steps leads up to the waiting room and platform.

== History ==
Japanese Government Railways (JGR) had opened the Shibushi Line from Nishi-Miyakonojō to Sueyoshi (now closed) in 1923. By 1925, the line had been extended eastwards to the east coast of Kyushu at Shibushi. The line was then extended northwards in phases. The first major phase of expansion added 28.5 km of track and several stations, reaching Yowara, which opened as the new northern terminus on 15 April 1935. Hyūga-Kitakata was one of the intermediate stations which opened on the same day. On 8 May 1963, the route was designated the Nichinan Line. With the privatization of Japanese National Railways (JNR), the successor of JGR, on 1 April 1987, the station came under the control of JR Kyushu.

== Passenger statistics ==
In fiscal 2016, the station was used by an average of 12 passengers (boarding only) per day.

== Surrounding area ==
- Japan National Route 220

== See also ==
- List of railway stations in Japan
