= Taninokuchi Station =

Railway station in Nichinan, Miyazaki Prefecture, Japan

Taninokuchi Station 谷之口駅
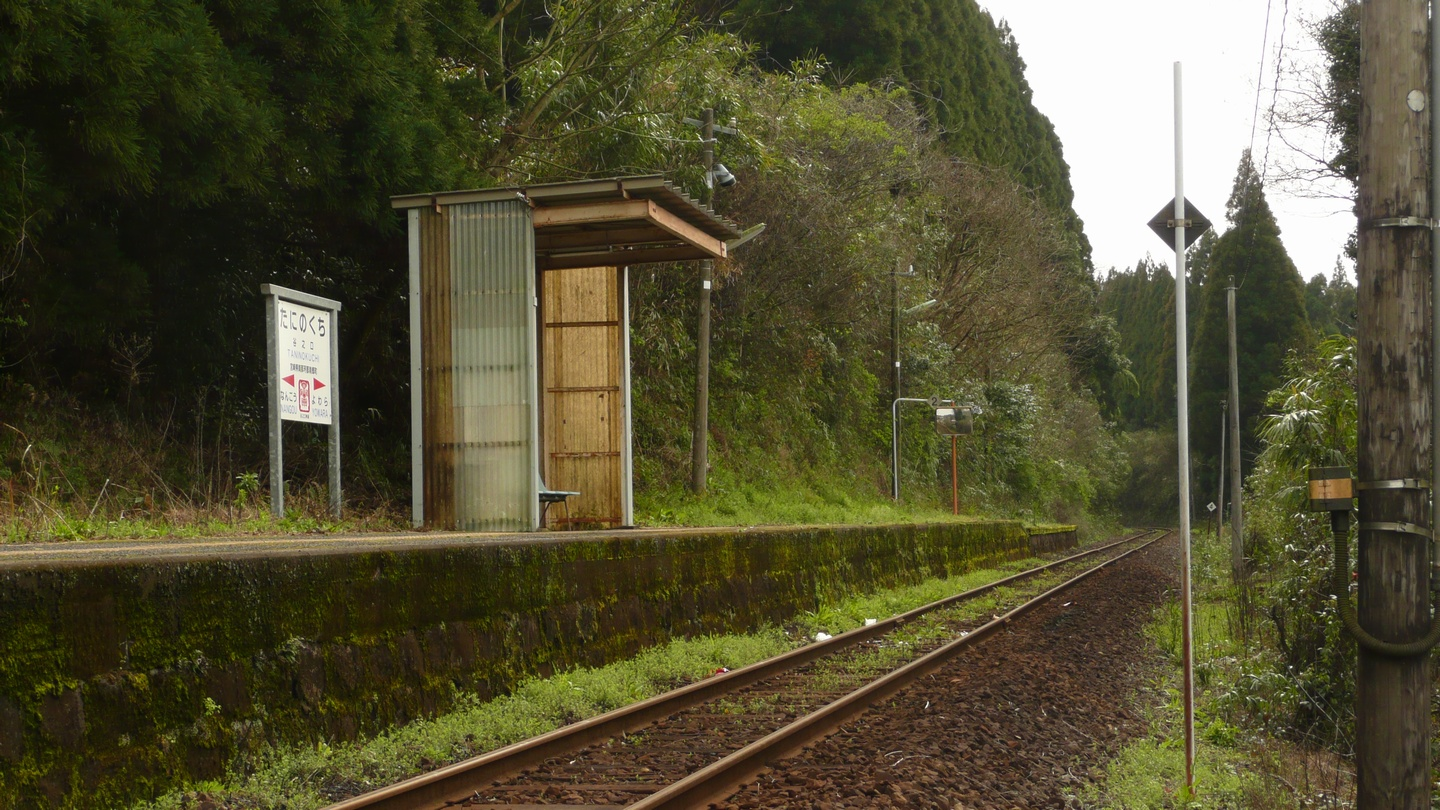
- Taninokuchi Station in 2009

General information
- Location: Nangocho Taninokuchi, Nichinan-shi, Miyazaki-ken 889-3203; Japan
- Coordinates: 31°32′01″N 131°20′41″E
- Operator: JR Kyushu
- Line: ■ Nichinan Line
- Distance: 56.1 km from Minami-Miyazaki
- Platforms: 1 side platform
- Tracks: 1

Construction
- Structure type: At grade
- Cycle facilities: Bike shed
- Accessible: No

Other information
- Status: Unstaffed
- Website: Official website

History
- Opened: 15 January 1949

Passengers
- FY2016: 4 daily

Services
| Preceding station | JR Kyushu | Following station |
|---|---|---|
| Nangō towards Minami-Miyazaki | Nichinan Line | Yowara towards Shibushi |
Location
- Location within Miyazaki Prefecture Location within Japan

Taninokuchi Station (谷之口駅, Taninokuchi-eki) is a passenger railway station located in the city of Nichinan, Miyazaki Prefecture, Japan. It is operated by JR Kyushu and is on the Nichinan Line.

== Lines ==
The station is served by the Nichinan Line and is located 56.1 km from the starting point of the line at Minami-Miyazaki.

== Layout ==
The station consists of a side platform serving a single track at grade. There is no station building, only a simple weather shelter on the platform. The platform is located on the other side of the track from the access road. From the station entrance, a level crossing is used to cross the track to the platform. A bike shed has been set up at the station entrance.

== History ==
Japanese National Railways (JNR) opened the station on 15 January 1949 as an additional station on the existing track of its then Shibushi Line. On 8 May 1963, the route was redesignated the Nichinan Line. With the privatization of JNR on 1 April 1987, the station came under the control of JR Kyushu.

== Passenger statistics ==
In fiscal 2016, the station was used by an average of 4 passengers (boarding only) per day.

== Surrounding area ==
- Japan National Route 220

== See also ==
- List of railway stations in Japan
