= Uchiumi Station =

Railway station in Miyazaki, Miyazaki Prefecture, Japan

Uchiumi Station 内海駅
- Uchiumi Station in 2026

General information
- Location: Uchiumi, Miyazaki-shi, Miyazaki-ken 889-2301; Japan
- Coordinates: 31°45′31″N 131°28′03″E
- Operator: JR Kyushu
- Line: ■ Nichinan Line
- Distance: 17.5 km from Minami-Miyazaki
- Platforms: 1 side platform
- Tracks: 1 + 1 siding

Construction
- Structure type: At grade

Other information
- Status: Unstaffed
- Website: Official website

History
- Opened: 8 May 1963

Passengers
- FY2016: 19 daily

Services
Preceding station	JR Kyushu	Following station
Oryūzako towards Minami-Miyazaki	Nichinan Line	Kouchiumi towards Shibushi
Location
- Location within Miyazaki Prefecture Location within Japan

Uchiumi Station (内海駅, Uchiumi-eki) is a passenger railway station located in the city of Miyazaki City, Miyazaki Prefecture, Japan. It is operated by JR Kyushu and is on the Nichinan Line. The station is distinct and at a different location from another station nearby of the same name which was opened in 1913 and closed in 1962.

== Lines ==
The station is served by the Nichinan Line and is located 17.5 km from the starting point of the line at Minami-Miyazaki.

== Layout ==
The station, which is unstaffed, consists of a side platform serving a single track at grade. There is no station building but a shed built near the station entrance serves as a waiting room. An automatic ticket vending machine has not been installed.

== History ==
The private Miyazaki Light Railway (宮崎軽便鉄道) (later renamed the Miyazaki Railway) opened a line on 31 October 1913 between Minami-Miyazaki and Uchiumi (a station of the same name but at a different location from this present one). The line and its stations closed when the Miyazaki Railway ceased operations on 1 July 1962. Subsequently, Japanese National Railways (JNR) extended its then Shibushi Line north from Kitagō towards Minami-Miyazaki using largely the same route. The linkup, which included the reopening of some previously closed Miyazaki Railway stations, was completed on 8 May 1963, whereupon the route was renamed the Nichinan Line. Uchiumi was also opened on the same day. It used the name of a previously closed station nearby, but was a new station at a different location. Freight services were discontinued in 1964 and baggage handling in 1967. In 1978 the platform was extended by 20 meters, giving it an effective length of 90 meters. With the privatization of JNR on 1 April 1987, the station came under the control of JR Kyushu.

== Passenger statistics ==
In fiscal 2016, the station was used by an average of 19 passengers (boarding only) per day.

== Surrounding area ==
- Miyazaki City Uchiumi Elementary School

== See also ==
- List of railway stations in Japan
