= Nichinan Line =

Railway line in Kyushu, Japan

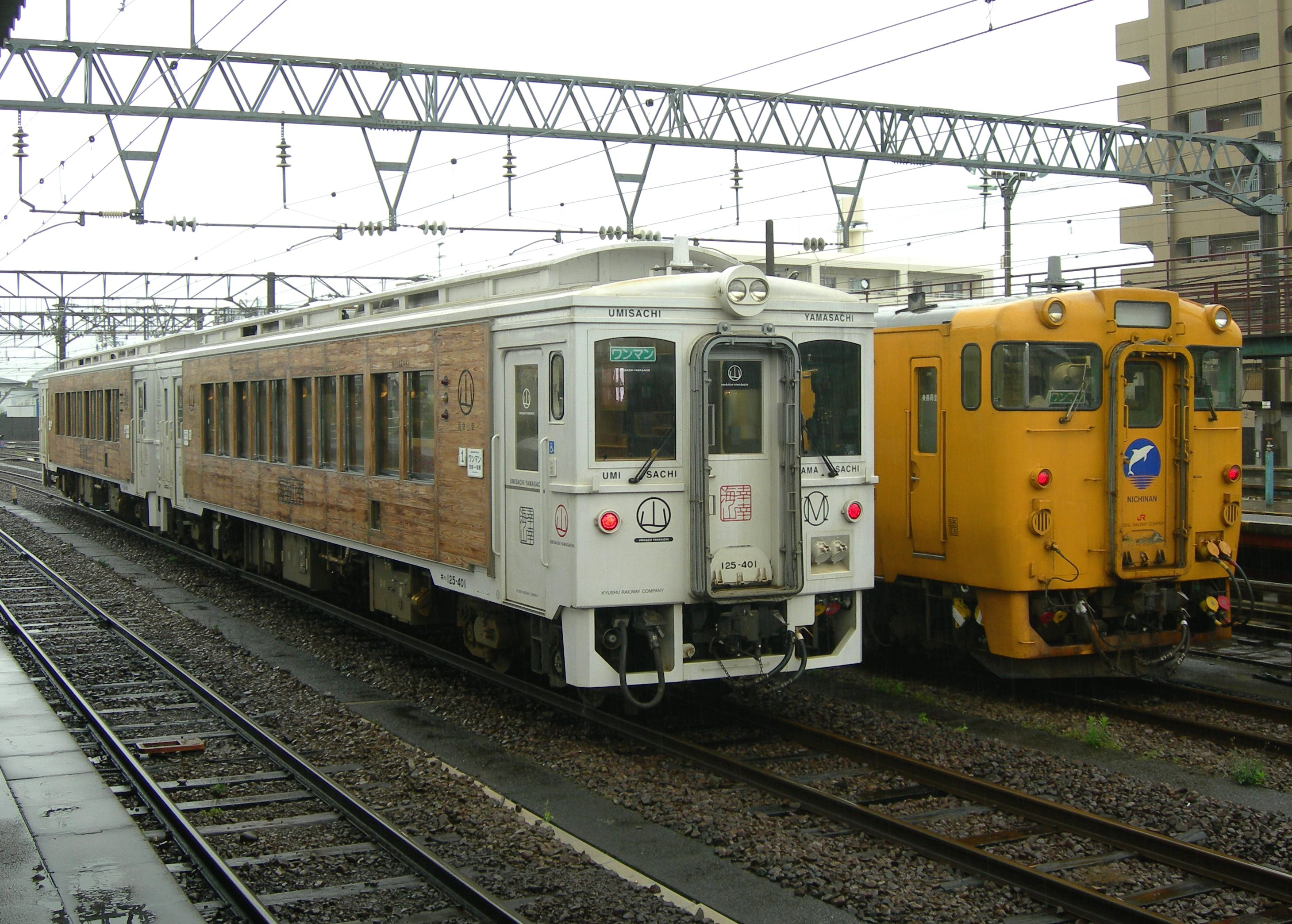
- Nichinan Line trainsets, with the Umisachi Yamasachi limited express on the left

Overview
- Owner: JR Kyushu
- Locale: Kyushu
- Termini: Minami-Miyazaki; Shibushi
- Stations: 28

Service
- Type: Heavy rail
- Rolling stock: KiHa 40 series

Technical
- Line length: 88.9 km (55.2 mi)
- Num of tracks: Single
- Track gauge: 1,067 mm (3 ft 6 in)
- Electrification: 20 kV AC, overhead catenary (Minami Miyazaki - Tayoshi)

The Nichinan Line (日南線, Nichinan-sen) is a railway line in south-eastern Kyushu, Japan, operated by Kyushu Railway Company (JR Kyushu). It connects Minami-Miyazaki Station in Miyazaki, Miyazaki to Shibushi Station in Shibushi, Kagoshima.

== History ==
The Miyazaki Prefectural Government opened the first section of the line from Obi - Aburatsu in 1913, the same year that the Miyazaki Light Railway was opened from the port of Miyazaki to Uchiumi. The lines were linked in 1932, and nationalised in 1935. The extension to Kitago opened in 1941, and to Shibushi (as a passenger only section) in 1963.

Steam locomotives were withdrawn from the line in 1973. Freight services to Kitago ceased in 1982, and in 1990 the Shibushi station was relocated 100m closer to Miyazaki. The Minami Miyazaki - Tayoshi section was electrified in 1996 in conjunction with the opening of the Miyazaki Airport line. Subsequently, the line has been electrified as far as Kodomonokuni.

=== Former connecting lines ===
Shibushi Station:

- The 39 km line to Nishi-Miyakonojō (known as the Shibushi Line) opened between 1923 and 1925, connecting to the Nippo Main Line. Freight service ended in 1983 and the line closed in 1987.
- The 98 km line to Kokubu (known as the Osumi Line), also connecting to the Nippo Main Line, was not completed until 1972. The first section was opened by the Osumi Light Railway Co. as a 762mm gauge line from Funama to Kushira, via a reversing station at Kanoya, between 1915 and 1923. The line was nationalised in 1935, the same year the Shibushi - Higashikushira section was opened by JR. The 1 km connection to Kushira opened the following year, and in 1938 the Kushira - Funama section was regauged, with a new station at Kanoya removing the need to reverse direction there. The Funama - Kaigata section opened in 1961 as a passenger only line, and the Kaigata - Kokubu section also opened without freight service. The rest of the line lost freight service in 1982, and the entire line closed in 1987.

== Stations ==
•: Stops
|: Non-stop

Stations		Distance (km)	Nichinan Marine rapid	Transfers	Location	
Nippō Main Line
Miyazaki	宮崎	-2.6	•	Nippō Main Line (For Ōita and Kokura)	Miyazaki	Miyazaki Prefecture
Nichinan Line
Minami-Miyazaki	南宮崎	0.0	•	Nippō Main Line (For Kagoshima)	Miyazaki	Miyazaki Prefecture
Tayoshi	田吉	2.0	•	Miyazaki Kūkō Line	Miyazaki	Miyazaki Prefecture
Minamikata	南方	4.2	|		Miyazaki	Miyazaki Prefecture
Kibana	木花	7.5	•		Miyazaki	Miyazaki Prefecture
Undōkōen	運動公園	9.0	•		Miyazaki	Miyazaki Prefecture
Sosanji	曽山寺	10.2	|		Miyazaki	Miyazaki Prefecture
Kodomonokuni	子供の国	11.4	•		Miyazaki	Miyazaki Prefecture
Aoshima	青島	12.7	•		Miyazaki	Miyazaki Prefecture
Oryūzako	折生迫	13.8	|		Miyazaki	Miyazaki Prefecture
Uchiumi	内海	17.5	|		Miyazaki	Miyazaki Prefecture
Kouchiumi	小内海	19.9	|		Miyazaki	Miyazaki Prefecture
Ibii	伊比井	23.3	•		Nichinan	Miyazaki Prefecture
Kitagō	北郷	32.5	•		Nichinan	Miyazaki Prefecture
Uchinoda	内之田	37.1	|		Nichinan	Miyazaki Prefecture
Obi	飫肥	39.8	•		Nichinan	Miyazaki Prefecture
Nichinan	日南	43.8	•		Nichinan	Miyazaki Prefecture
Aburatsu	油津	46.0	•		Nichinan	Miyazaki Prefecture
Ōdōtsu	大堂津	50.3	•		Nichinan	Miyazaki Prefecture
Nangō	南郷	53.0	•		Nichinan	Miyazaki Prefecture
Taninokuchi	谷之口	56.1	•		Nichinan	Miyazaki Prefecture
Yowara	榎原	60.5	•		Nichinan	Miyazaki Prefecture
Hyūga-Ōtsuka	日向大束	68.6	•		Kushima	Miyazaki Prefecture
Hyūga-Kitakata	日向北方	71.8	•		Kushima	Miyazaki Prefecture
Kushima	串間	74.4	•		Kushima	Miyazaki Prefecture
Fukushima-Imamachi	福島今町	77.2	•		Kushima	Miyazaki Prefecture
Fukushima-Takamatsu	福島高松	79.6	•		Kushima	Miyazaki Prefecture
Ōsumi-Natsui	大隅夏井	84.5	•		Shibushi	Kagoshima Prefecture
Shibushi	志布志	88.9	•		Shibushi	Kagoshima Prefecture
