= Nichinan =

Nichinan may refer to:

- Nichinan, Miyazaki, a city in Japan
  - Nichinan Station
- Nichinan, Tottori, a town in Japan
- JS Nichinan, an oceanographic research ship of the Japan Maritime Self-Defense Force
