= 内海駅 =

内海駅 is the name of multiple train stations in Japan:

- Uchiumi Station
- Utsumi Station
