= Nichinan Station =

Railway station in Nichinan, Miyazaki Prefecture, Japan

Nichinan Station 日南駅
- Nichinan Station in 2025

General information
- Location: 1-chome Chuodori, Nichinan-shi, Miyazaki-ken 887-0021; Japan
- Coordinates: 31°36′10″N 131°22′52″E
- Operator: JR Kyushu
- Line: ■ Nichinan Line
- Distance: 43.8 km from Minami-Miyazaki
- Platforms: 1 side platform
- Tracks: 1

Construction
- Structure type: At grade
- Parking: Available
- Cycle facilities: Bike shed

Other information
- Status: Kan'i itaku station
- Website: Official website

History
- Opened: 28 October 1941
- Former names: Agata (until 1 January 1952)

Passengers
- FY2016: 256 daily

Services
| Preceding station | JR Kyushu | Following station |
|---|---|---|
| Obi towards Minami-Miyazaki | Nichinan Line | Aburatsu towards Shibushi |
Location
- Location within Miyazaki Prefecture Location within Japan

Nichinan Station (日南駅, Nichinan-eki) is a passenger railway station located in the city of Nichinan, Miyazaki Prefecture, Japan. It is operated by JR Kyushu and is on the Nichinan Line.

== Lines ==
The station is served by the Nichinan Line and is located 43.8 km from the starting point of the line at Minami-Miyazaki.

== Layout ==
The station consists of a side platform serving a single track at grade. A disused platform stands to the east of the track. The station building is a modern steel frame structure which houses a staffed ticket window and a waiting area. A bike shed and parking are available at the station forecourt.

JR Kyushu had planned to cease staffing the station. To maintain service to residents, the Nichinan City authorities took over the management of the ticket window as a kan'i itaku agent on 1 April 2015.

== History ==
Japanese Government Railways (JGR) had opened the Shibushi Line from Nishi-Miyakonojō to Sueyoshi (now closed) in 1923. By 1925, the line had been extended eastwards to the east coast of Kyushu at Shibushi. The line was then extended northwards in phases, reaching Aburatsu by 1937. The track was extended further north with Kitagō opening as the northern terminus on 28 October 1941. Nichinan, at that time named Agata Station (吾田駅), was one of several intermediate stations opened on the same day on the new track. The station was renamed Nichinan on 1 January 1952. The route was designated the Nichinan Line on 8 May 1963. Freight operations were discontinued in 1982 and baggage handling in 1985. With the privatization of JNR on 1 April 1987, the station came under the control of JR Kyushu.

== Passenger statistics ==
In fiscal 2016, the station was used by an average of 256 passengers (boarding only) per day.

== Surrounding area ==
- Nichinan City Hall

== See also ==
- List of railway stations in Japan
