= Kushima Station =

Railway station in Kushima, Miyazaki Prefecture, Japan

Kushima Station 串間駅
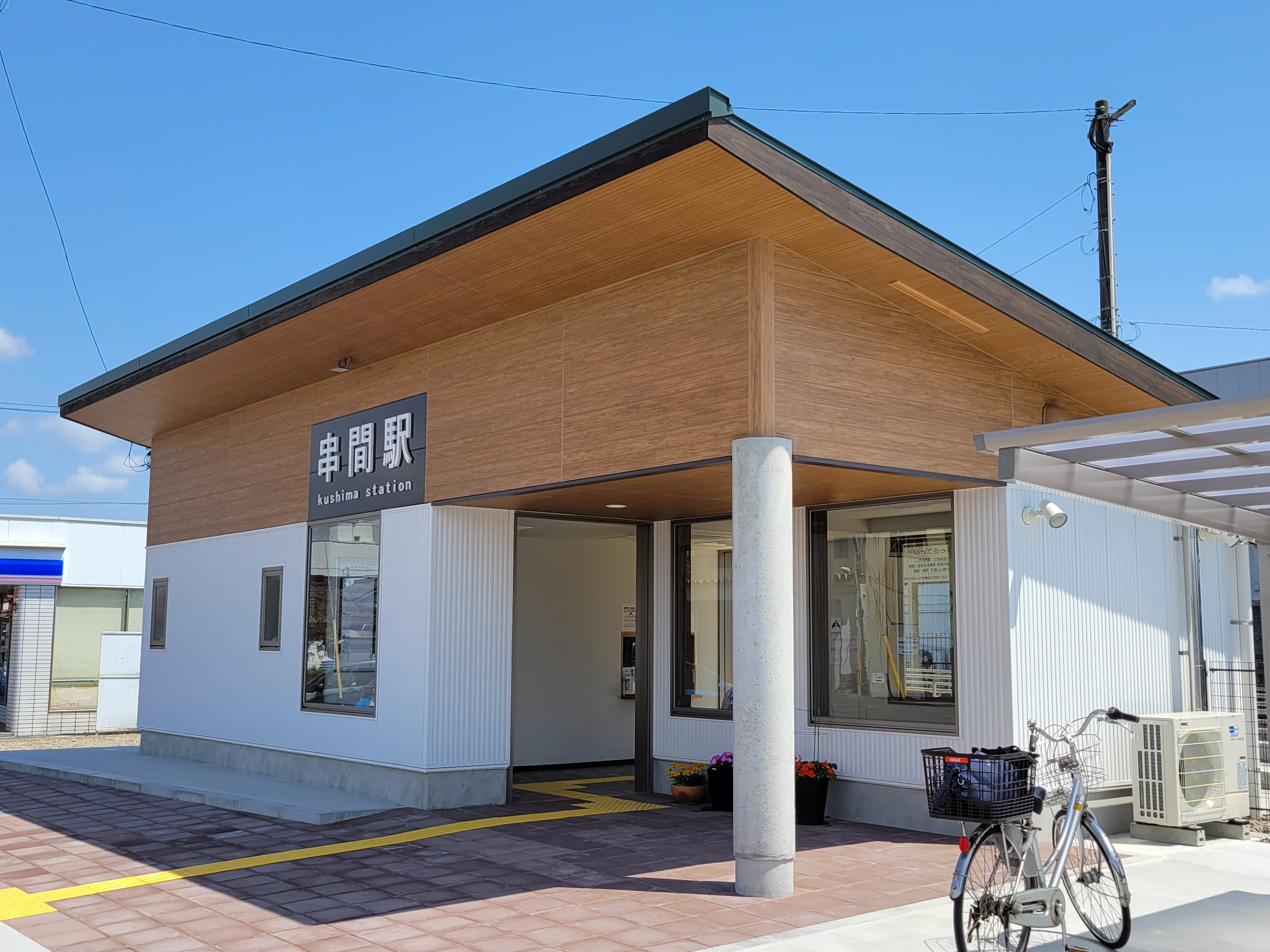
- Kushima Station in 2023

General information
- Location: Nishikata, Kushima-shi, Miyazaki-ken 888-0001; Japan
- Coordinates: 31°27′47″N 131°13′49″E
- Operator: JR Kyushu
- Line: ■ Nichinan Line
- Distance: 74.4 km from Minami-Miyazaki
- Platforms: 1 side platform
- Tracks: 1 + 1 siding

Construction
- Structure type: At grade
- Parking: Available at forecourt
- Cycle facilities: Bike shed

Other information
- Status: Kan'i itaku agent on site
- Website: Official website

History
- Opened: 15 April 1935
- Former names: Fukushima-nakamachi (until 1 October 1959)

Passengers
- FY2016: 86 daily

Services
Preceding station	JR Kyushu	Following station
Hyūga-Kitakata towards Minami-Miyazaki	Nichinan Line	Fukushima-Imamachi towards Shibushi
Location
- Location within Miyazaki Prefecture Location within Japan

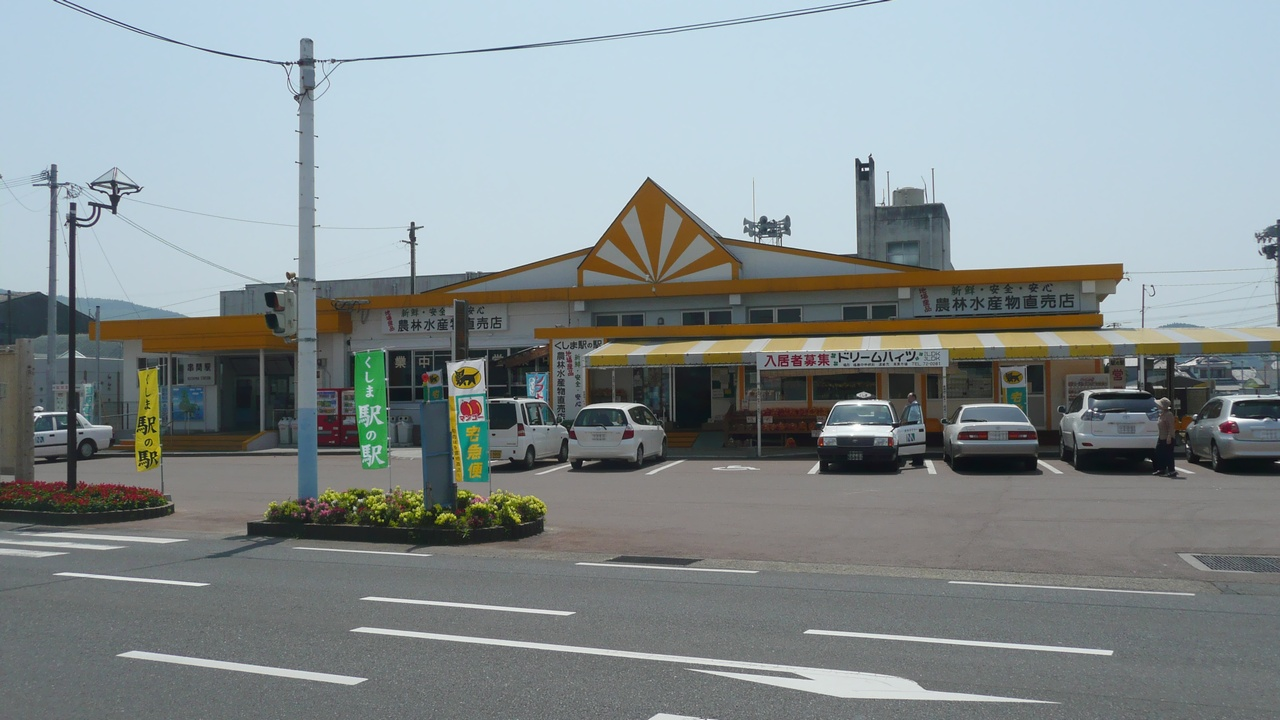
Kushima Station in 2009

Kushima Station (串間駅, Kushima-eki) is a passenger railway station located in the city of Kushima, Miyazaki Prefecture, Japan. It is operated by JR Kyushu.

== Lines ==
The station is served by the Nichinan Line and is located 74.4 km from the starting point of the line at Minami-Miyazaki.

== Layout ==
The station consists of a side platform serving a single track at grade with a siding. The station premises are located to one side of a modern concrete building most of which is occupied by a produce/seafood market. Within the station area are a waiting area and a staffed ticket window. Parking and a bike shed are available at the station forecourt. The station is not staffed by JR Kyushu but some types of tickets are available from the Kushima City Tourism Association which manages the ticket window as a kan'i itaku agent.

== History ==
Japanese Government Railways (JGR) had opened the Shibushi Line from Nishi-Miyakonojō to Sueyoshi (now closed) in 1923. By 1925, the line had been extended eastwards to the east coast of Kyushu at Shibushi. The line was then extended northwards in phases. The first major phase of expansion added 28.5 km of track and several stations, reaching Yowara, which opened as the new northern terminus on 15 April 1935. Kushima was one of the intermediate stations which opened on the same day. At the time of opening, the station was named Fukushima-nakamachi (福島仲町) but was renamed Fushima on 1 October 1959. On 8 May 1963, the track from Shibushi to Minami-Miyazaki was designated the Nichinan Line. Freight operations were discontinued in 1980 and baggae handling in 1985. With the privatization of Japanese National Railways (JNR), the successor of JGR, on 1 April 1987, the station came under the control of JR Kyushu. A new station building was completed in 2023.

== Passenger statistics ==
In fiscal 2016, the station was used by an average of 86 passengers (boarding only) per day.

== Surrounding area ==
- Kushimaeki no eki (くしま駅の駅), literally, "The station at Kushima Station", a large marketplace selling local produce and seafood. This occupies the larger part of the building which also houses the railway station premises.
- Japan National Route 220
- Kushima City Hall

== See also ==
- List of railway stations in Japan
