= Kushima =

Kushima 串間市
- City
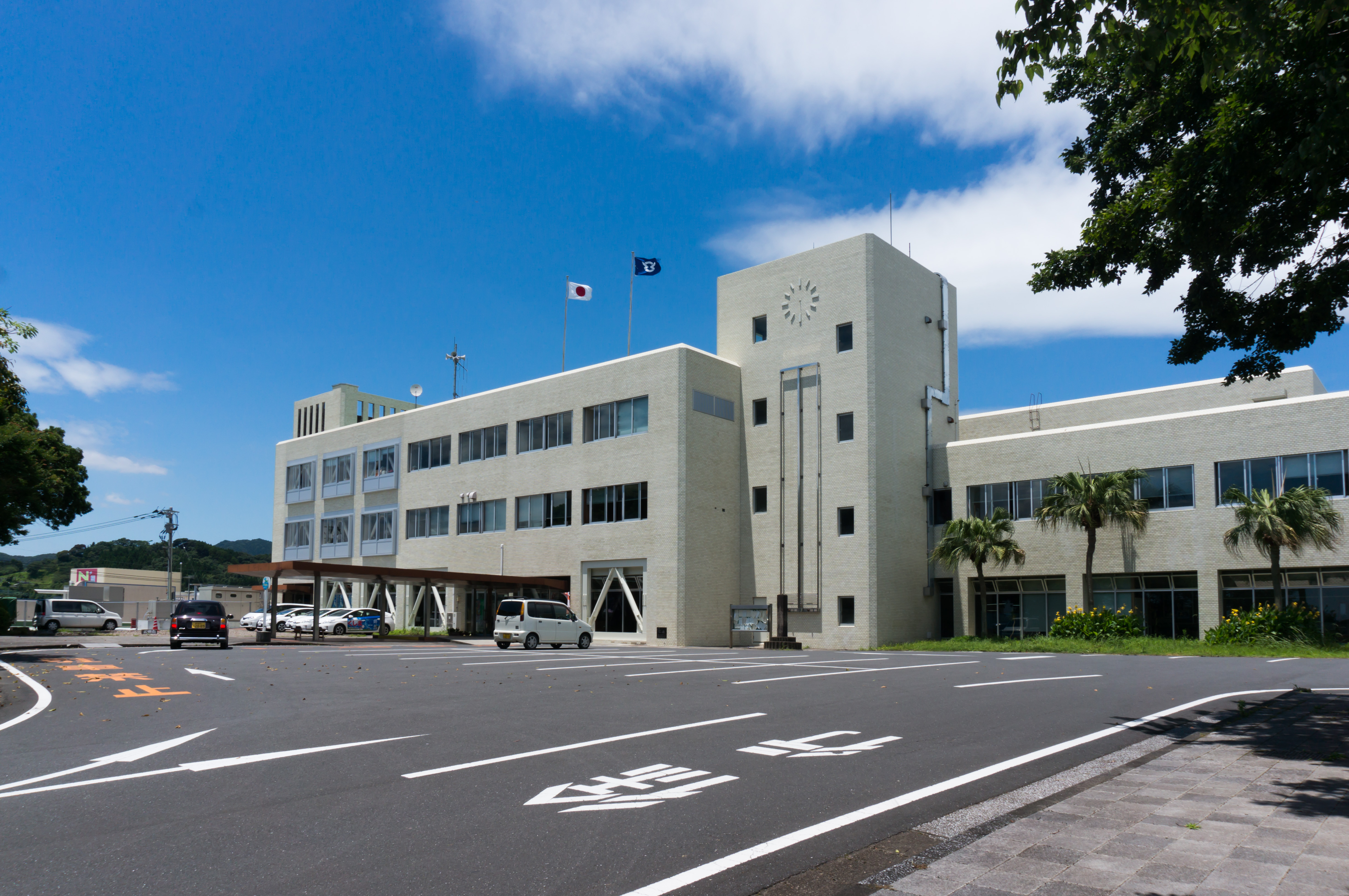
- Kushima City Office

- Flag Emblem

- Location in Japan
- Coordinates: 31°27′52″N 131°13′42″E
- Country: Japan
- Region: Kyushu
- Prefecture: Miyazaki

Area
  - Total: 295.16 km^{2} (113.96 sq mi)

Population (November 1, 2023)
  - Total: 15,623
  - Density: 52.931/km^{2} (137.09/sq mi)
- Time zone: UTC+09:00 (JST)
- City hall address: 5550 Nishigata, Kushima-shi, Miyazakiken 888-8555
- Climate: Cfa
- Website: Official website
- Symbols
- Bird: Warbling white-eye
- Tree: Cerasus jamasakura ( Mountain Sakura)

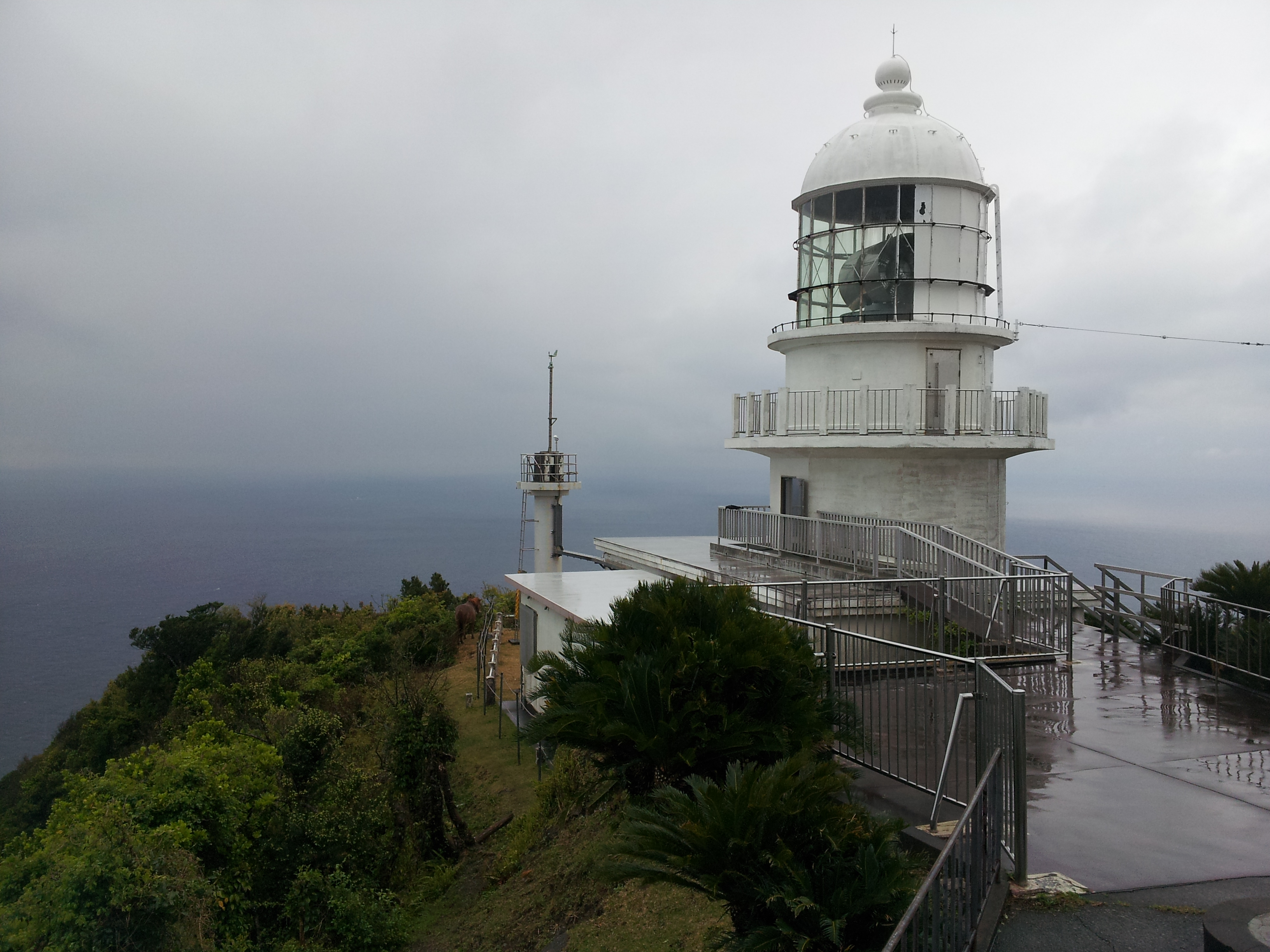
Toimisaki lighthouse

Kushima (串間市, Kushima-shi) is a city located in Miyazaki Prefecture, Japan. As of 1 November 2023, the city had an estimated population of 15,623 in 6950 households, and a population density of 53 persons per km^{2}. The total area of the city is 295.16 km^{2} (113.96 sq mi).

== Geography ==
Kushima is located at the southernmost tip of Miyazaki Prefecture, approximately 70 km south-southwest of the prefectural capital, Miyazaki City. The eastern part faces the Hyūga Sea, and the southern part faces Shibushi Bay. The area along the coast has been designated as the Nichinan Kaigan Quasi-National Park, and there are tourist spots such as Koshima and Cape Toi. The entire city area is not very flat, and there are many hilly areas.

=== Neighboring municipalities ===
Kagoshima Prefecture

- Shibushi

Miyazaki Prefecture

- Miyakonojō
- Nichinan

=== Climate ===
Kushima has a humid subtropical climate (Köppen climate classification Cfa) with hot, humid summers and cool winters. The average annual temperature in Kushima is 17.7 °C (63.9 °F). The average annual rainfall is 2,527.3 mm (99.50 in) with June as the wettest month. The temperatures are highest on average in August, at around 27.4 °C (81.3 °F), and lowest in January, at around 7.8 °C (46.0 °F). The highest temperature ever recorded in Kushima was 38.0 °C (100.4 °F) on 30 July 2026; the coldest temperature ever recorded was −7.9 °C (17.8 °F) on 27 February 1981.

Climate data for Kushima (1991−2020 normals, extremes 1977−present)
Month	Jan	Feb	Mar	Apr	May	Jun	Jul	Aug	Sep	Oct	Nov	Dec	Year
Record high °C (°F)	23.2 (73.8)	24.3 (75.7)	28.4 (83.1)	27.8 (82.0)	32.2 (90.0)	32.8 (91.0)	38.0 (100.4)	37.3 (99.1)	34.5 (94.1)	33.1 (91.6)	29.0 (84.2)	24.1 (75.4)	38.0 (100.4)
Mean daily maximum °C (°F)	13.3 (55.9)	14.5 (58.1)	17.2 (63.0)	21.3 (70.3)	24.8 (76.6)	26.7 (80.1)	30.7 (87.3)	31.6 (88.9)	29.4 (84.9)	25.3 (77.5)	20.4 (68.7)	15.4 (59.7)	22.6 (72.6)
Daily mean °C (°F)	7.8 (46.0)	9.1 (48.4)	12.1 (53.8)	16.2 (61.2)	20.0 (68.0)	23.0 (73.4)	26.8 (80.2)	27.4 (81.3)	24.8 (76.6)	20.1 (68.2)	14.8 (58.6)	9.7 (49.5)	17.7 (63.8)
Mean daily minimum °C (°F)	2.6 (36.7)	3.7 (38.7)	6.8 (44.2)	11.0 (51.8)	15.4 (59.7)	19.8 (67.6)	23.6 (74.5)	24.0 (75.2)	21.1 (70.0)	15.6 (60.1)	9.8 (49.6)	4.3 (39.7)	13.1 (55.7)
Record low °C (°F)	−6.6 (20.1)	−7.9 (17.8)	−4.4 (24.1)	−0.8 (30.6)	5.5 (41.9)	10.1 (50.2)	15.0 (59.0)	16.8 (62.2)	11.2 (52.2)	3.1 (37.6)	−2.0 (28.4)	−5.2 (22.6)	−7.9 (17.8)
Average precipitation mm (inches)	71.8 (2.83)	119.5 (4.70)	161.4 (6.35)	197.7 (7.78)	216.9 (8.54)	531.5 (20.93)	339.8 (13.38)	251.5 (9.90)	283.9 (11.18)	153.8 (6.06)	118.0 (4.65)	81.6 (3.21)	2,527.3 (99.50)
Average precipitation days (≥ 1.0 mm)	6.9	8.2	12.2	10.8	10.7	16.8	11.4	12.6	12.2	8.4	8.3	6.6	125.1
Mean monthly sunshine hours	170.2	156.0	171.5	177.7	174.6	108.4	195.6	211.1	157.5	175.8	163.3	169.6	2,031.5
Source: Japan Meteorological Agency

=== Demographics ===
Per Japanese census data, the population of Kushima in 2020 is 16,822 people. Kushima has been conducting censuses since 1920.

Historical population

Year	Pop.	±%
1920	26,319	—
1925	26,702	+1.5%
1930	28,491	+6.7%
1935	29,782	+4.5%
1940	30,353	+1.9%
1945	40,730	+34.2%
1950	41,648	+2.3%
1955	42,305	+1.6%
1960	41,143	−2.7%
1965	36,425	−11.5%
1970	31,734	−12.9%

Year	Pop.	±%
1975	30,038	−5.3%
1980	29,420	−2.1%
1985	28,328	−3.7%
1990	26,734	−5.6%
1995	25,243	−5.6%
2000	23,647	−6.3%
2005	22,118	−6.5%
2010	20,457	−7.5%
2015	18,779	−8.2%
2020	16,822	−10.4%

Kushima population statistics

== History ==
The area of Kushima was part of ancient Hyūga Province. During the Muromachi period it was ruled by the Nobe clan, who had been dispatched by the Ashikaga shogunate to subdue local clans. Gishō, the son of the 3rd Ashikaga Shogun, fled to Kushima after being accessed of rebellion, and committed suicide at Eitoku-ji temple in northern Kushima in 1441. During the Edo period, the area was mostly an exclave of Takanabe Domain) sandwiched between the holdings of Obi Domain and Satsuma Domain.

Following the Meiji restoration, the village of Fukushima was established within Minaminaka District, Miyazaki on May 1, 1889 with the creation of the modern municipalities system. It was raised to town status on October 1, 1926. On November 3, 1954, Fukushima Town merged with the villages of Otsuka, Honjo, Toi, and Ichiki in Minaminaka District to form the city of Kushima.

From 1992, the city was the center of a political scandal over efforts by Kyushu Electric Power to build a nuclear power plant in Kushima. The mayor of Kushima was subsequently arrested for accepting bribes and paying bribes to city council members to overcome strong local opposition to the plan.

== Government ==
Kushima has a mayor-council form of government with a directly elected mayor and a unicameral city council of 15 members. Kushima contributes one member to the Miyazaki Prefectural Assembly. In terms of national politics, the city is part of the Miyazaki 1st district of the lower house of the Diet of Japan.

== Economy ==
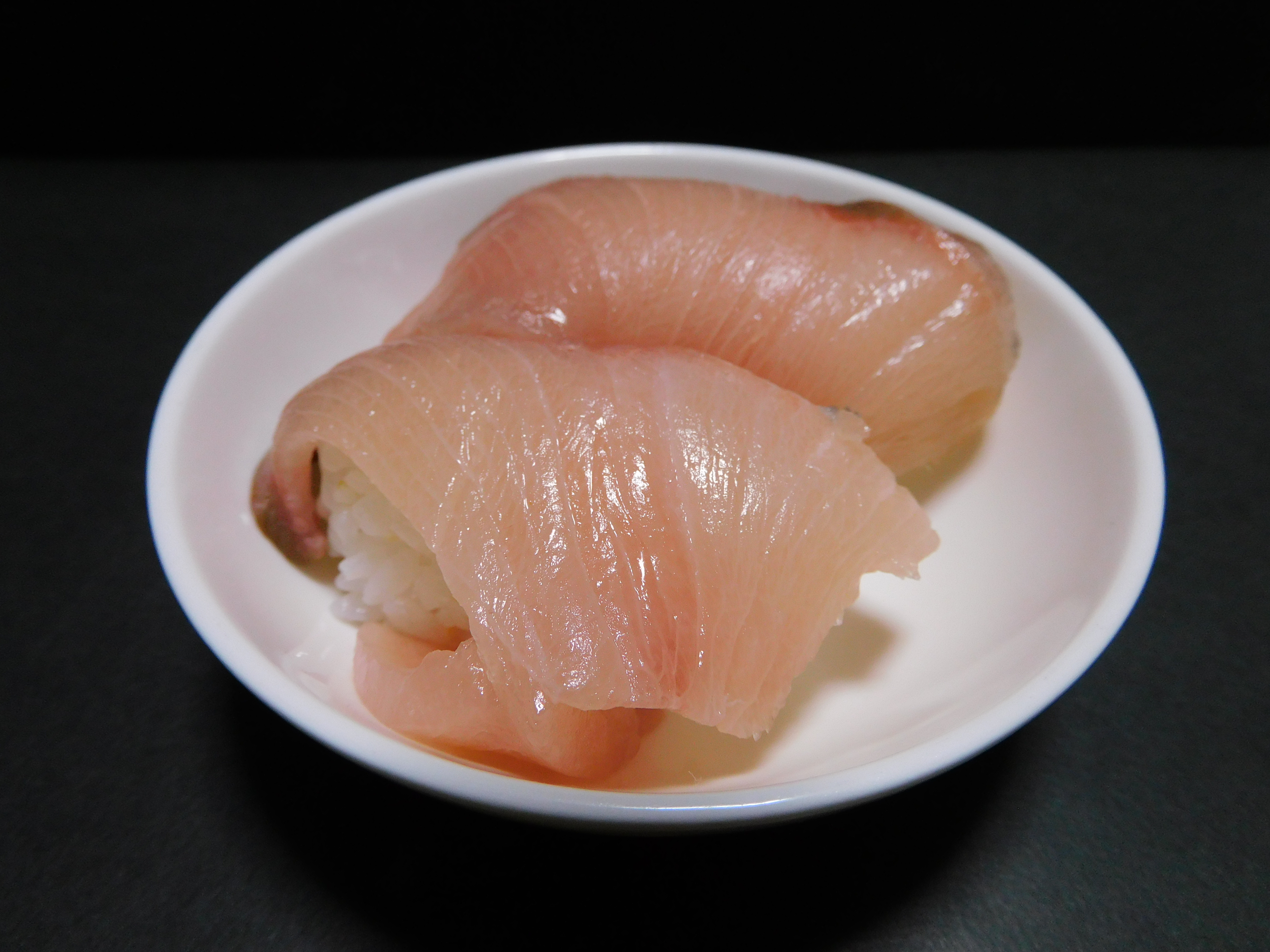
Kurose amberjack sushi, made from locally farmed fish

In addition to tourism, the primary industries of Kushima are agriculture, including livestock, commercial fishing and food processing.

== Education ==
Kushima has ten public elementary schools and one public junior high school operated by the city government, and one public high school operated by the Miyazaki Prefectural Board of Education.

== Transportation ==
=== Railways ===
JR Kyushu - Nippō Main Line

- Hyūga-Ōtsuka - Hyūga-Kitakata - Kushima - Fukushima-Imamachi - Fukushima-Takamatsu

=== Highways ===
- National Route 220
- National Route 448

== Sister cities ==
- Ibiúna, Brazil, sister city since May 21, 1987
- Anguo, Hebei, China, friendship city since September 25, 1995

== Local attractions ==
- Cape Toi
- Koigaura is a surfing spot in Kushima. Every year, in the summer, surfers from all over the country visit this beautiful place.
- Kōjima, known for the field studies site of the Primate Research Institute, where studies on wild-living Japanese macaque monkeys are carried out.
- Toimisaki Lighthouse
