= Miyazaki Station =

Railway station in Miyazaki, Miyazaki Prefecture, Japan

Miyazaki Station 宮崎駅
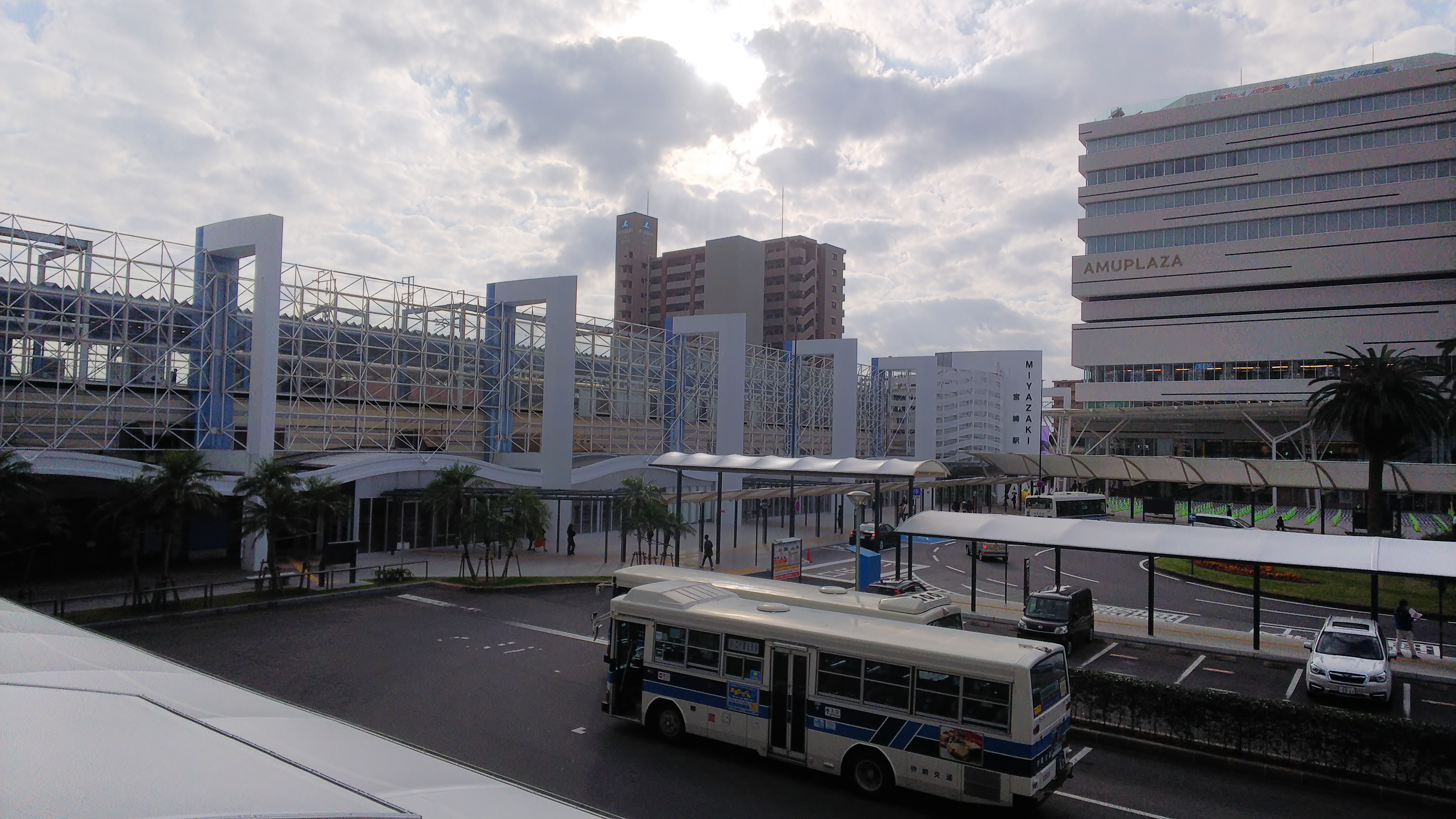
- Miyazaki Station West facade

General information
- Location: 1 Nishiki-chō, Miyazaki-shi, Miyazaki-ken 880-0811; Japan
- Coordinates: 31°54′57″N 131°25′55″E
- Operator: JR Kyushu
- Line: ■ Nippō Main Line
- Distance: 339.9 km from Kokura
- Platforms: 2 island platforms
- Tracks: 4
- Connections: Bus terminal

Construction
- Accessible: Yes

Other information
- Status: Staffed (Midori no Madoguchi)
- Website: Official website

History
- Opened: 15 December 1913

Passengers
- FY2016: 4,773 daily
- Rank: 44th (among JR Kyushu stations)

Services
| Preceding station | JR Kyushu | Following station |
|---|---|---|
| Miyazaki-Jingū towards Kagoshima | Nippō Main Line | Minami-Miyazaki towards Kokura |
Location
- Location within Miyazaki Prefecture Location within Japan

Miyazaki Station (宮崎駅, Miyazaki-eki) is a junction passenger railway station located in Miyazaki City, Miyazaki Prefecture, Japan. It is operated by JR Kyushu and is on the Nippō Main Line.

== Lines ==
Miyazaki Station is a junction station. It is served by the Nippō Main Line and is located 339.4 km from the starting point of the line at Kokura.It is also served by trains of the Nichinan Line and the Miyazaki Kūkō Line which continue past their nominal terminus at Minami-Miyazaki and Tayoshi respectively to terminate at this station.

=== Limited Express Trains ===
- Nichirin (Hakata - Miyazaki - Miyazaki-Airport)
- Kirishima (Miyazaki - Kagoshima-Chūō)

== Layout ==
Miyazaki Station has two elevated island platforms and four tracks. Although the central station of the prefectural capital, it was the only station in JR Kyushu that did not have automatic ticket gates, but automatic ticket gates were introduced on November 7, 2015 in conjunction with the introduction of SUGOCA in the Miyazaki area. Previously, there were separate ticket gates at the bottom of the stairs from each platform, but as of March 19, 2020, they have been consolidated into one location. There is no detention track on the premises, and when a train is detained, it is transferred to the detention track at Miyazaki-Jingu Station or entered the Miyazaki Vehicle Center (sometimes it is operated commercially to Minami-Miyazaki Station). The station has a Midori no Madoguchi staffed ticket office.

=== Platforms ===
| 1 | ■ ■ Nippō Main Line | for Nobeoka and Saiki (Limited express and local); Minami-Miyazaki, Miyakonojō and Kagoshima-Chūō |
| 1 | ■ ■ Nichinan Line | for Aburatsu and Shibushi |
| 2 | ■ ■ Nippō Main Line | for Nobeoka and Saiki; Minami-Miyazaki, Miyakonojō and Kagoshima-Chūō |
| 2 | ■ ■Miyazaki Kūkō Line | for Miyazaki Airport |
| 2 | ■ ■ Nichinan Line | for Aburatsu and Shibushi |
| 3 | ■ ■ Nippō Main Line | for Nobeoka and Saiki; Minami-Miyazaki, Miyakonojō and Kagoshima-Chūō (Limited express and local |
| 3 | ■ ■Miyazaki Kūkō Line | for Miyazaki Airport |
| 3 | ■ ■ Nichinan Line | for Aburatsu and Shibushi |
| 4 | ■ ■ Nippō Main Line | for Minami-Miyazaki, Miyakonojō and Kagoshima-Chūō (limited express and local) |
| 4 | ■ ■Miyazaki Kūkō Line | for Miyazaki Airport |
| 4 | ■ ■ Nichinan Line | for Aburatsu and Shibushi |

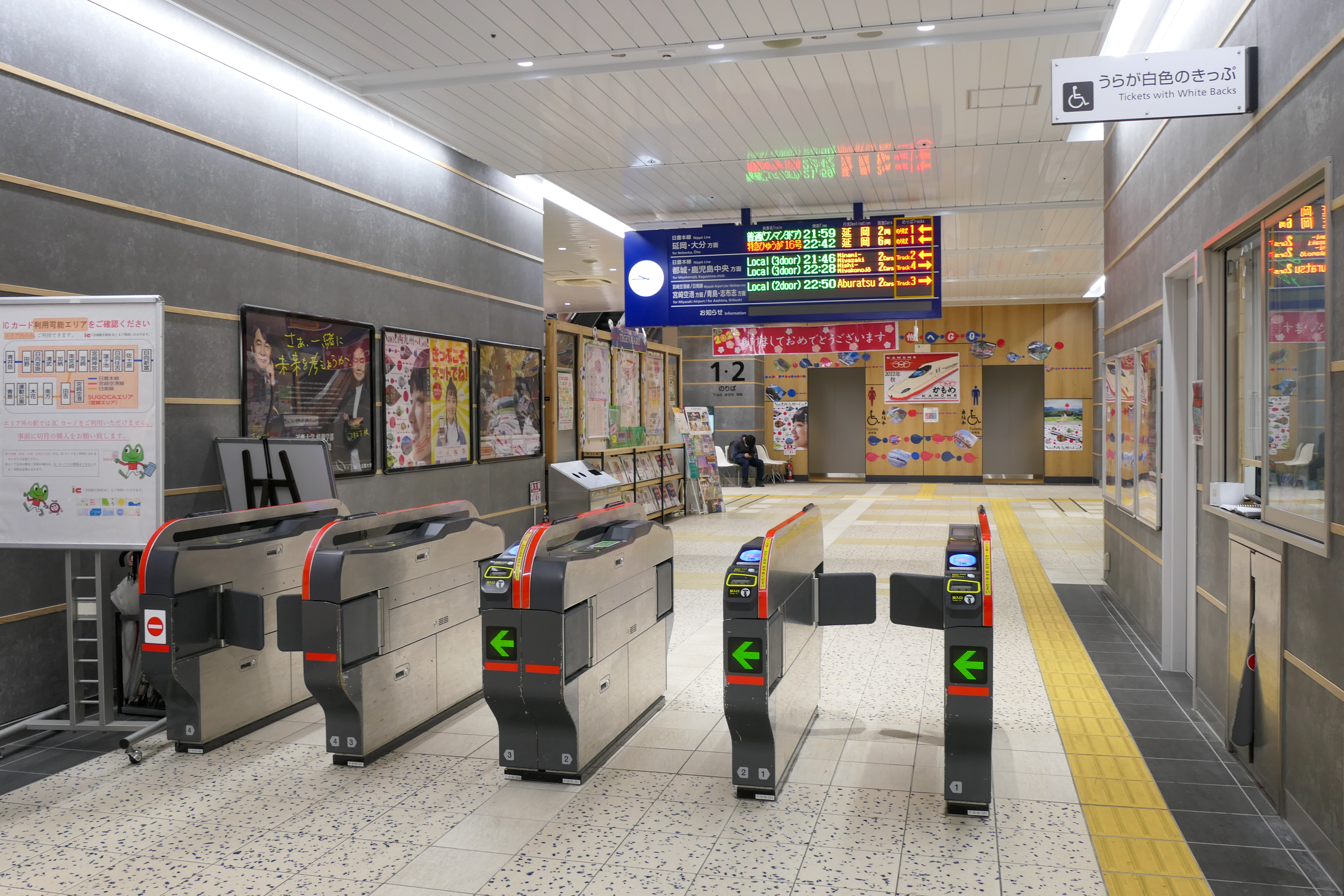
Wicket gates

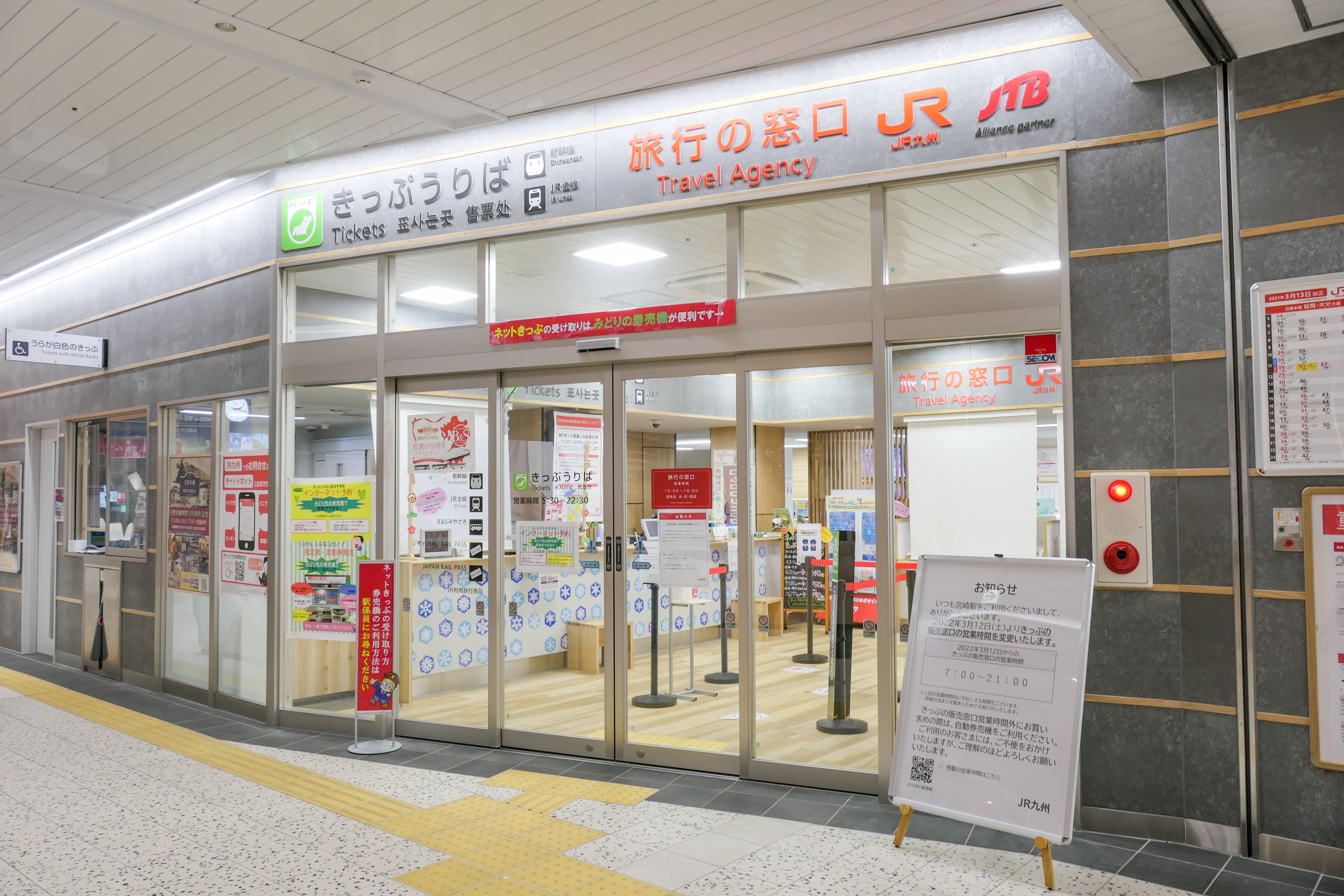
Midori no Madoguchi

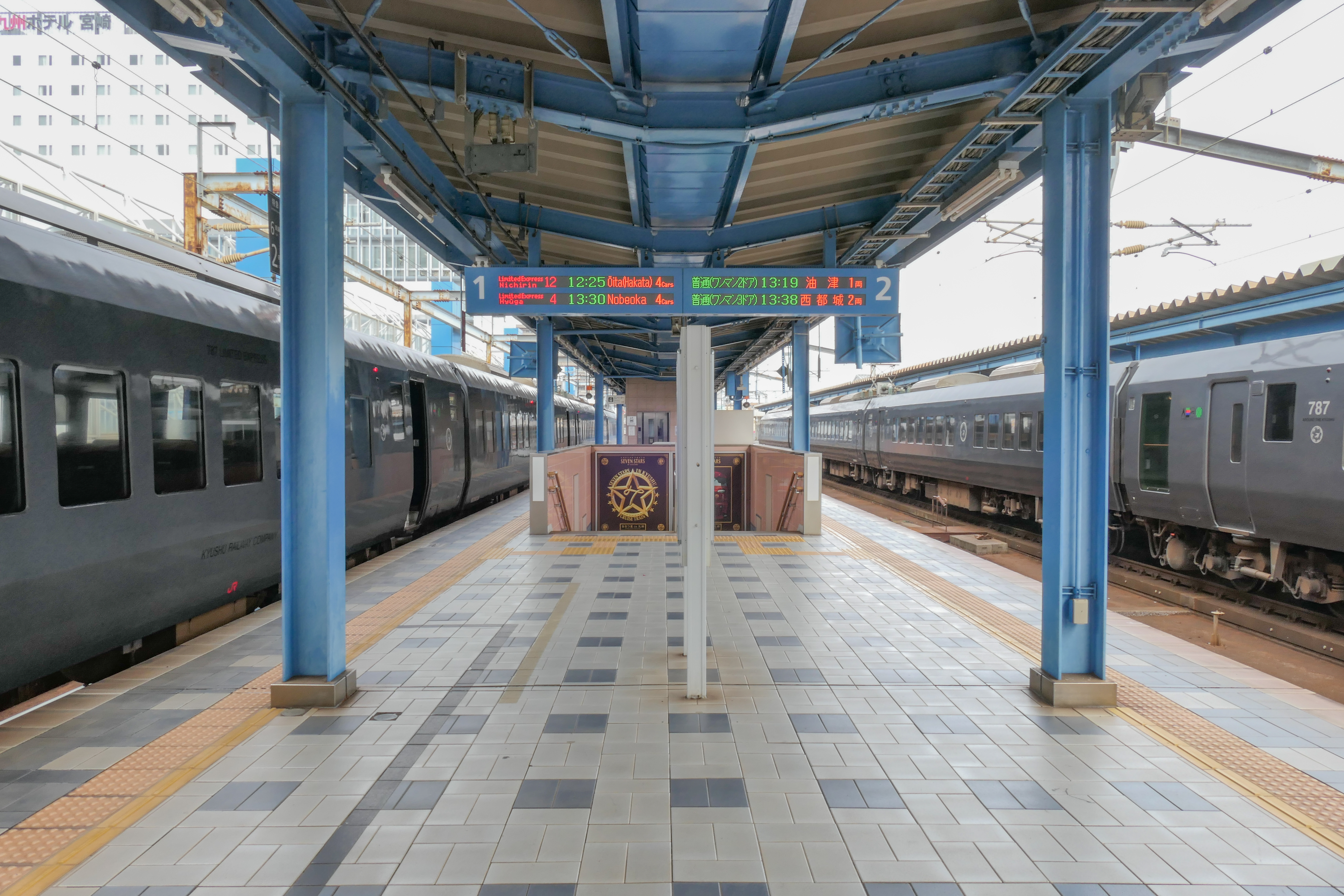
Platforms 1 & 2

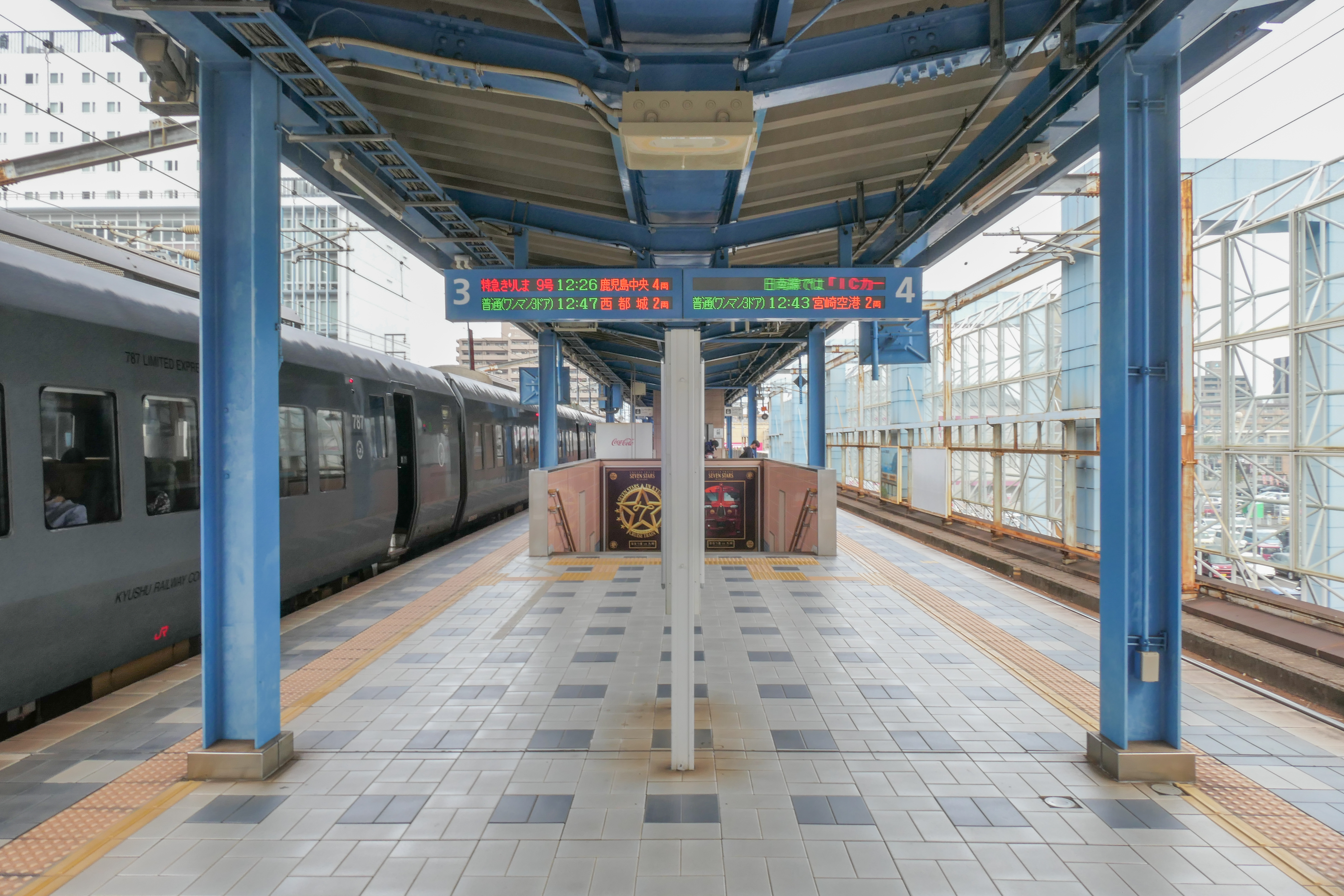
Platforms 3 & 4

== History ==
On 15 December 1913, the Miyazaki Prefectural Railway (宮崎県営鉄道) opened a line from Miyazaki northwards to Hirose (now closed). The Miyazaki Prefectural Railway was nationalized on 21 September 1917 and Japanese Government Railways (JGR) assumed control of the station, designating it as part of the Tsuma Light Rail Line (妻軽便線). By 1920, JGR had extended the track from Hirose northwards to Takanabe. Thus on 11 September 1920, JGR designated the stretch of track from Takanabe, through this station to Miyazaki as part of the Miyazaki Main Line, which at that time already comprised the track from Miyazaki southwards to Miyakonojō. Expanding north of Takanabe in phases, the track eventually reached Kokura and the entire stretch from Kokura to Miyakonojō was redesignated as the Nippō Main Line on 15 December 1923. The original station was destroyed on 15 August 1945 during the Miyazaki Air Raid of World War II. With the privatization of Japanese National Railways (JNR), the successor of JGR, on 1 April 1987, the station came under the control of JR Kyushu.

== Passenger statistics ==
In fiscal 2016, the station was used by an average of 4,773 passengers daily (boarding passengers only), and it ranked 44th among the busiest stations of JR Kyushu.

== Surrounding area ==
- Miyazaki Prefectural Office
- Miyazaki City Hall
- Miyazaki Science and Technology Museum
- Miyazaki Public University
- University of Miyazaki Faculty of Education Junior High School/Elementary School/Kindergarten

== See also ==
- List of railway stations in Japan
