= Shibushi Station =

Railway station in Kagoshima Prefecture, Japan

Shibushi Station 志布志駅
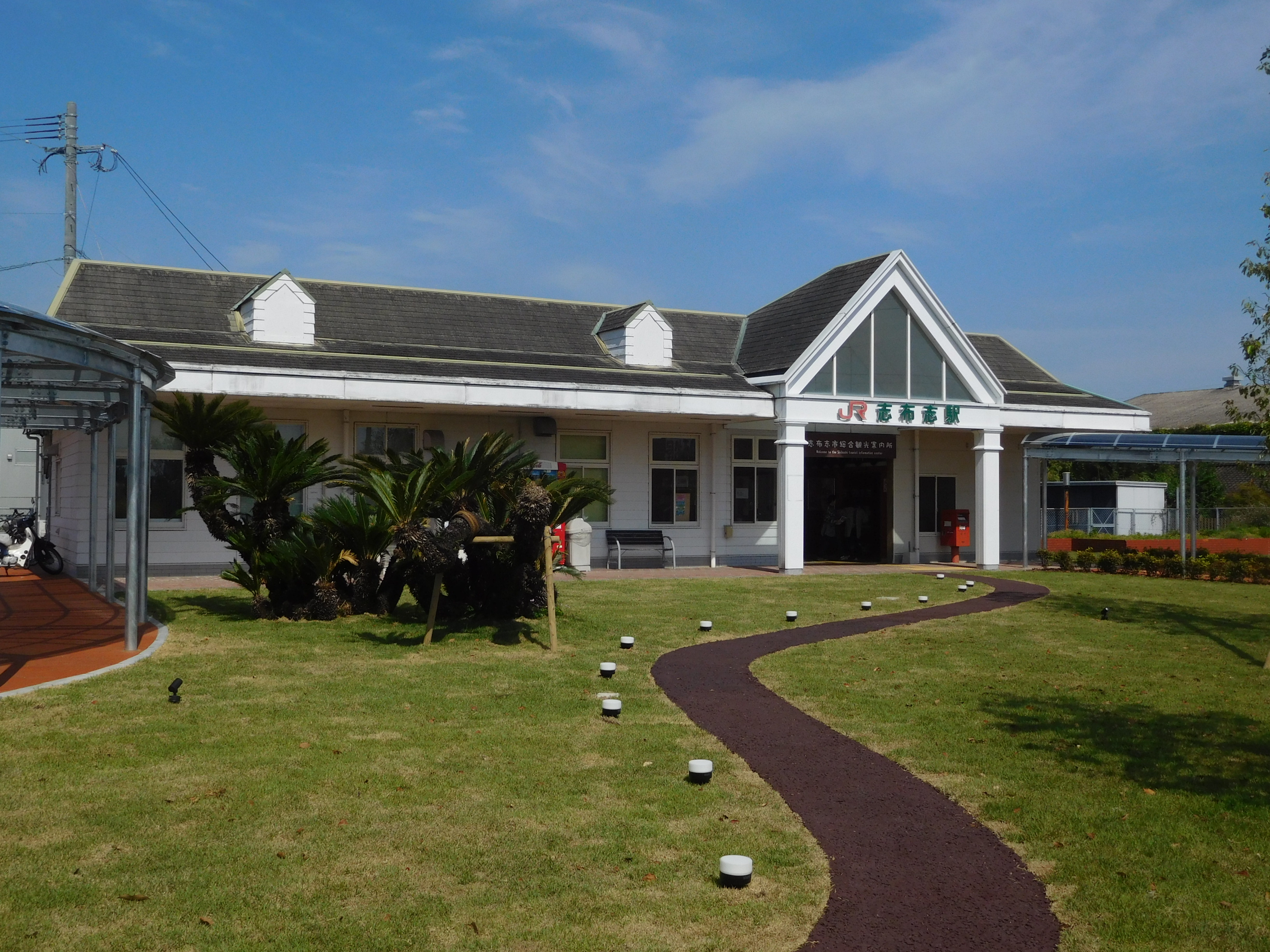
- Shibushi Station in April 2018

General information
- Location: Shibushi-cho Shibushi-2 chome, Shibushi-shi, Kagoshima-ken 899-7103; Japan
- Coordinates: 31°28′22.57″N 131°5′52.70″E
- Operator: JR Kyushu
- Line: ■ Nichinan Line
- Distance: 88.9 km from Minami-Miyazaki
- Platforms: 1 side platform
- Tracks: 1

Construction
- Structure type: At-grade

Other information
- Status: Unstaffed
- Website: Official website

History
- Opened: 15 April 1935

Passengers
- FY2015: 25 daily

Services
Preceding station	JR Kyushu	Following station
Ōsumi-Natsui towards Minami-Miyazaki	Nichinan Line	Terminus
Location
- Location within Kagoshima Prefecture Location within Japan

Shibushi Station (志布志駅, Shibushi-eki) is a passenger railway station located in the city of Shibushi, Kagoshima Prefecture, Japan. It is operated by JR Kyushu and is on the Nichinan Line.

== Lines ==
The station is the southern terminus of the Nichinan Line and is located 88.9 km from the opposing terminus of the line at Minami-Miyazaki.

== Layout ==
The station consists of a single side platform one track, and four side tracks. The current station building and platform were newly built exclusively for the Nichinan Line in 1990 after the abolishment of the Shibushi Line and Osumi Line. The station building stands at right angles to the platform, as it is a terminal station. It is unattended. The current station platform was constructed using the old station freight siding, so the current station building is located approximately 70 meters northeast of the site of the old station building. It was rebuilt with its orientation changed 90 degrees as shown above. As a result, the Nichinan Line has been shortened by approximately 40 meters towards the starting point (toward Osumi-Natsui Station).Shibushi City Tourist Information Center is located within the station building.

=== Platforms ===
1	■ Nichinan Line	for Miyazaki

== Gallery ==
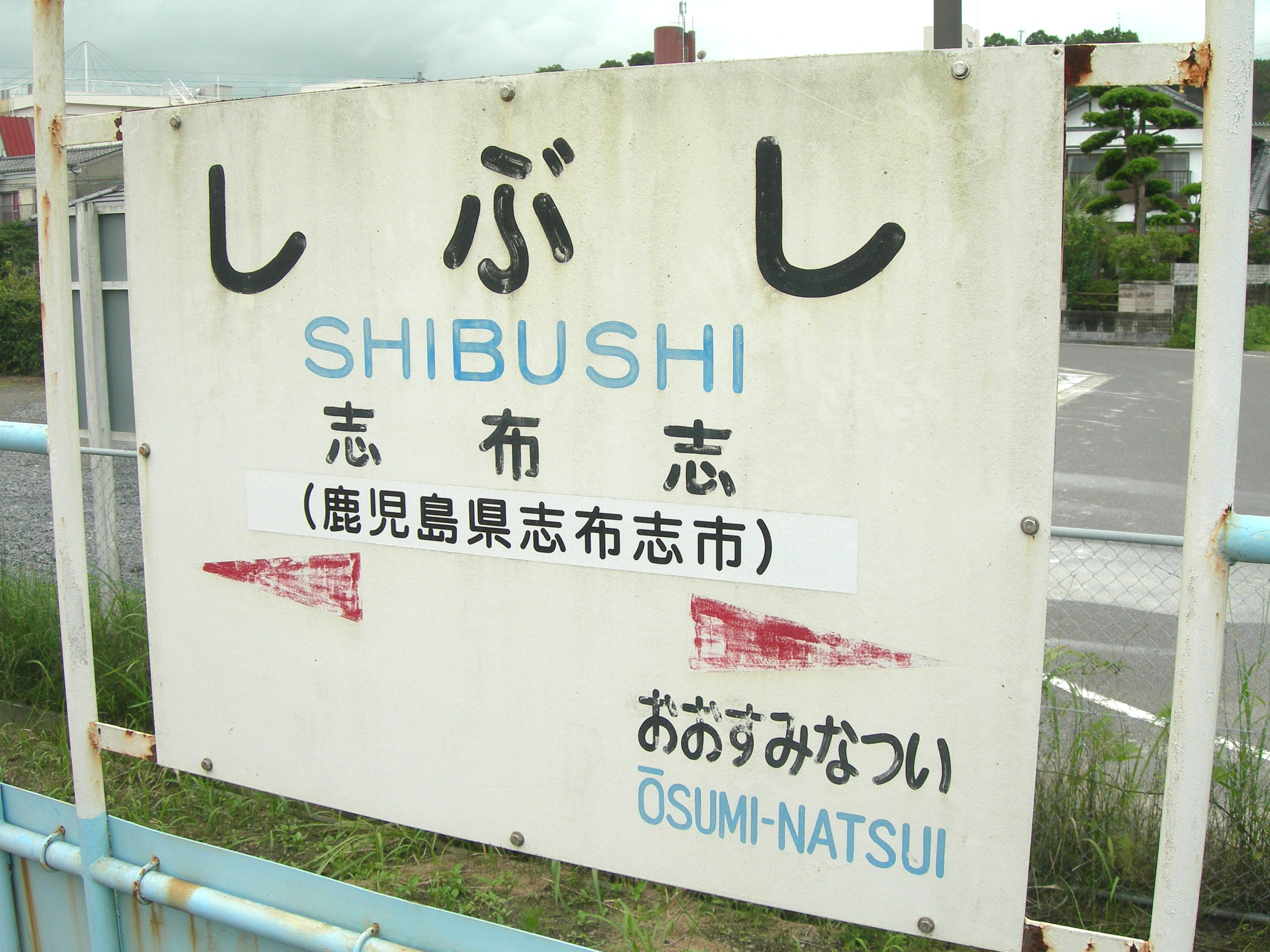
Station sign

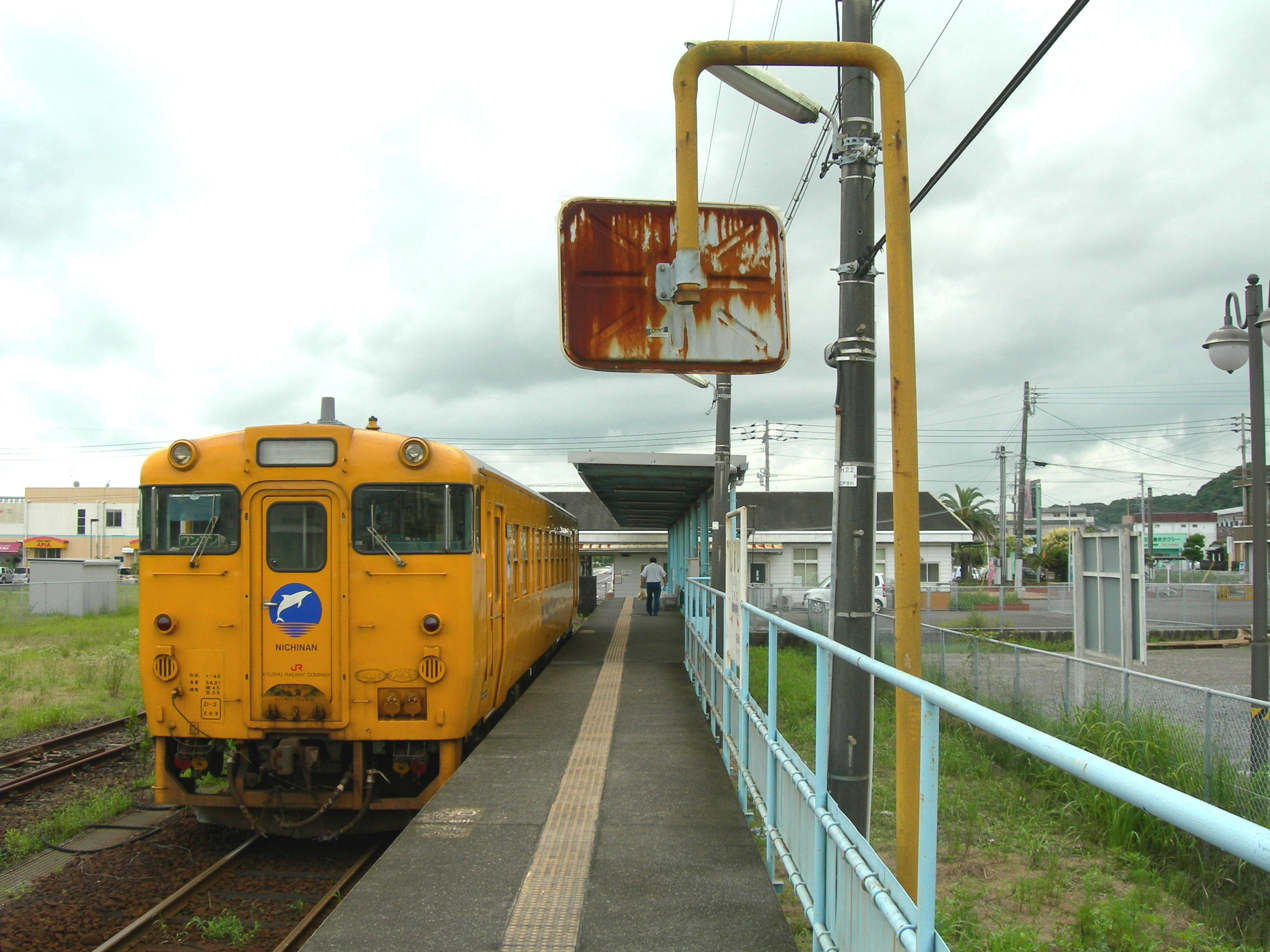
Platform

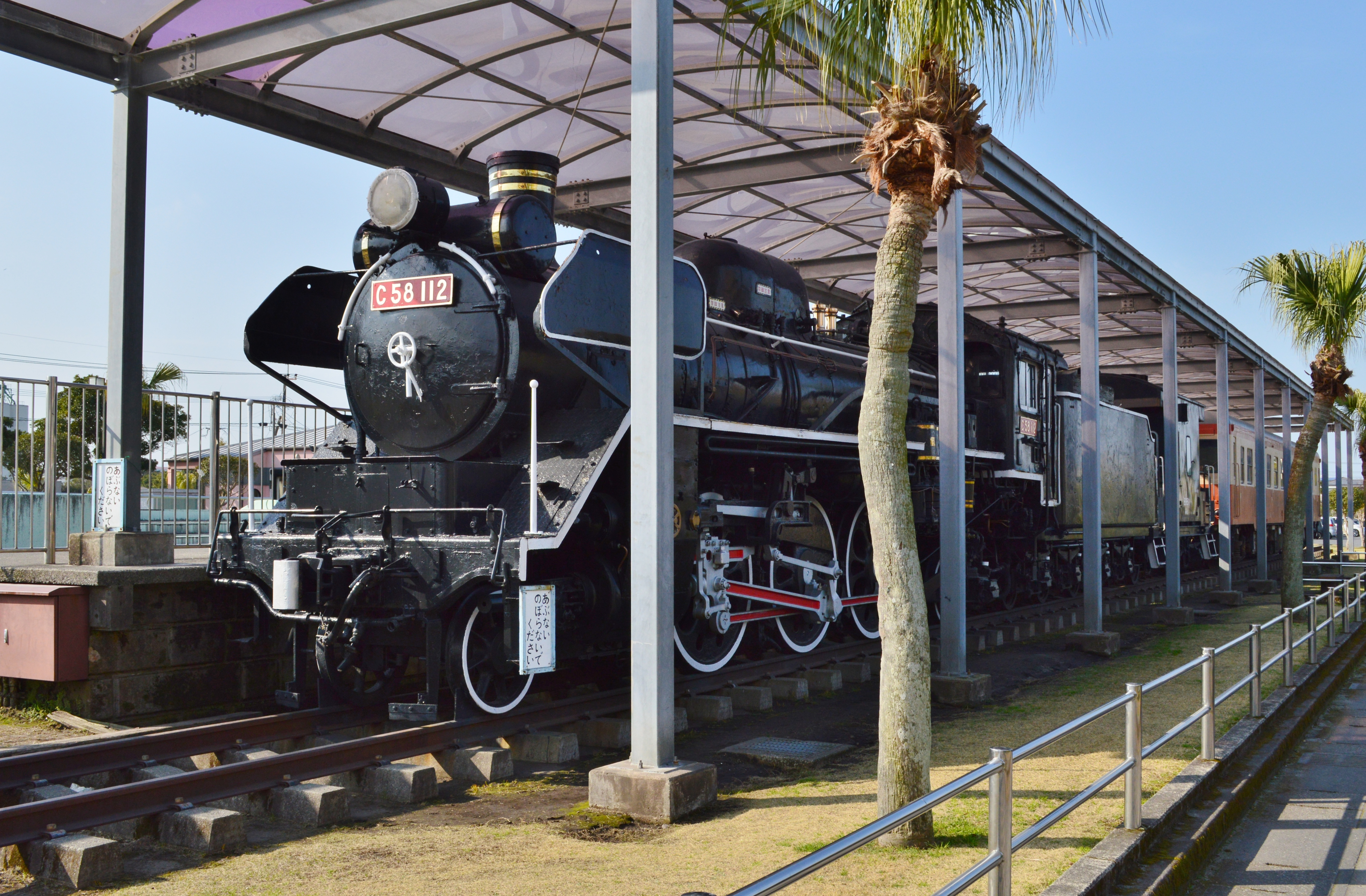
C58 112 at Shibushi Line and Osumi Line Park

== History ==
Japanese Government Railways (JGR) had opened Shibushi Station on 30 March 1925. The route was designated the Nichinan Line on 8 May 1963. With the privatization of JNR on 1 April 1987, the station came under the control of JR Kyushu.

== Passenger statistics ==
In fiscal 2015, the station was used by an average of 25 passengers per day.

== Surrounding area ==
- Port of Shibushi
- Shibushi City Hall
- Shibushi Railway Memorial Park (with a JNR Class C58 on display)

== See also ==
- List of railway stations in Japan
