= Minami-Miyazaki Station =

Railway station in Miyazaki, Miyazaki Prefecture, Japan

Minami-Miyazaki Station 南宮崎駅
- Minami-Miyazaki Station in December 2024

General information
- Location: 2-chōme-2 Higashiōyodo, Miyazaki-shi, Miyazaki-ken 880-0901; Japan
- Coordinates: 31°53′42″N 131°25′20″E
- Operator: JR Kyushu
- Lines: ■ Nippō Main Line; ■ Nichinan Line
- Distance: 342.5 km from Kokura (Nippō Main Line); 0 km (start of the Nichinan Line)
- Platforms: 2 island platforms
- Tracks: 4 + multiple sidings and passing loops north and south of platforms
- Connections: Bus terminal

Construction
- Structure type: At grade
- Parking: Available
- Cycle facilities: Designated parking area for bicycles

Other information
- Status: Midori no Madoguchi (outsourced)
- Website: Official website

History
- Opened: 31 October 1913
- Former names: Akae (until 1 July 1915); Ōyodo (until 1 April 1942)

Passengers
- FY2016: 1,963 daily
- Rank: 93rd (among JR Kyushu stations)

Services
Preceding station	JR Kyushu	Following station
Miyazaki towards Kagoshima	Nippō Main Line	Kanō towards Kokura
Terminus	Nichinan Line	Tayoshi towards Shibushi
Location
- Location within Miyazaki Prefecture Location within Japan

Minami-Miyazaki Station (南宮崎駅, Minami-Miyazaki-eki) is a passenger railway station located in the city of Miyazaki City, Miyazaki Prefecture, Japan. It is operated by JR Kyushu and is the junction between the Nippō Main Line to Kagoshima in the southwest and the Nichinan Line to Shibushi in the south of Kyushu.

== Lines ==
The station is served by the Nippō Main Line and is located 342.5 km from the starting point of the line at Kokura. The station is also the northern terminus of the 88.9 kilometer Nichinan Line, although most trains continue for an additional 2.6 kilometers to terminate at Miyazaki It is also served by the Miyazaki Kūkō Line, although the official stating point of that line is at Tayoshi.

== Layout ==
The station consists of two island platforms serving four tracks at grade. The station building is a modern two-storey concrete structure. The ticket window, passenger waiting area and ticket gates are located on level 2 which connects to a bridge which provides access to the two island platforms. There is a cafe and convenience store in the station building and parking is available at the station forecourt.

Management of the passenger facilities at the station has been outsourced to the JR Kyushu Tetsudou Eigyou Co., a wholly owned subsidiary of JR Kyushu specialising in station services. It staffs the Midori no Madoguchi ticket office.

=== Platforms ===
1, 2, 3	■ ■ Nippō Main Line	for Miyazaki, Nobeoka and Saiki; Miyakonojō and Kagoshima-Chūō
3, 4	■ ■ Nippō Main Line	for Miyazaki, Nobeoka and Saiki
3, 4	■ ■Miyazaki Kūkō Line	for Miyazaki Airport
3, 4	■ ■ Nichinan Line	for Aburatsu and Shibushi
3	■ ■ Nippō Main Line	for Miyazaki, Nobeoka and Saiki
3	■ ■Miyazaki Kūkō Line	for Miyazaki Airport
3	■ ■ Nichinan Line	for Aburatsu and Shibushi

== History ==
The private Miyazaki Light Railway (宮崎軽便鉄道) (later renamed the Miyazaki Railway) opened the station on 31 October 1913 as the northern terminus of a line to Uchiumi (now closed) on the east coast of Kyushu. On 20 March 1915 the Miyazaki Prefectural Railway (宮崎県営鉄道) also opened a line from Miyazaki southwards to Kiyotake with this station as an intermediate stop. On 25 October 1916, the track at Kiyotake was linked up with the Japanese Government Railways Miyazaki Line which had been extended northwards from Aoidake. The Miyazaki Prefectural Railway was nationalized and JGR designated the track to Miyazaki as part of the Miyazaki Line and later, on 21 September 1917, the Miyazaki Main Line. By 1923, the Miyazaki Main Line track had reached north to link up with the track of the Nippō Main Line at Shigeoka. On 15 December 1923, the entire stretch of track from Shigeoka through Miyazaki to Yoshimatsu, including Minami-Miyazaki, was designated as part of the Nippō Main Line.

The Miyazaki Railway line between Minami-Miyazaki and Uchiumi closed on 1 July 1962. Using the route, Japanese National Railways extended its then Shibushi Line north from Kitagō. A link up with Minami-Miyazaki was achieved on 8 May 1963 and JNR redesignated the entire stretch from Minami-Miyazaki to Shibushi as the Nichinan Line.

With the privatization of Japanese National Railways (JNR), the successor of JGR, on 1 April 1987, Minami-Miyazaki came under the control of JR Kyushu.

Throughout its history, the station has changed names several times. It was named Akae (赤江) at its opening on 31 October 1913. On 1 July 1915, it was renamed Ōyodo (大淀). On 1 April 1942, its name was changed again to Minami-Miyazaki.

== Passenger statistics ==
In fiscal 2016, the station was used by an average of 1,963 passengers daily (boarding passengers only), and it ranked 93rd among the busiest stations of JR Kyushu.

== Surrounding area ==
- Ōyodo River
- Miyazaki Prefectural Office
- Miyazaki City Hall
- Miyazaki Prefectural Miyazaki Technical High School
- Miyazaki Prefectural Miyazaki Agricultural High School

== See also ==
- List of railway stations in Japan
