= Umisachi Yamasachi =

Japanese limited express train service

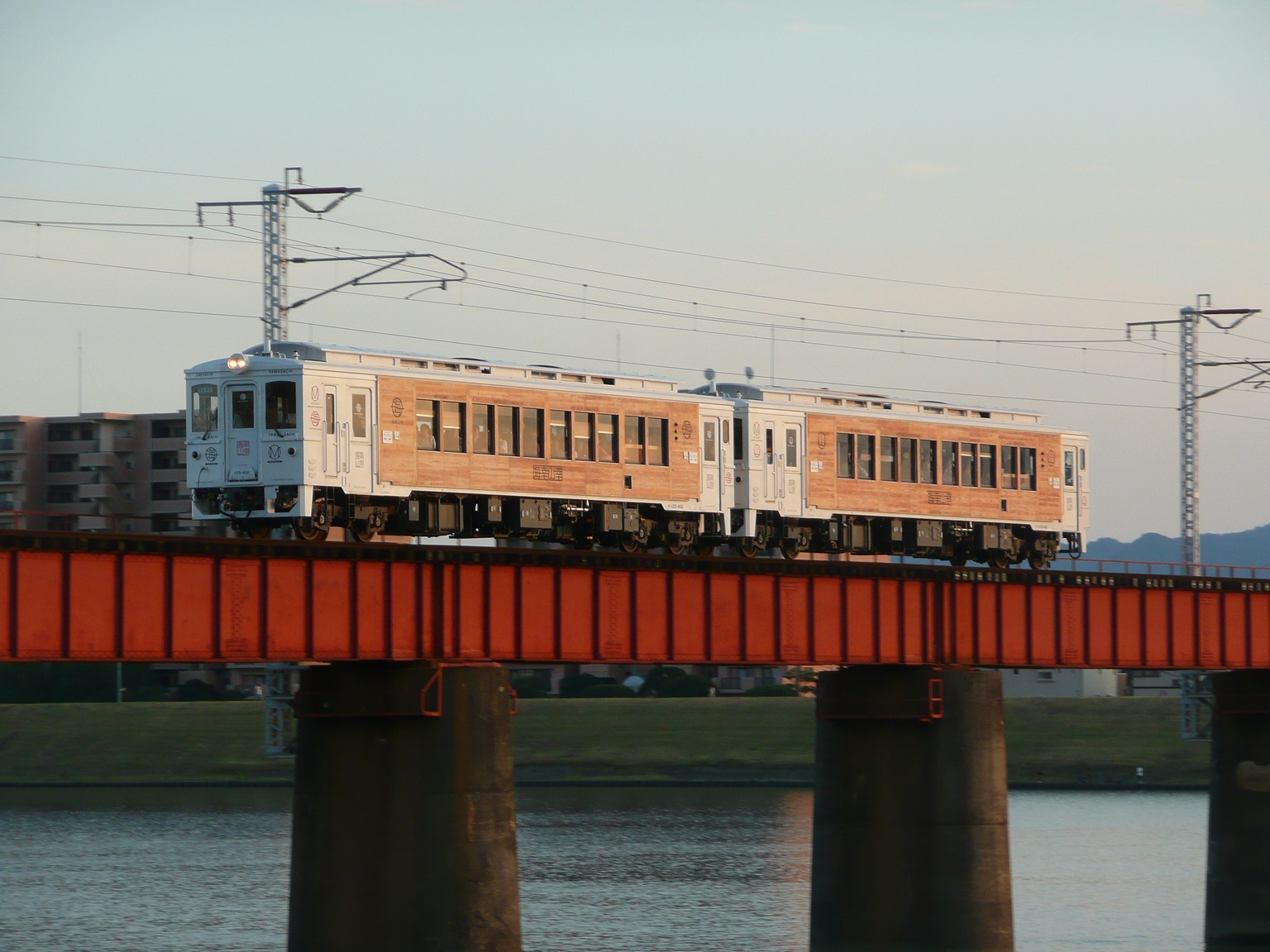

The Umisachi Yamasachi (Japanese: 海幸山幸; hiragana: うみさち やまさち; lit. 'Sea Fortune Mountain Fortune') is a two-car limited express train operated by JR Kyushu in Japan.

== Overview ==
The train began operation on October 10, 2009, and is a 2-car limited express which runs to the resort town of Nichinan along the Nippō Main Line and the Nichinan Line. The consist is that of two converted KiHa 125–400 series cars; car 1, converted from KiHa 125-401 and named Yamasachi, contains 21 reserved seats, while car 2, converted from KiHa 125-402 and named Umisachi, contains 30 seats (9 free seats and 21 reserved seats). During initial operation, the entirety of car 2 was free seating. However, due to the large demand for reserved seats, this was changed later in 2009. The train also contains other sofa and chair seating not assigned to customers.

== Features ==
Special music for the train is played on board. In addition, the train will slow near Aoshima to display the geologic feature known as the Ogre's Washboard. Attendants will also tell the story of Umisachi and Yamasachi, the namesakes of the train, as the legend takes place in southern Kyushu.

Designed by Eiji Mitooka and Don Design and Associates, the train's theme is that of a "toy resort train made of wood" and is clad in obisugi cedar within and without. The refurbished train cars previously ran on Takachiho Railway prior to its closure. The decor features motifs and traditional wooden toys from Miyazaki prefecture.

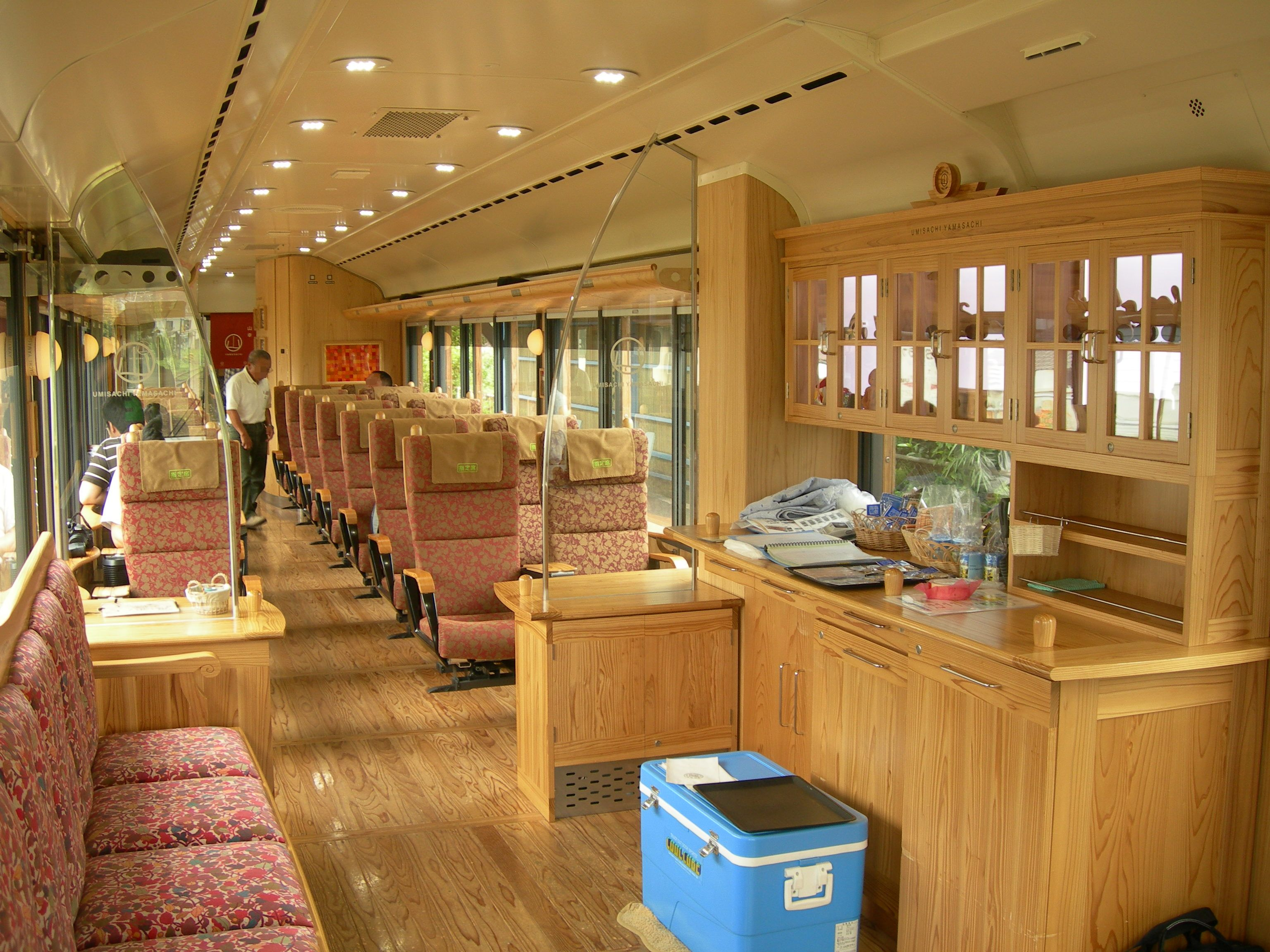
Interior of KiHa 125-401

While the train is in normal operation, it is an excursion train and therefore operates mostly during weekends, holidays, and vacations. It makes one round trip per day. According to NHK World, as of July 2019, it is the tourist train in Kyushu boasting the highest ridership.

The train runs along the longest straight-line conventional railway track in Kyushu.

Car 1 contains an onboard sales counter.

== Stops ==
The service calls at the following stations:

Miyazaki Station - Minami-Miyazaki Station - Tayoshi Station - Kodomonokuni - Aoshima Station - Kitagō Station - Obi Station - Nichinan Station - Aburatsu Station - Nangō Station

As Nangō Station has no facilities for maintenance beside the main line, the train is sent back to Aburatsu until it is needed for the return journey.

== See also ==
- List of named passenger trains of Japan
- Joyful Train, the generic name for excursion and charter trains in Japan
