= Aoshima Station =

Railway station in Miyazaki, Miyazaki Prefecture, Japan

Aoshima Station 青島駅
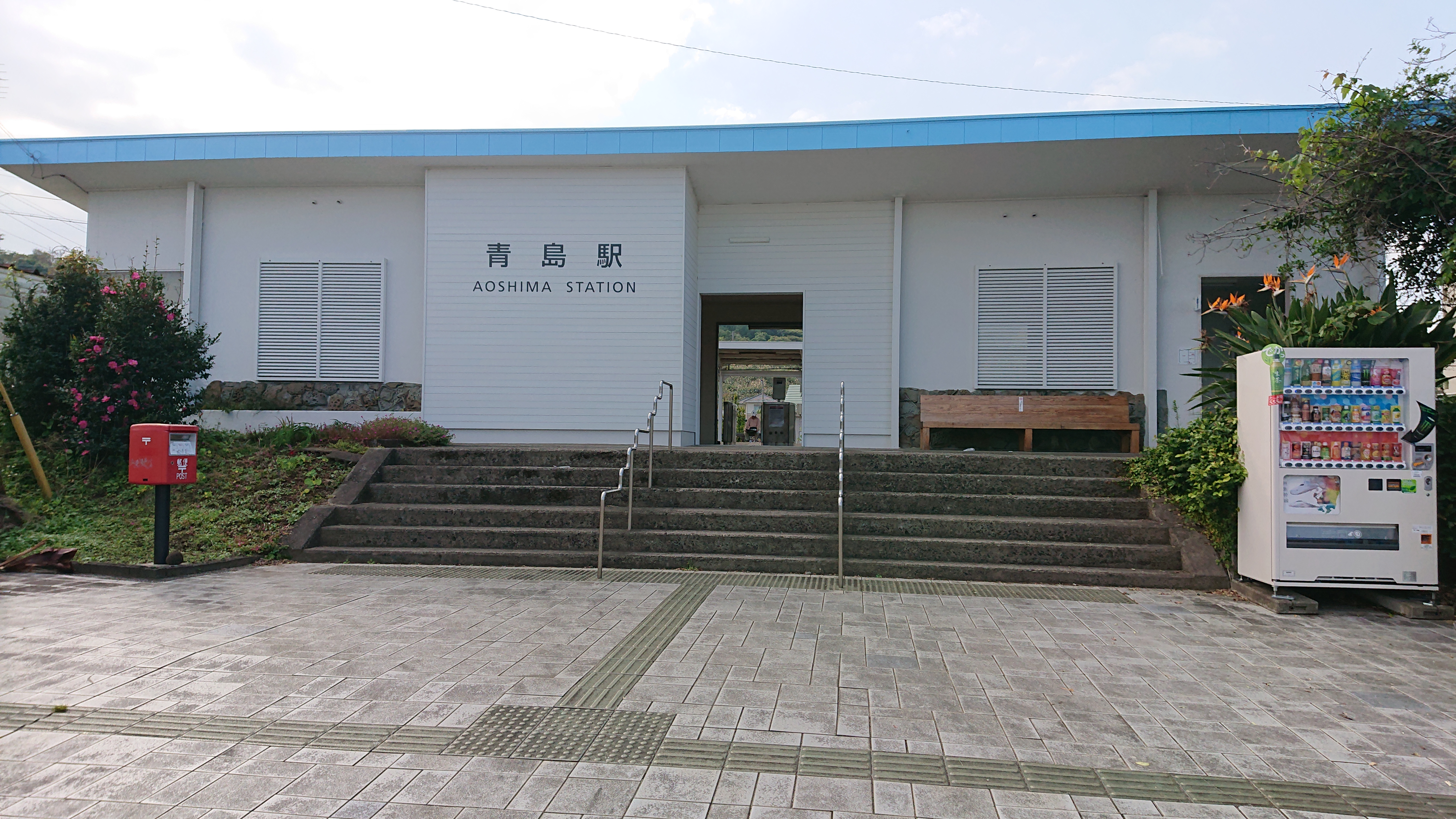
- The station building in April 2020

General information
- Location: 2 Chome Aoshimanishi, Miyazaki-shi, Miyazaki-ken889-2163; Japan
- Coordinates: 31°47′59.28″N 131°28′1.64″E
- Operator: JR Kyushu
- Line: ■ Nichinan Line
- Distance: 12.7 km from Minami-Miyazaki
- Platforms: 1 side + 1 island platforms
- Tracks: 3

Construction
- Structure type: At grade

Other information
- Status: Unstaffed
- Website: Official website

History
- Opened: 31 October 1913

Passengers
- FY2016: 62 daily

Services
Preceding station	JR Kyushu	Following station
Kodomonokuni towards Minami-Miyazaki	Nichinan Line	Oryūzako towards Shibushi
Location
- Location within Miyazaki Prefecture Location within Japan

Aoshima Station (青島駅, Aoshima-eki) is a passenger railway station located in the city of Miyazaki City, Miyazaki Prefecture, Japan. It is operated by JR Kyushu and is on the Nichinan Line.

== Lines ==
Aoshima Station is served by the 88.9 km Nichinan Line between Minami-Miyazaki and Shibushi, and is located 12.7 km from the official starting point of the line at Minami-Miyazaki.

== Station layout ==
The station is unstaffed and consists of one side platform and one island platform serving three tracks. The platforms are connected by a level crossing for passengers to cross the tracks.

=== Platforms ===
1	■ ■ Nichinan Line	for Aburatsu and Shibushi
2, 3	■ ■ Nichinan Line	for Miyazaki and Minami-Miyazaki

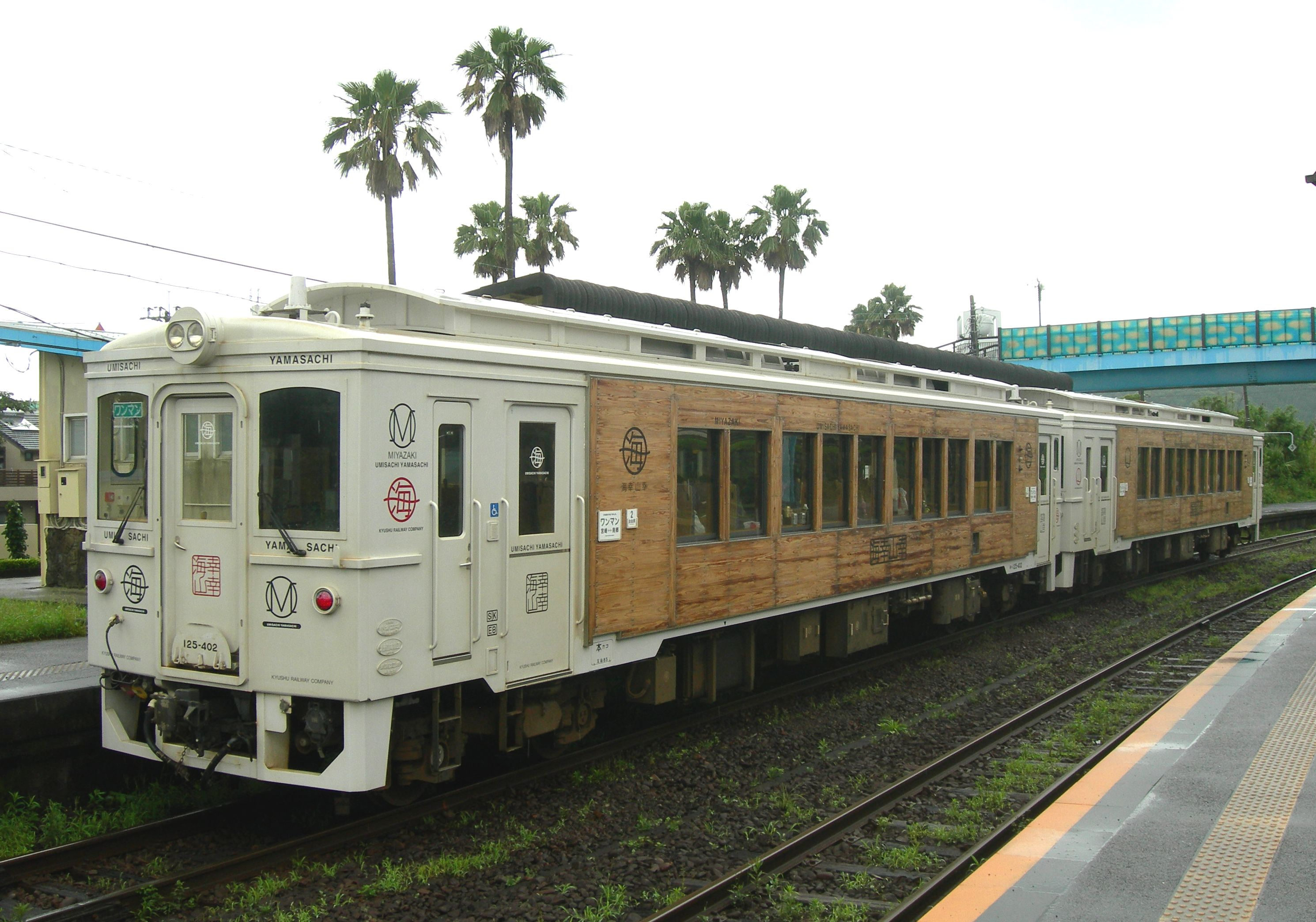
The Umisachi Yamasachi tourist train at Aoshima Station, June 2010.

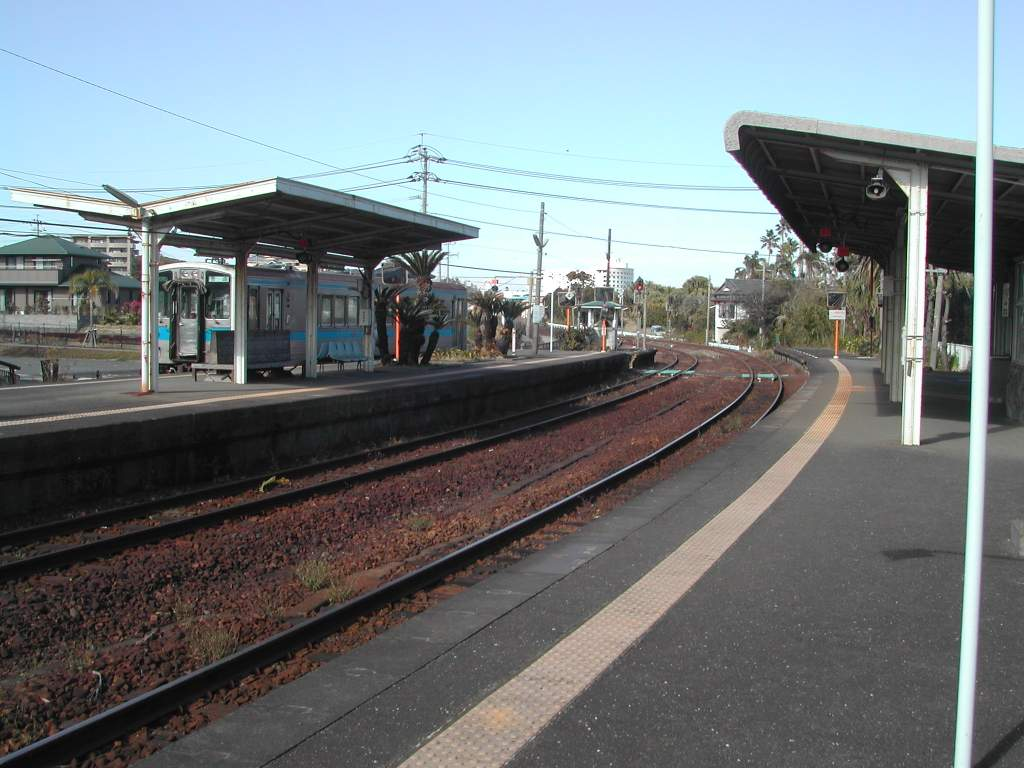
Platforms

== History ==
The private Miyazaki Light Railway (宮崎軽便鉄道) (later renamed the Miyazaki Railway) opened the station on 31 October 1913 as an intermediate station on a line it had laid between Minami-Miyazaki and Uchiumi (now closed). The station closed when the Miyazaki Railway ceased operations on 1 July 1962. Subsequently, Japanese National Railways (JNR) extended its then Shibushi Line north from Kitagō towards Minami-Miyazaki on the same route and reopened Aoshima as an intermediate station on 8 May 1963. With the privatization of JNR on 1 April 1987, the station came under the control of JR Kyushu.

The station became unstaffed from 1 December 1992.

== Passenger statistics ==
In fiscal 2006, Aoshima Station was used by an average of 58 passengers daily (boarding passengers only),. In fiscal 2016, the daily average for boarding passengers had grown slightly to 62.

== Surrounding area ==
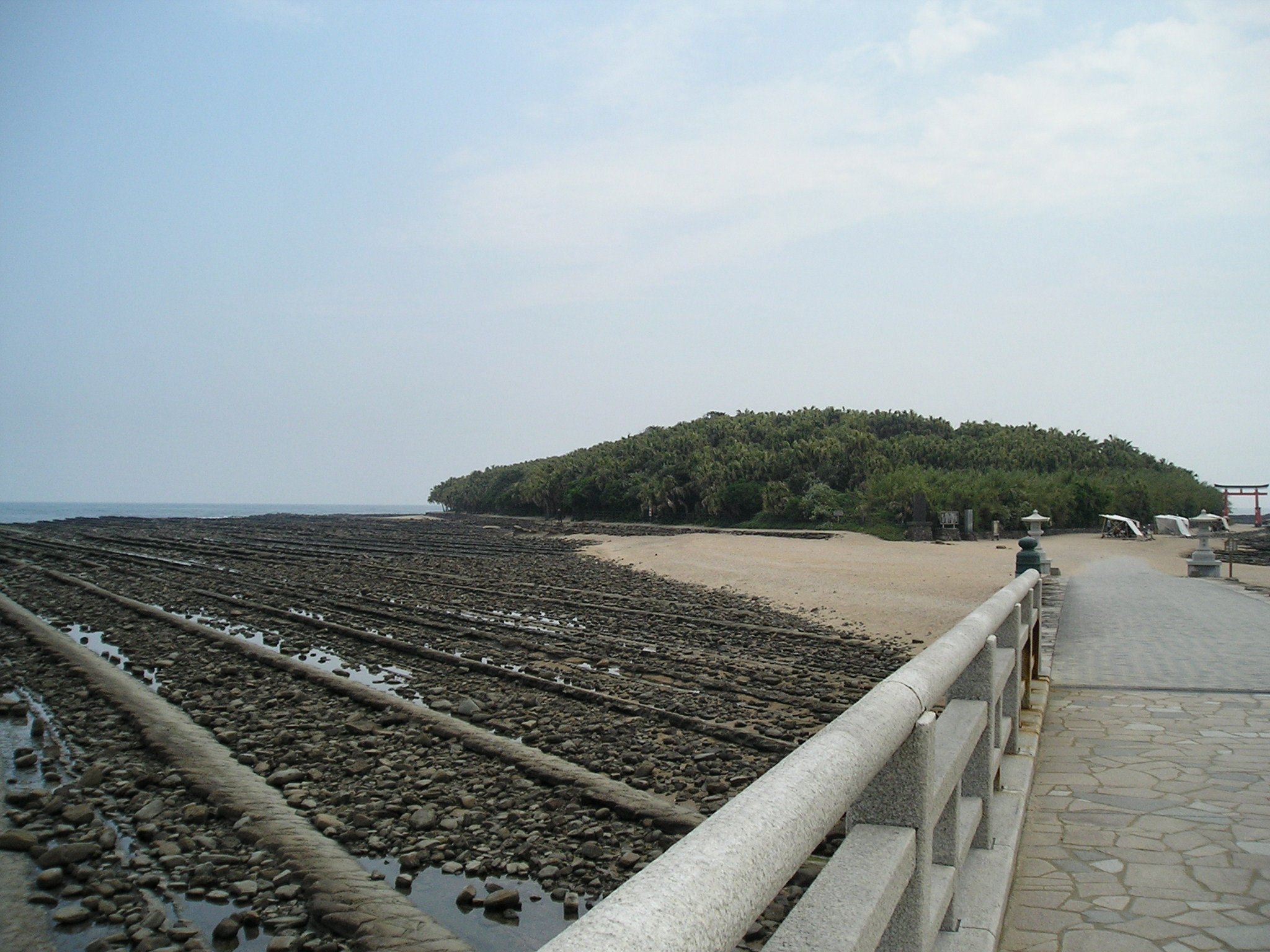
Aoshima Island

- Aoshima Island
- Aoshima Subtropical Botanical Garden
- Aoshima Shrine
- Aoshima Beach
- Aoshima Onsen hot spring resort
- National Route 220

== See also ==
- List of railway stations in Japan
