= Undō-Kōen Station =

Undō-Kōen Station (運動公園駅) is the name of two train stations in Japan:

- Undō-Kōen Station (Gunma)
- Undōkōen Station (Miyazaki)
