= Minamikata Station =

Minamikata Station is the name of two train stations in Japan:

- Minamikata Station (Miyazaki)
- Minamikata Station (Osaka)
