= Sosanji Station =

Railway station in Miyazaki, Miyazaki Prefecture, Japan

Sosanji Station 曽山寺駅
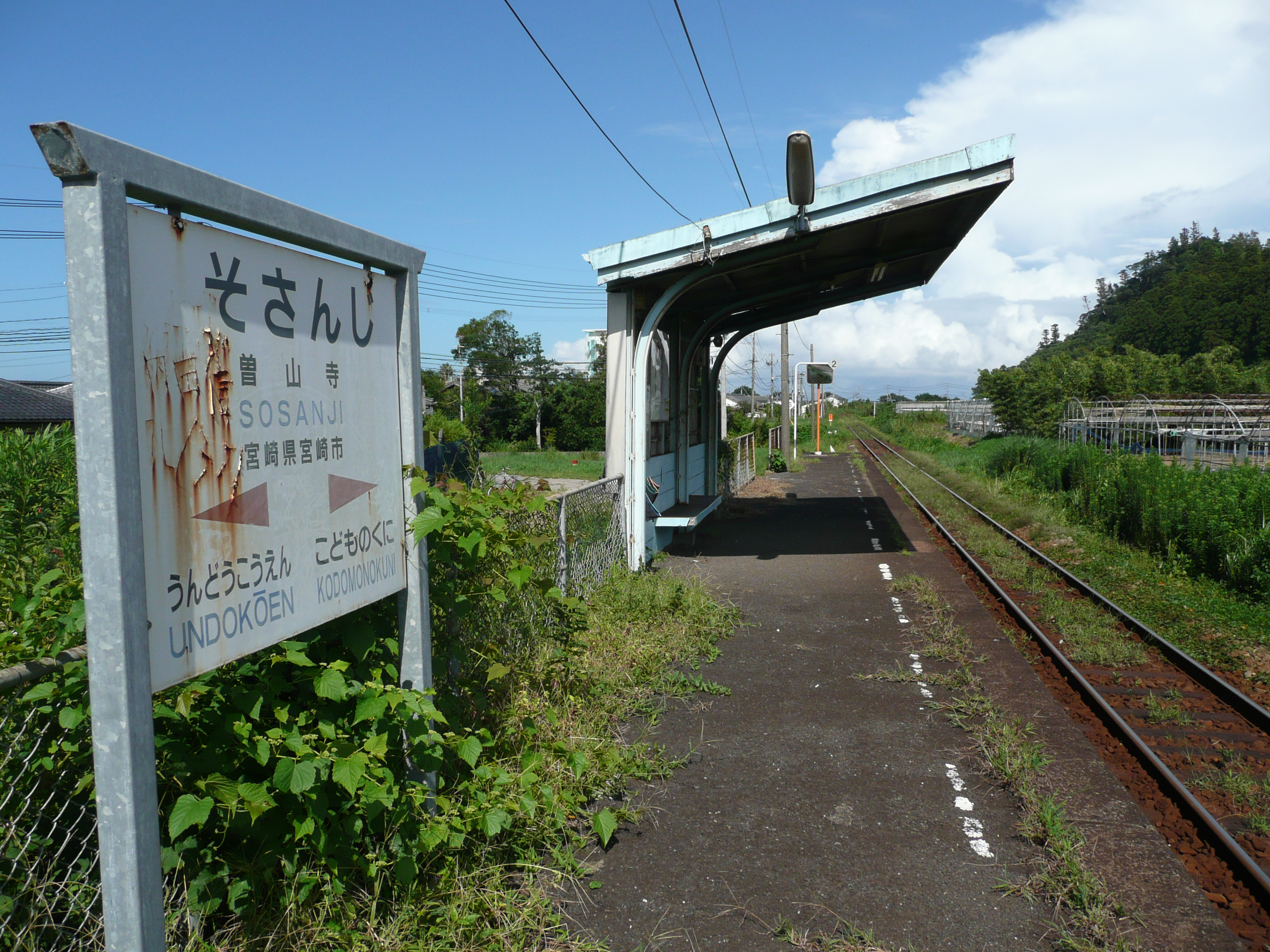
- Sosanji Station in 2007

General information
- Location: Kaeda, Miyazaki-shi, Miyazaki-ken 889-2161; Japan
- Coordinates: 31°48′48″N 131°26′54″E
- Operator: JR Kyushu
- Line: ■ Nichinan Line
- Distance: 10.2 km from Minami-Miyazaki
- Platforms: 1 side platform
- Tracks: 1

Construction
- Structure type: At grade
- Accessible: Yes - ramp to platform

Other information
- Status: Unstaffed
- Website: Official website

History
- Opened: 20 March 1915

Passengers
- FY2016: 21 daily

Services
Preceding station	JR Kyushu	Following station
Undōkōen towards Minami-Miyazaki	Nichinan Line	Kodomonokuni towards Shibushi
Location
- Location within Miyazaki Prefecture Location within Japan

Sosanji Station (曽山寺駅, Sosanji-eki) is a passenger railway station located in the city of Miyazaki City, Miyazaki Prefecture, Japan. It is operated by JR Kyushu and is on the Nichinan Line.

== Lines ==
Sosanji Station is served by the Nichinan Line and is located 10.2 km from the starting point of the line at Minami-Miyazaki.

== Layout ==
The station, which is unstaffed, consists of a side platform serving a single track at grade in an area of rural farmland. There is no station building, only a simple shelter made from disused rails on the platform.

== History ==
The private Miyazaki Light Railway (宮崎軽便鉄道) (later renamed the Miyazaki Railway) opened the station on 20 March 1915 as an additional station on a line which it had laid in 1913 between Minami-Miyazaki and Uchiumi (now closed). The station closed when the Miyazaki Railway ceased operations on 1 July 1962. Subsequently, Japanese National Railways (JNR) extended its then Shibushi Line north from Kitagō towards Minami-Miyazaki on the same route and reopened Sosanji as an intermediate station on 8 May 1963. In 1978 the platform was extended by 20 meters, giving it an effective length of 90 meters. With the privatization of JNR on 1 April 1987, the station came under the control of JR Kyushu.

== Passenger statistics ==
In fiscal 2016, the station was used by an average of 21 passengers (boarding only) per day.

== Surrounding area ==
- Nichinan Kaigan Road Park
- Sozanji Rural Training Center

== See also ==
- List of railway stations in Japan
