= Kibana Station =

Railway station in Miyazaki, Miyazaki Prefecture, Japan

Kibana Station 木花駅
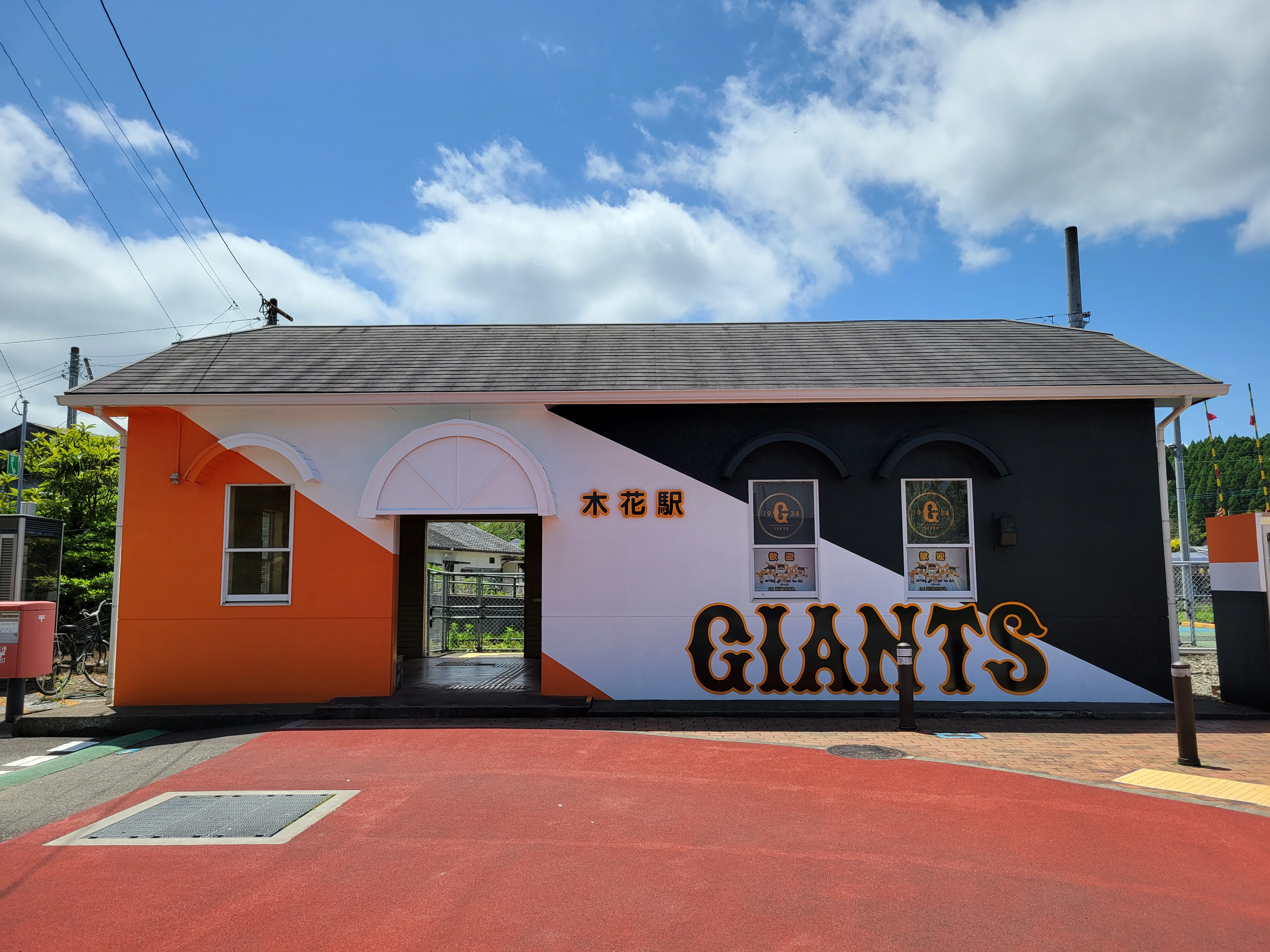
- Kibana Station in April 2022

General information
- Location: Kumano, Miyazaki-shi, Miyazaki-ken 889-2151; Japan
- Coordinates: 31°49′54″N 131°26′12″E
- Operator: JR Kyushu
- Line: ■ Nichinan Line
- Distance: 7.5 km from Minami-Miyazaki
- Platforms: 1 island platform
- Tracks: 2 + 1 siding

Construction
- Structure type: At grade
- Cycle facilities: Bike shed
- Accessible: Yes - level crossing and ramps to platform

Other information
- Status: Unstaffed
- Website: Official website

History
- Opened: 31 October 1913

Passengers
- FY2016: 353 daily
- Rank: 287th (among JR Kyushu stations)

Services
| Preceding station | JR Kyushu | Following station |
|---|---|---|
| Minamikata towards Minami-Miyazaki | Nichinan Line | Undōkōen towards Shibushi |
Location
- Location within Miyazaki Prefecture Location within Japan

Kibana Station (木花駅, Kibana-eki) is a passenger railway station located in the city of Miyazaki City, Miyazaki Prefecture, Japan. It is operated by JR Kyushu and is on the Nichinan Line.

== Lines ==
Kibana Station is served by the Nichinan Line and is located 7.5 km from the starting point of the line at Minami-Miyazaki.

== Layout ==
The station, which is unstaffed, consists of an unnumbered island platform serving two tracks at grade set in a largely residential area. The station building is located on the east side of the tracks and is a timber building decorated with triangular gables and stained glass. It is unstaffed and serves only as a waiting room. A level crossing leads to the island platform where an automatic ticket vending machine is located. A separate station entrance on the west side has also been constructed which includes a bike shed and a station forecourt with a bus stop and a traffic roundabout. From there a level crossing leads to the island platform.

=== Platforms ===
| East side | ■ ■Nichinan Line | for Aburatsu and Shibushi |
| West side | ■ ■ Nichinan Line | for Minami-Miyazaki and Miyazaki |

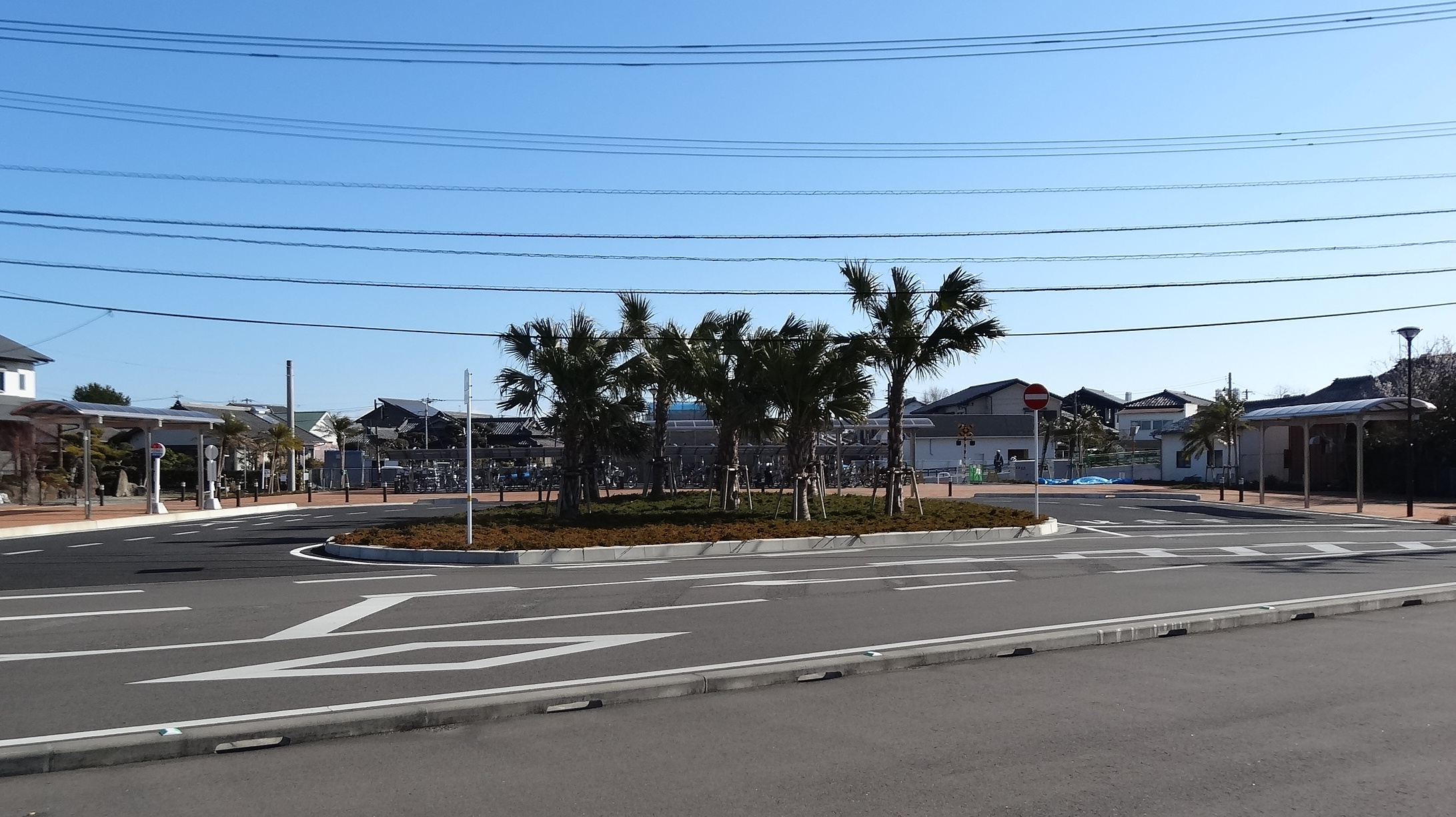
A wide angle view of the west entrance. The station building is on the other side of the tracks.

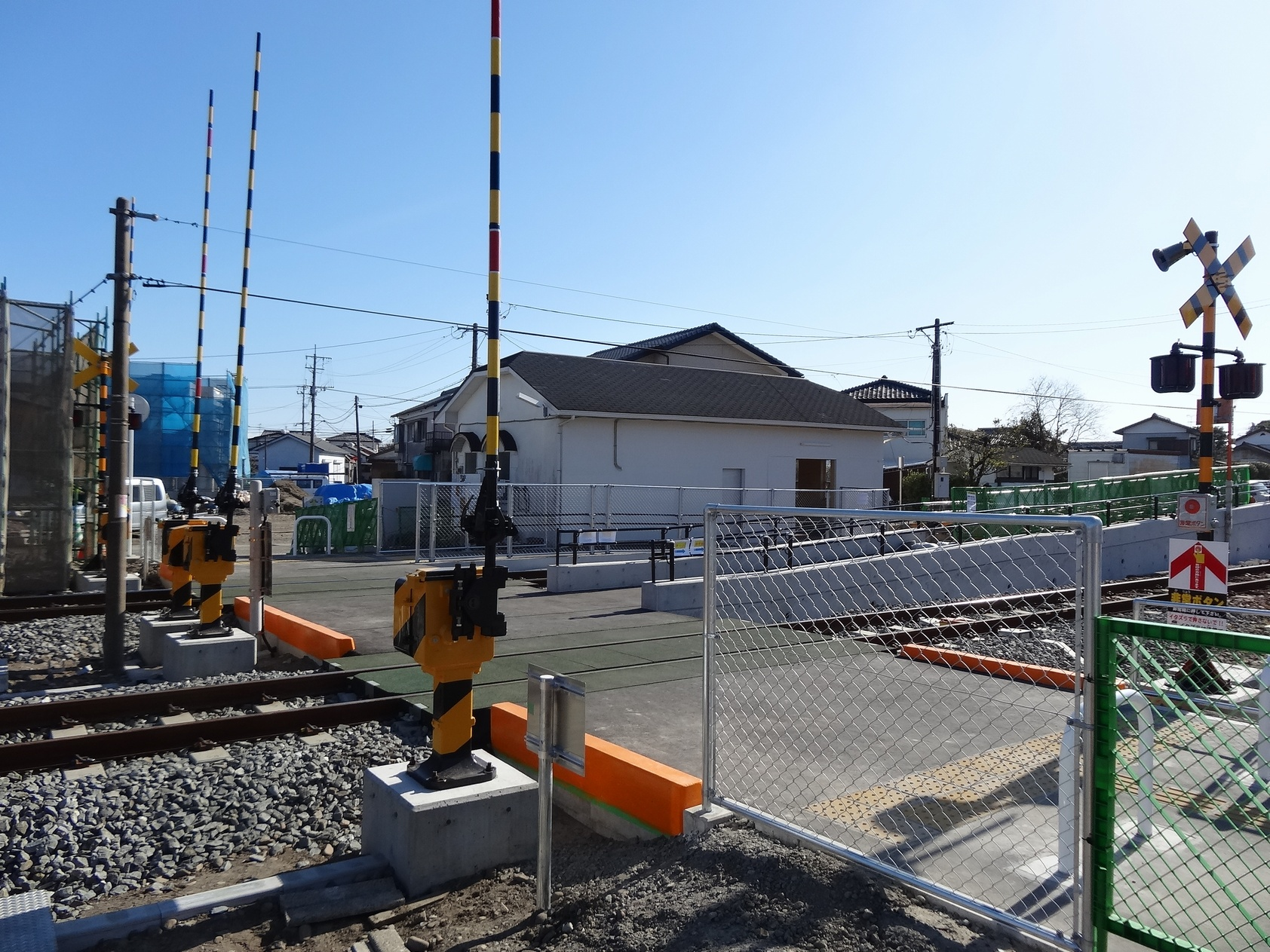
The west entrance with detail of the level crossing.

== History ==
The private Miyazaki Light Railway (宮崎軽便鉄道) (later renamed the Miyazaki Railway) opened the station on 31 October 1913 as an intermediate station on a line it had laid between Minami-Miyazaki and Uchiumi (now closed). The station closed when the Miyazaki Railway ceased operations on 1 July 1962. Subsequently, Japanese National Railways (JNR) extended its then Shibushi Line north from Kitagō towards Minami-Miyazaki on the same route and reopened Minamikata as an intermediate station on 8 May 1963. With the privatization of JNR on 1 April 1987, the station came under the control of JR Kyushu.

== Passenger statistics ==
In fiscal 2016, the station was used by an average of 353 passengers daily (boarding passengers only), and it ranked 287th among the busiest stations of JR Kyushu.

== Surrounding area ==
- University of Miyazaki
- Kizakihama Beach (famous surfing spot)
- Miyazaki City Konohana Elementary School

== See also ==
- List of railway stations in Japan
