= University of Miyazaki =

Coordinates: 31°56′02″N 131°25′08″E

- 宮崎大学
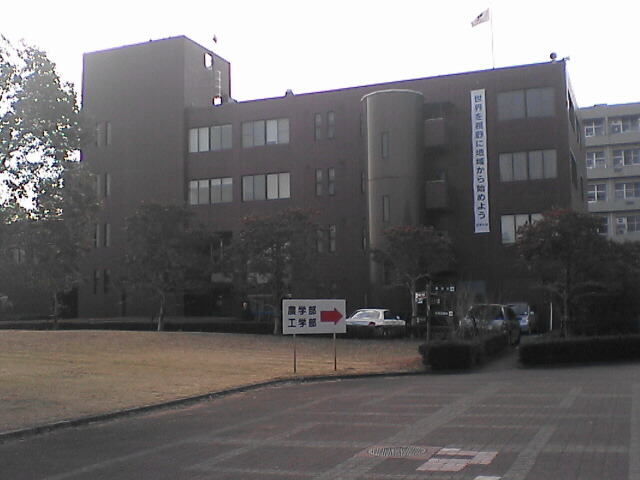
- Type: National
- Established: 2003
- President: Tsuyomu Ikenoue
- Location: Miyazaki, Miyazaki, Japan
- Website: Official website

University of Miyazaki (宮崎大学, Miyazaki Daigaku) is a national university primarily in the Kibana neighborhood of southern Miyazaki city, Miyazaki Prefecture, Japan. The name is sometimes shortened to the abbreviation "UoM" or the portmanteau "Miyadai." The predecessor of the school was founded in 1884, and it was chartered as a university in 2003. The university has undergraduate faculties in education and culture, regional innovation, medicine, engineering, and agriculture. The university also has graduate programs in agriculture, education, engineering, and medicine (inc. veterinary medicine).

The Center for International Relations provides several English-language guides directed at international students.

== Faculties ==
Faculty (a.k.a., College, School)	Graduate Schools	Departments
Faculty of Agriculture	Graduate School of Agriculture; Interdisciplinary Graduate School of Agriculture and Engineering; Interdisciplinary Graduate School of Medicine and Veterinary Medicine; Animal Sciences Special Course	Agricultural and Environmental Sciences; Forest and Environmental Sciences; Biochemistry and Applied Biosciences; Marine Biology and Environmental Sciences; Animal and Grassland Sciences; Veterinary Sciences
Faculty of Education	Graduate School of Education	N/A
Faculty of Engineering	Graduate School of Engineering; Interdisciplinary Graduate School of Agriculture and Engineering	Applied Chemistry; Civil and Environmental Engineering; Environmental Robotics; Mechanical Design Systems Engineering; Applied Physics and Electronic Engineering; Electrical and Systems Engineering; Computer Science and Systems Engineering
Faculty of Medicine	Graduate School of Nursing Science; Interdisciplinary Graduate School of Medicine and Veterinary Medicine	Urology; Surgery; Dermatology; Ophthalmology; Internal Medicine 2 Internal Medicine 3 Rheumatology and Infectious Diseases; Psychiatry; Pediatrics; Orthopaedics; Otorhinolaryngology; Obstetrics and Gynecology; Radiology; Anesthesiology; Neurosurgery; Oral and Maxillofacial Surgery / Orthodontics; Emergency and Critical Care Center; Medical Information Technology; Pharmacy; Nursing
Faculty of Regional Innovation	N/A	N/A

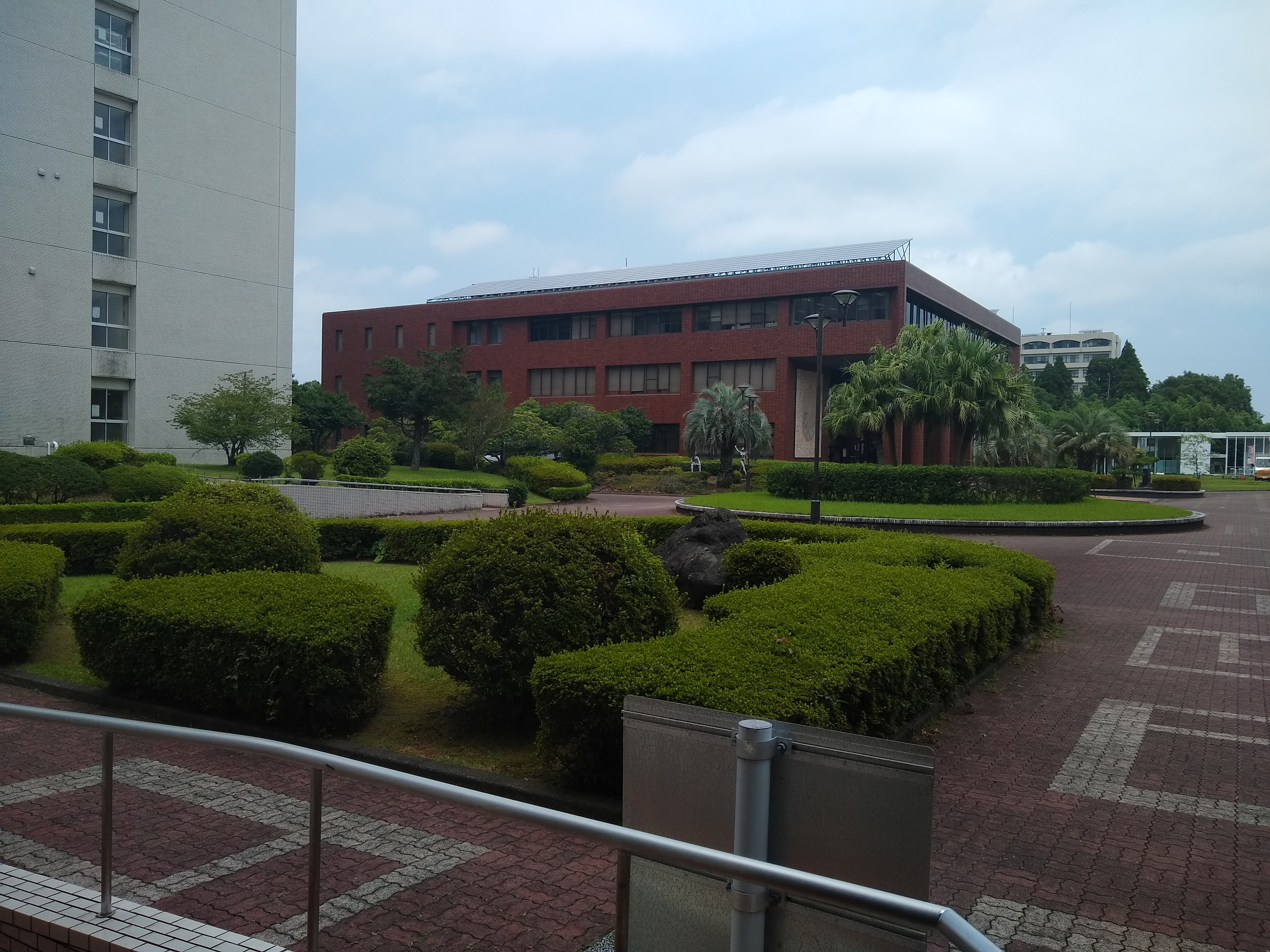

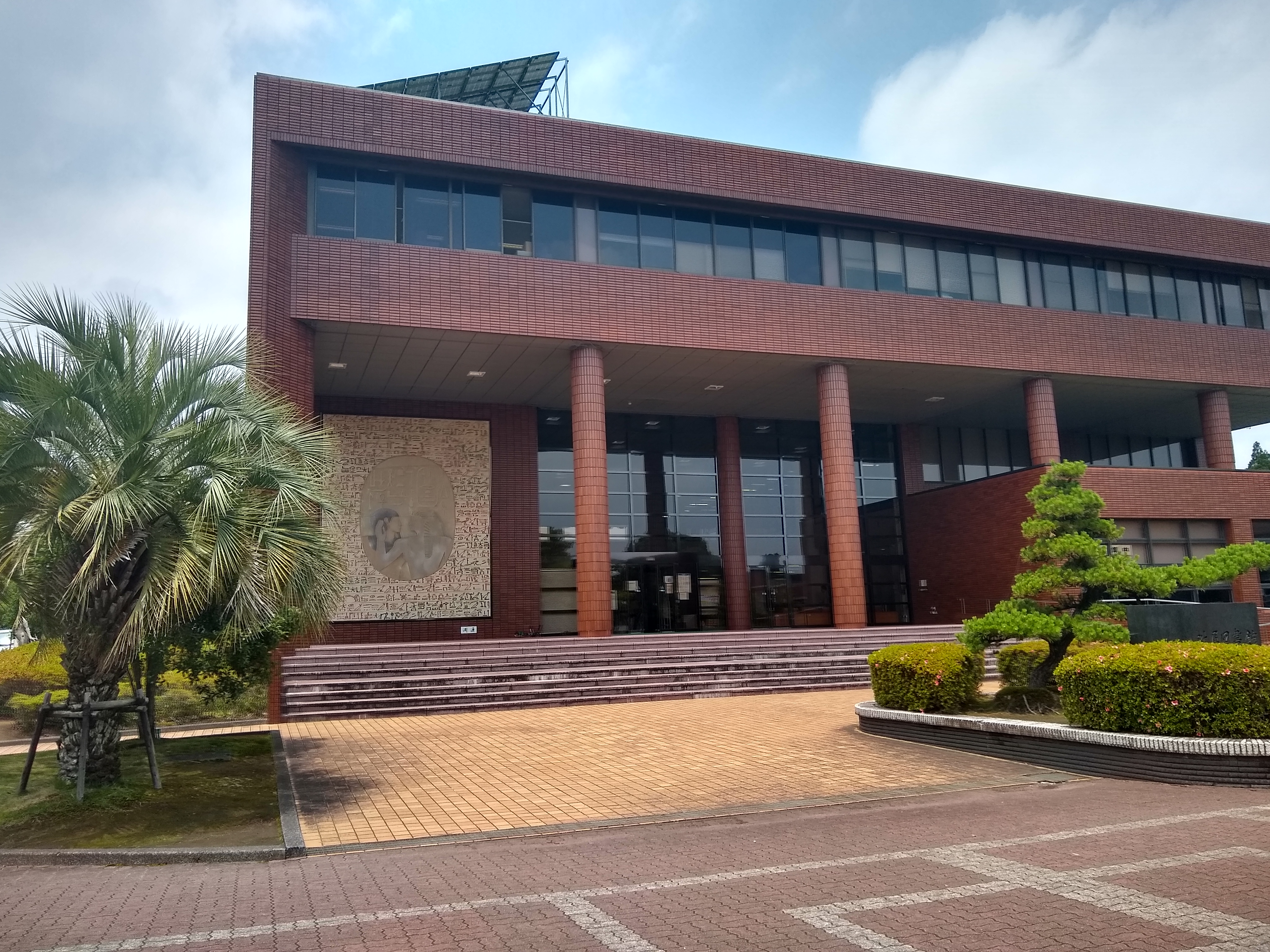

== Transportation ==
=== Bicycles ===
The University of Miyazaki offers multiple bicycle parking areas around the Kibana campus. Some areas are covered and some are not. Bicycles are not allowed in the central part of campus, only the periphery where cars also have access.

=== Cars, Motorcycles, and Mopeds ===
Automobiles are another popular form of transportation to the University of Miyazaki, and there are several parking lots positioned around the Kibana campus.

=== Walking ===
There are pedestrian paths (including sidewalks) leading in and out of the Kibana campus at multiple locations.

=== Public Transportation ===
The closest train station is Kibana Station (Kibana Eki). There is a bus stop on campus.
