= Miyazaki Airport Station =

Railway station in Miyazaki, Miyazaki Prefecture, Japan

Miyazaki Airport Station 宮崎空港駅
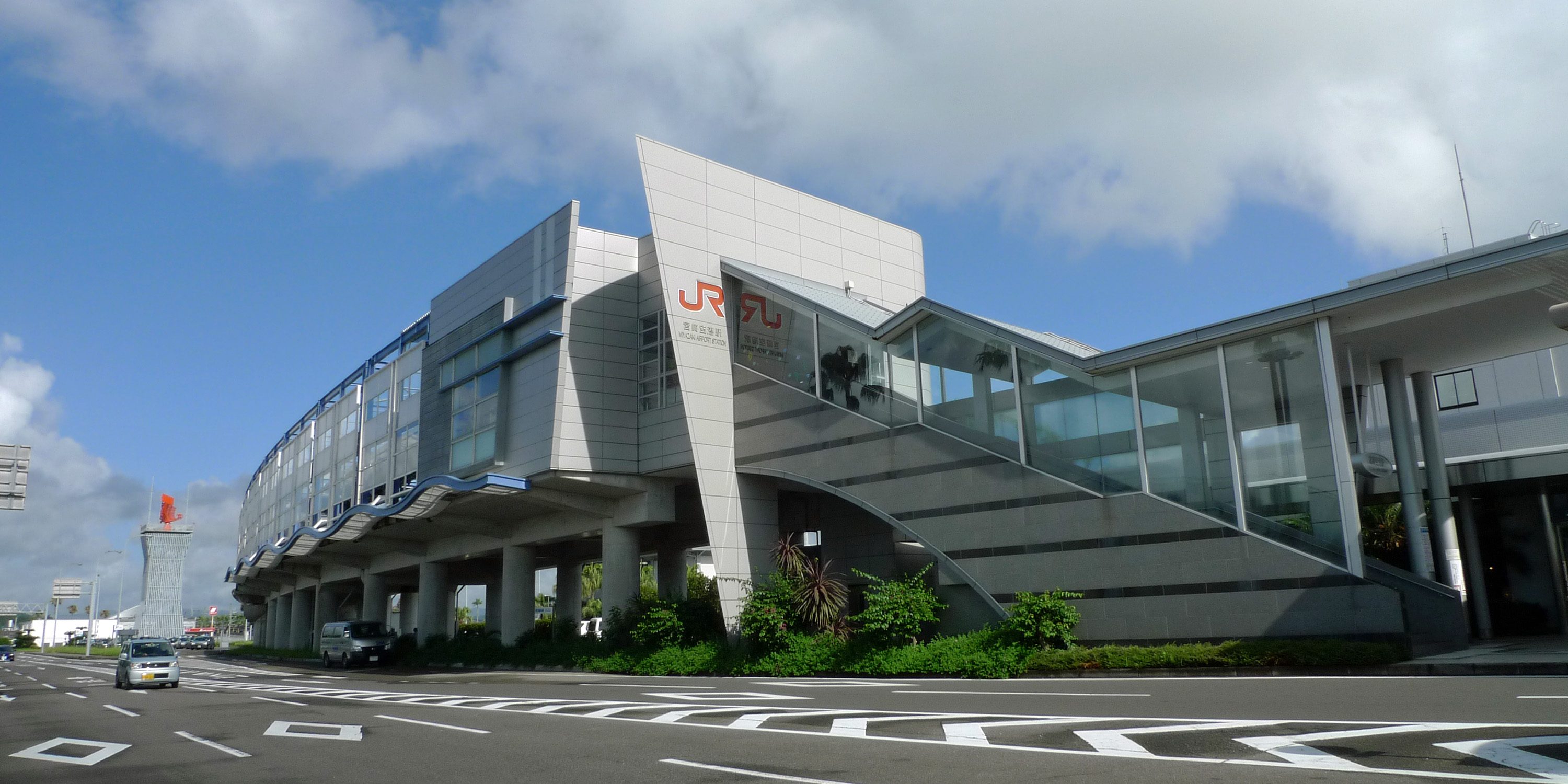
- Miyazaki Airport Station building

General information
- Location: 242 Akae, Miyazaki-shi, Miyazaki-ken 880-0912; Japan
- Coordinates: 31°52′21″N 131°26′22″E
- Operator: JR Kyushu
- Line: ■Miyazaki Kūkō Line
- Distance: 1.4 km from Tayoshi
- Platforms: 1 island platform
- Tracks: 2
- Connections: Bus terminal

Construction
- Accessible: yes

Other information
- Status: Staffed (Midori no Madoguchi)
- Website: Official website

History
- Opened: 18 July 1996

Passengers
- FY2016: 864

Services
Preceding station	JR Kyushu	Following station
Tayoshi Terminus	Miyazaki Kūkō Line	Terminus
Location
- Location within Miyazaki Prefecture Location within Japan

Miyazaki Airport Station (宮崎空港駅, Miyazaki-kūkō-eki) is a passenger railway station located in Miyazaki City, Miyazaki Prefecture, Japan. It is operated by JR Kyushu and is on the Nippō Main Line.

== Lines ==
The station is the terminus of the Miyazaki Kūkō Line and is located 1.4 km from the opposing terminus of the line at Tayoshi.

== Layout ==
The station consists of one elevated island platform and two tracks, and the platform is slightly curved. In front of the exit the station building is the entrance to the Miyazaki Airport Passenger Terminal Building and the bus terminal.

Management of the passenger facilities at the station has been outsourced to the JR Kyushu Tetsudou Eigyou Co., a wholly owned subsidiary of JR Kyushu specialising in station services. It mans the Midori no Madoguchi staffed ticket office.

=== Platforms ===
1, 2	■ ■Miyazaki Kūkō Line	for Minami-Miyazaki, Miyazaki and Nobeoka

== History ==
The station was opened on 18 July 1996.

== Passenger statistics ==
In fiscal 2016, the station was used by an average of 864 passengers daily (boarding passengers only), and it ranked 183rd among the busiest stations of JR Kyushu.

== Surrounding area ==
- Miyazaki Airport
- Miyazaki East Hospital

== See also ==
- Miyazaki Airport
- List of railway stations in Japan
- Airport rail link
