= Ibii Station =

Railway station in Nichinan, Miyazaki Prefecture, Japan

Ibii Station 伊比井駅
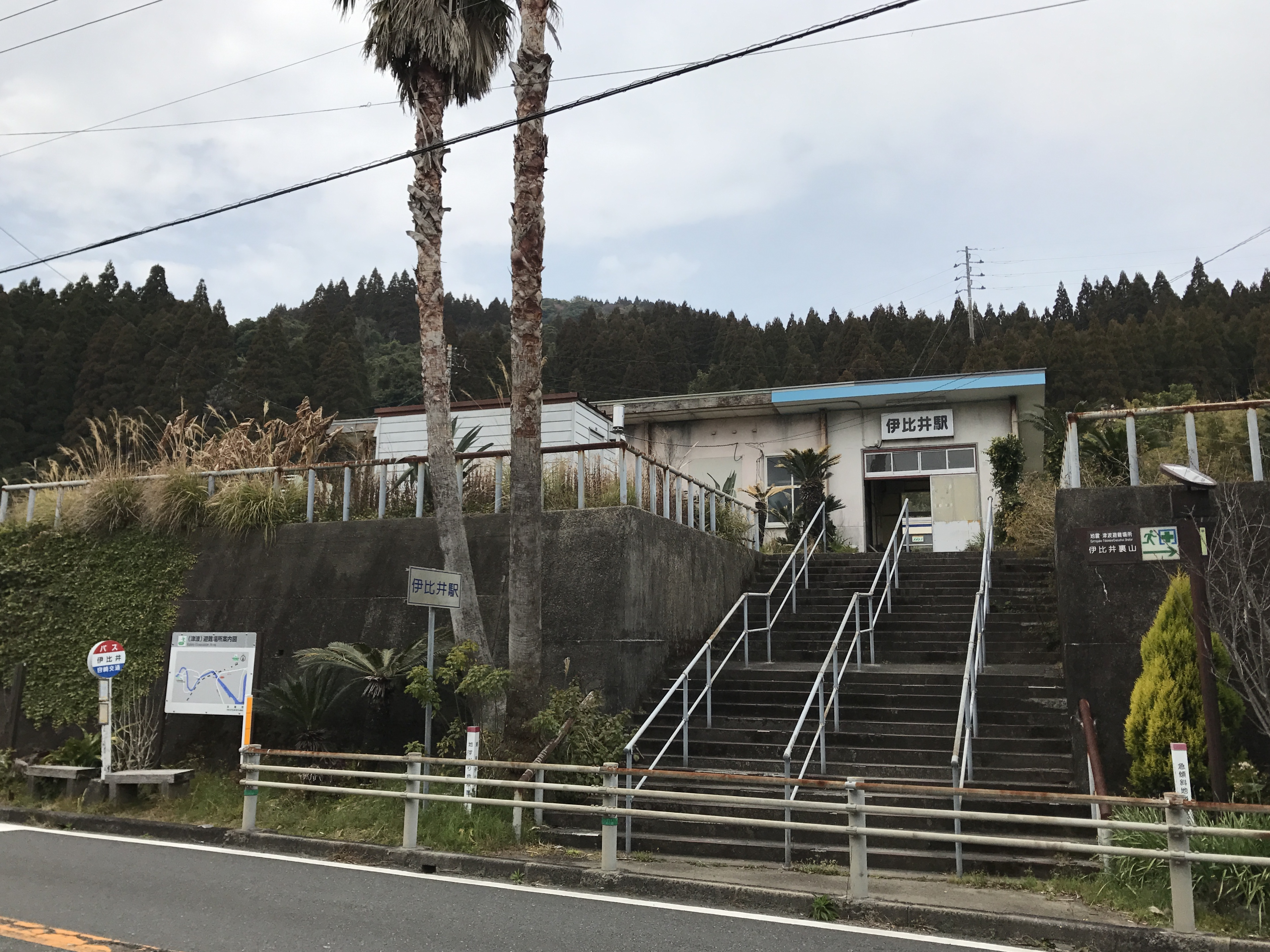
- Ibii Station in 2017

General information
- Location: Ibii, Nichinan-shi, Miyazaki-ken 887-0111; Japan
- Coordinates: 31°42′40″N 131°27′22″E
- Operator: JR Kyushu
- Line: ■ Nichinan Line
- Distance: 23.3 km from Minami-Miyazaki
- Platforms: 1 island platform
- Tracks: 2
- Connections: Bus stop

Construction
- Structure type: Sidehill cutting
- Accessible: No - steps lead up to platform

Other information
- Status: Unstaffed
- Website: Official website

History
- Opened: 8 May 1963

Passengers
- FY2016: 14 daily

Services
Preceding station	JR Kyushu	Following station
Kouchiumi towards Minami-Miyazaki	Nichinan Line	Kitagō towards Shibushi
Location
- Location within Miyazaki Prefecture Location within Japan

Ibii Station (伊比井駅, Ibii-eki) is a passenger railway station located in the city of Nichinan, Miyazaki Prefecture, Japan. It is operated by JR Kyushu and is on the Nichinan Line.

== Lines ==
The station is served by the Nichinan Line and is located 23.3 km from the starting point of the line at Minami-Miyazaki.

== Layout ==
The station consists of an island platform serving two tracks on a sidehill cutting grade. The station building is a functional concrete structure of modern design which is unstaffed and serves only as a waiting room. Access to the island platform is by means of a level crossing. From the access road, a flight of steps leads up the cutting to the station building. There is no station forecourt and no parking available at the foot of steps.

=== Platforms ===
East (Station side)	■ ■ Nichinan Line	for Aburatsu and Shibushi
West	■ ■ Nichinan Line	for Miyazaki and Minami-Miyazaki

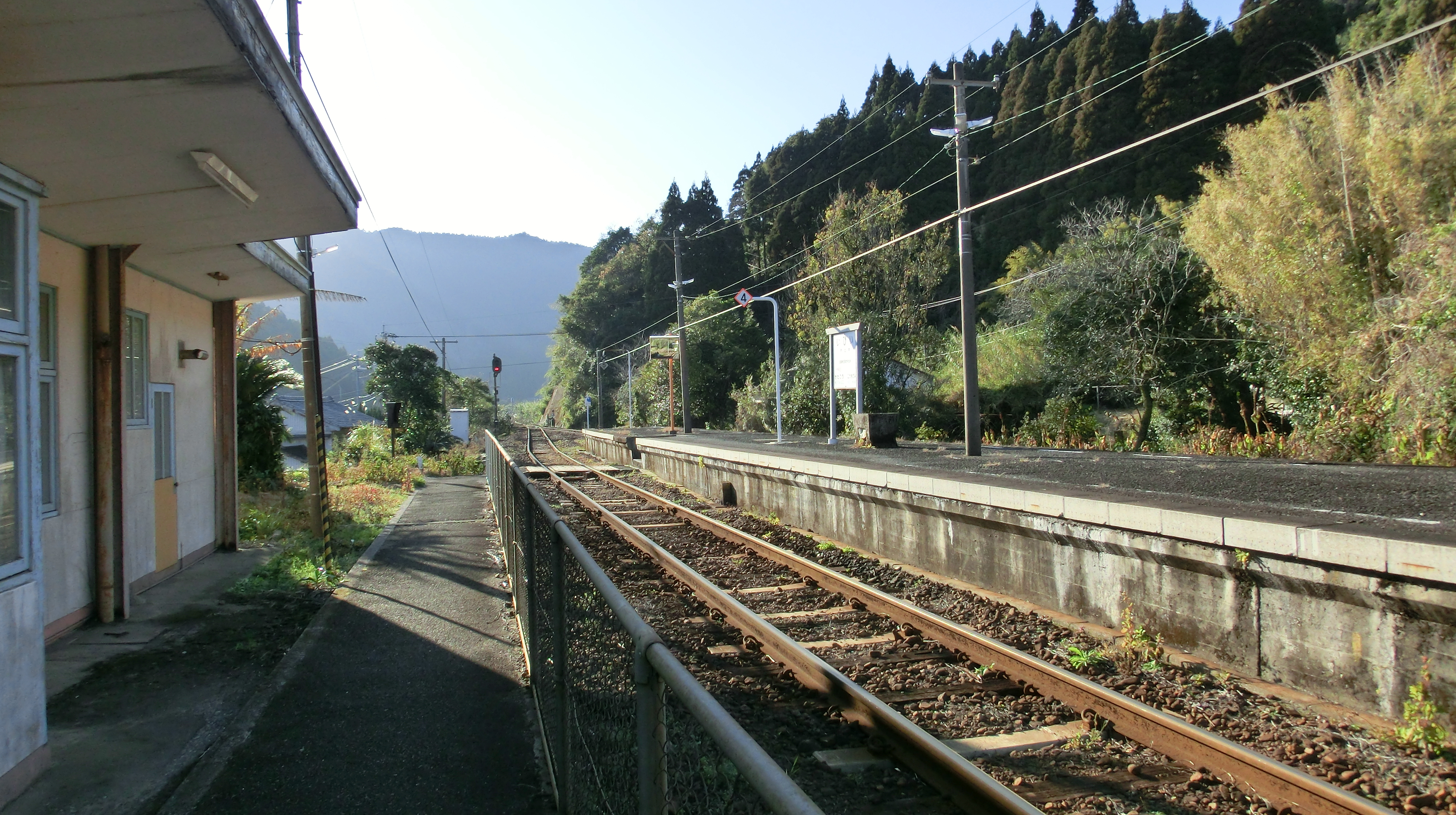
A view of the platform and tracks. Note the level crossing from the station building to the platform.

== History ==
The private Miyazaki Light Railway (宮崎軽便鉄道) (later renamed the Miyazaki Railway) opened a line on 31 October 1913 between Minami-Miyazaki and Uchiumi (a station of the same name but at a different location from this present one). The line and its stations closed when the Miyazaki Railway ceased operations on 1 July 1962. Subsequently, Japanese National Railways (JNR) extended its then Shibushi Line north from Kitagō towards Minami-Miyazaki using largely the same route. The linkup, which included the reopening of several previously closed stations, was completed on 8 May 1963, and inc whereupon the route was renamed the Nichinan Line. Ibii was one of several new intermediate stations which were also opened on the same day. With the privatization of JNR on 1 April 1987, the station came under the control of JR Kyushu.

== Passenger statistics ==
In fiscal 2016, the station was used by an average of 14 passengers (boarding only) per day.

== Surrounding area ==
- Udo Jingū

== See also ==
- List of railway stations in Japan
