= Tayoshi Station =

Railway station in Miyazaki, Miyazaki Prefecture, Japan

Tayoshi Station 田吉駅
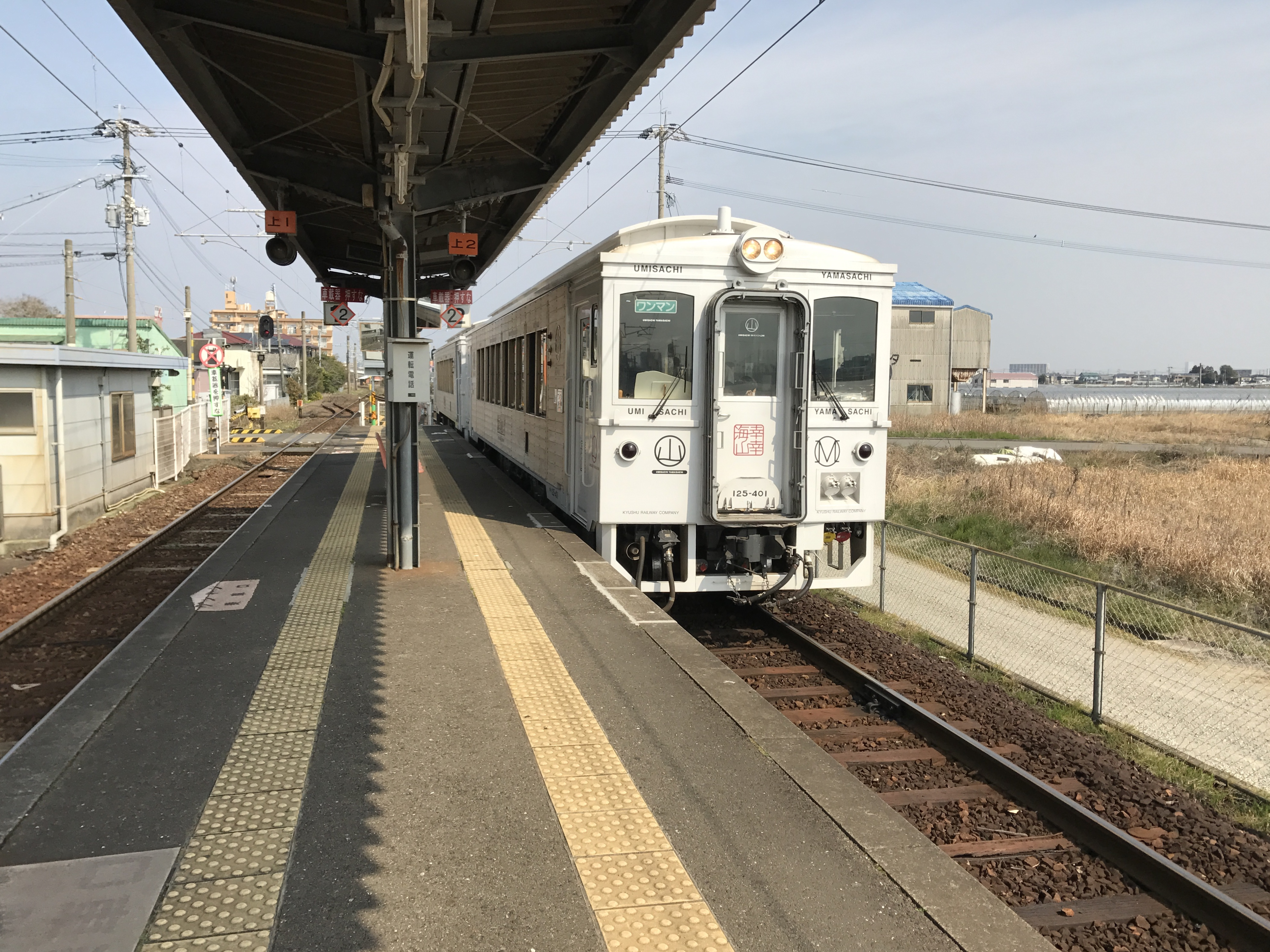
- Tayoshi Station in 2017

General information
- Location: Tayoshi, Miyazaki-shi, Miyazki-ken 880-0911; Japan
- Coordinates: 31°52′45″N 131°25′49″E
- Operator: JR Kyushu
- Lines: ■ Nichinan Line; ■Miyazaki Kūkō Line
- Distance: 2.0 km from Minami-Miyazaki (Nichinan Line); 0.0 km (start of the Miyazaki Kūkō Line)
- Platforms: 1 island platform
- Tracks: 2

Construction
- Structure type: At grade
- Accessible: No - level crossing to platform has steps

Other information
- Status: Unstaffed
- Website: Official website

History
- Opened: 31 October 1913

Passengers
- FY2016: 37 daily

Services
Preceding station	JR Kyushu	Following station
Minami-Miyazaki Terminus	Nichinan Line	Minamikata towards Shibushi
Terminus	Miyazaki Kūkō Line	Miyazaki Airport Terminus
Location
- Location within Miyazaki Prefecture Location within Japan

Tayoshi Station (田吉駅, Tayoshi-eki) is a passenger railway station located in the city of Miyazaki City, Miyazaki Prefecture, Japan. It is operated by JR Kyushu and is the junction between the Nichinan Line and the Miyazaki Kūkō Line.

== Lines ==
Tayoshi Station is the official starting point of the 1.4 kilometer Miyazaki Kūkō Line and is also served by the Nichinan Line whose starting point is 2 km (1.2 mi) to the north at Minami-Miyazaki.

== Layout ==
The station, which is unstaffed, consists of an island platform serving two tracks set in a largely rural area with a view of the nearby Miyazaki Airport beyond some fields. There is no station building. A small shed beside the tracks on the access path serves as a waiting room. Access to the island platform from the path is by means of a level crossing with steps at the platform end.

=== Platforms ===
1	■ ■ Nichinan Line	for Minami-Miyazaki and Miyazaki
2	■ ■Miyazaki Kūkō Line	for Miyazaki Airport
2	■ ■ Nichinan Line	for Aburatsu and Shibushi

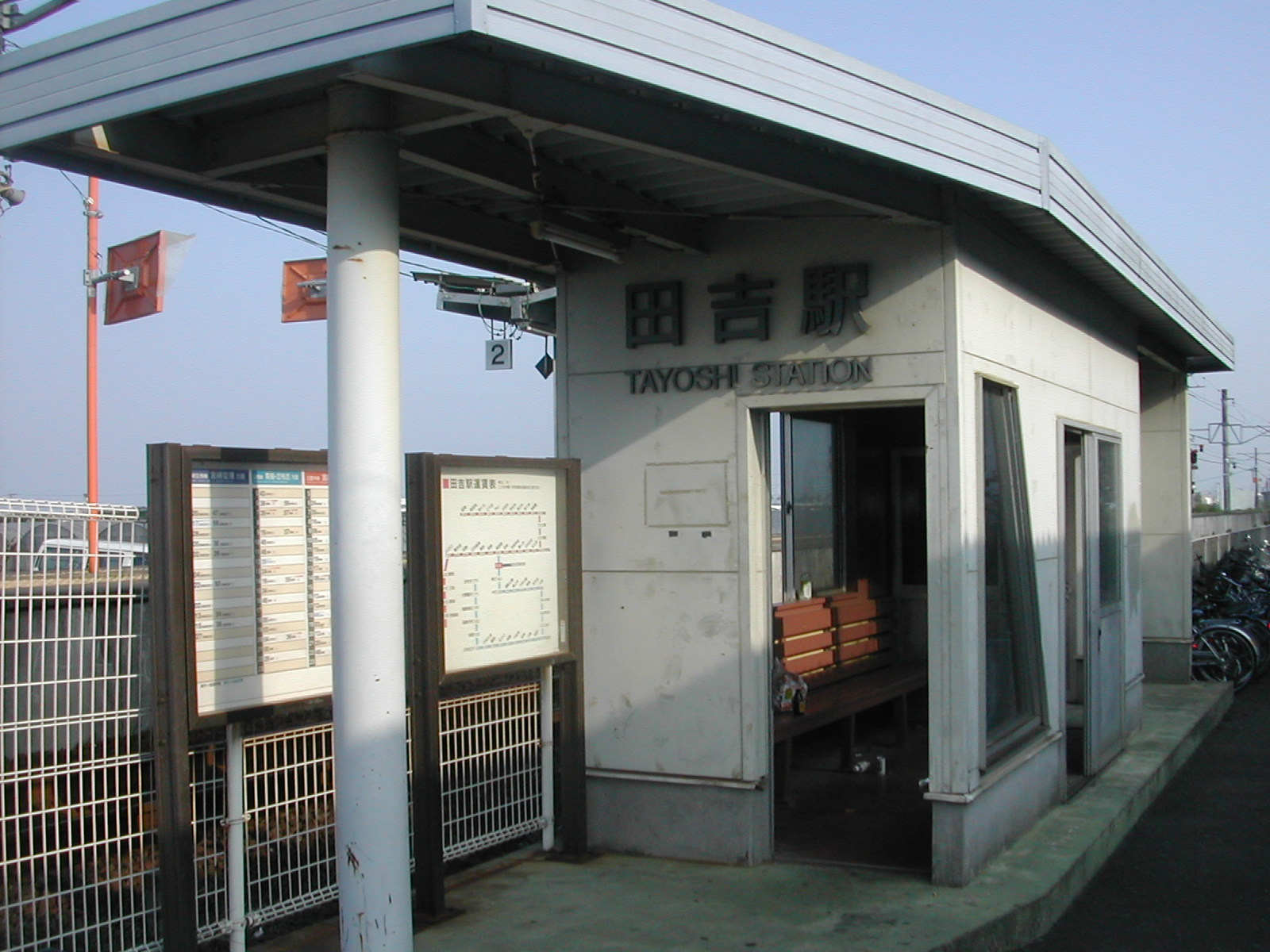
The waiting room of the station.

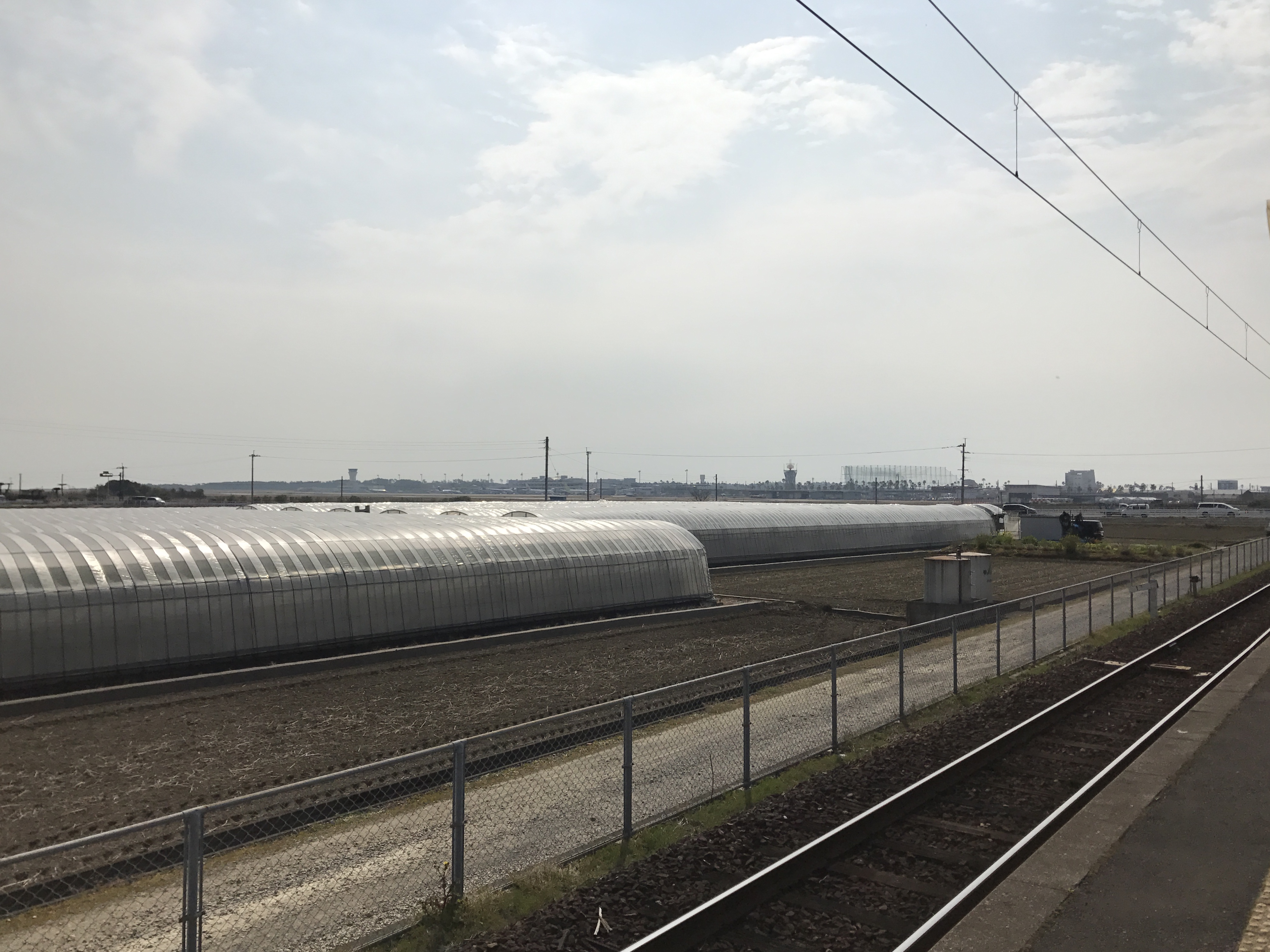
A view of Miyazaki Airport from the station platform.

== History ==
The private Miyazaki Light Railway (宮崎軽便鉄道) (later renamed the Miyazaki Railway) opened the station on 31 October 1913 as an intermediate station on a line it had laid between Minami-Miyazaki and Uchiumi (now closed). The station closed when the Miyazaki Railway ceased operations on 1 July 1962. Subsequently, Japanese National Railways (JNR) extended its then Shibushi Line north from Kitagō towards Minami-Miyazaki on the same route and reopened Tayoshi as an intermediate station on 8 May 1963 but closed it on 1 October 1971. In 1996 JR Kyushu built a branch line from this location to Miyazaki Airport and reopened the station on 18 July 1996 as the starting point of the Miyazaki Kūkō Line.

== Passenger statistics ==
In fiscal 2016, the station was used by an average of 37 passengers (boarding only) per day.

== Surrounding area ==
- Miyazaki City Akae Junior High School
- Miyazaki City Hall Akae Regional Center

== See also ==
- List of railway stations in Japan
