= Minamikata Station (Miyazaki) =

Railway station in Miyazaki, Miyazaki Prefecture, Japan

Minamikata Station 南方駅
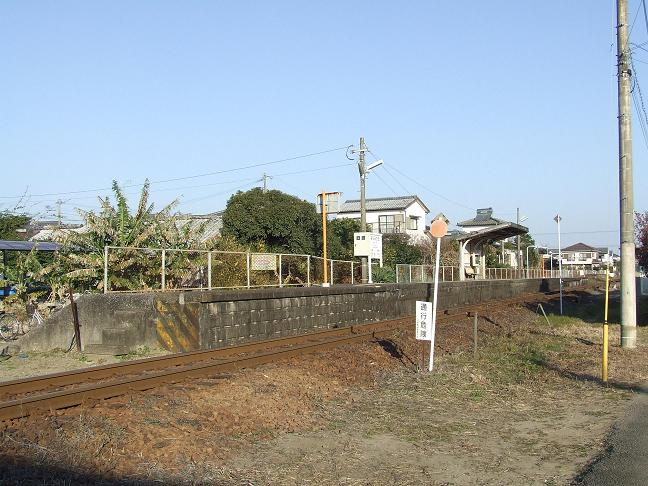
- Minamikata Station in 2010

General information
- Location: Hongominamikata, Miyazaki-shi, Miyazaki-ken 880-0921; Japan
- Coordinates: 31°51′34″N 131°26′04″E
- Operator: JR Kyushu
- Line: ■ Nichinan Line
- Distance: 4.2 km from Minami-Miyazaki
- Platforms: 1 side platform
- Tracks: 1

Construction
- Structure type: At grade

Other information
- Status: Unstaffed
- Website: Official website

History
- Opened: 31 October 1913

Passengers
- FY2016: 89 daily

Services
Preceding station	JR Kyushu	Following station
Tayoshi towards Minami-Miyazaki	Nichinan Line	Kibana towards Shibushi
Location
- Location within Miyazaki Prefecture Location within Japan

Minamikata Station (南方駅, Minamikata-eki) is a passenger railway station located in the city of Miyazaki City, Miyazaki Prefecture, Japan. It is operated by JR Kyushu and is on the Nichinan Line.

== Lines ==
Minamikata Station is served by the Nichinan Line and is located 4.2 km from the starting point of the line at Minami-Miyazaki.

== Layout ==
The station, which is unstaffed, consists of a side platform serving a single track at grade set in a largely residential area. There is no station building, only a shelter on the platform for waiting passengers.

== History ==
The private Miyazaki Light Railway (宮崎軽便鉄道) (later renamed the Miyazaki Railway) opened the station on 31 October 1913 as an intermediate station on a line it had laid between Minami-Miyazaki and Uchiumi (now closed). The station closed when the Miyazaki Railway ceased operations on 1 July 1962. Subsequently, Japanese National Railways (JNR) extended its then Shibushi Line north from Kitagō towards Minami-Miyazaki on the same route and reopened Minamikata as an intermediate station on 8 May 1963. With the privatization of JNR on 1 April 1987, the station came under the control of JR Kyushu.

== Passenger statistics ==
In fiscal 2016, the station was used by an average of 89 passengers (boarding only) per day.

== Surrounding area ==
- Miyazaki City Kunitomi Elementary School
- Miyazaki City Hongo Elementary School
- Miyazaki City Hongo Junior High School

== See also ==
- List of railway stations in Japan
