= Aoshima, Miyazaki =

Island in Japan

Coordinates: 31.805044°N 131.475663°E

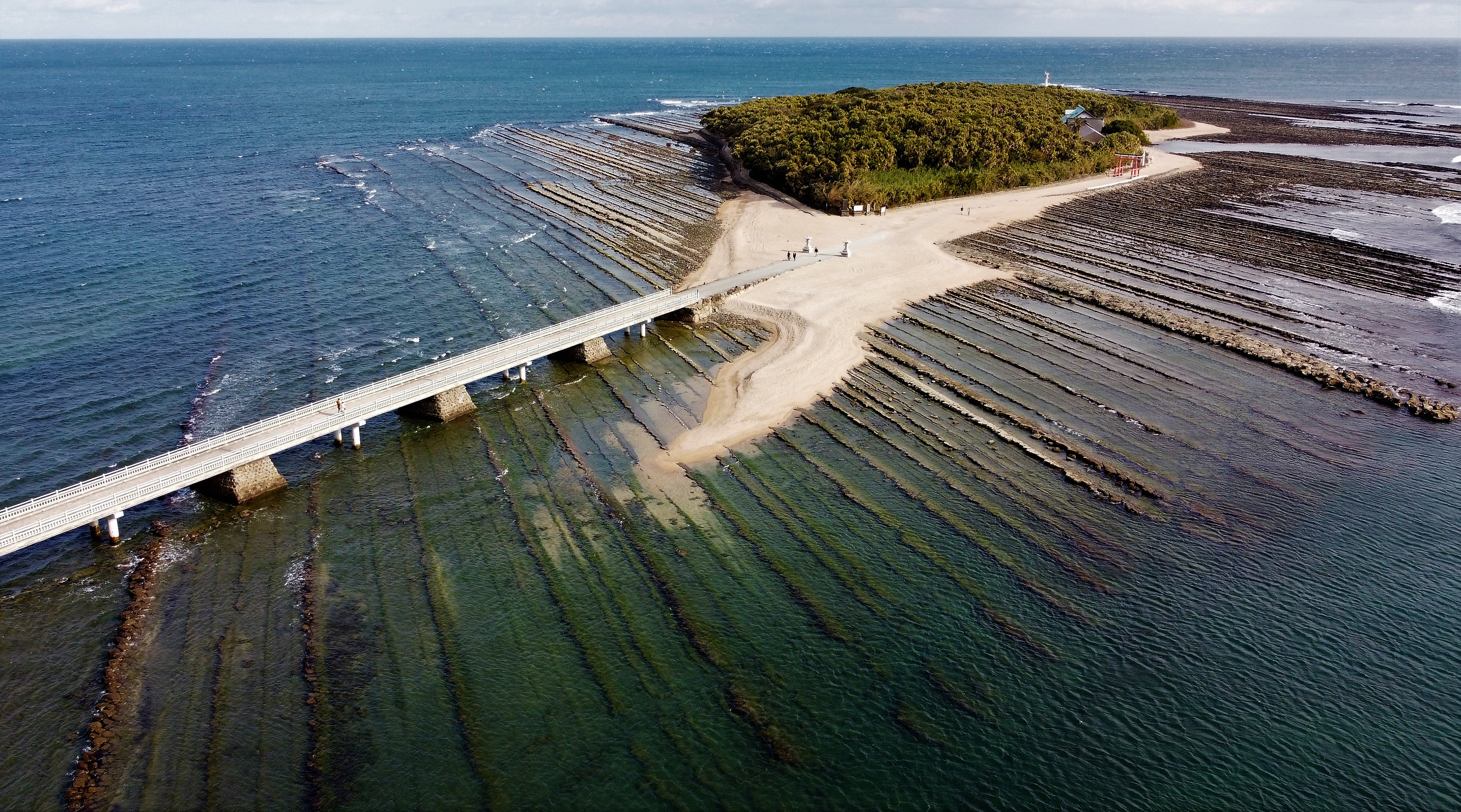
An aerial image of Aoshima

Aoshima (青島, Aoshima) is an island located in Miyazaki, Miyazaki Prefecture, Japan. The island has a surface area of 4.4 hectares (10.9 acres) and a height of 6 metres (20 feet). The island is part of the Aoshima Shrine. Miyazaki′s Aoshima neigbbourhood consists of the island and the opposite coastal strip, where the Aoshima Subtropical Botanical Garden is located.

== Geology ==
The island is surrounded by unique rock formations referred to as the Ogre's Washboard (鬼の洗濯板, Oni no Sentakuita), consisting of alternating layers of mud- and sandstone. These layers were originally desposited at the bottom of the ocean by turbidity currents between 24 and 2 million years ago, similar to flysch. The formation has since been uplifted and exposed at an angle by tectonic activity, where the softer mudstone erodes faster than the sanstone, creating the characteristic washboard pattern.

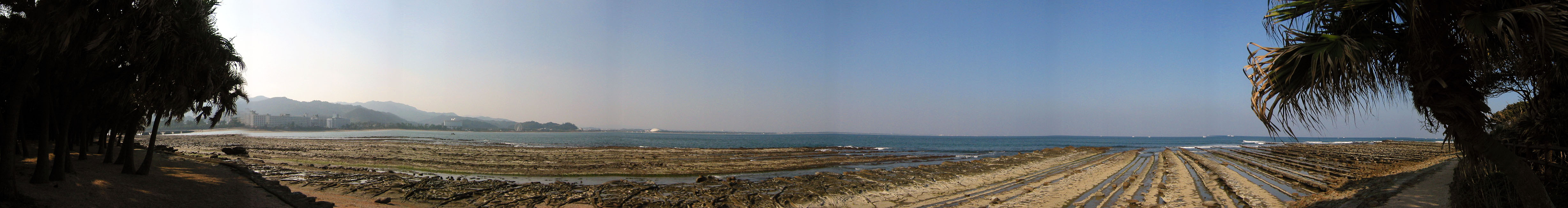
A panorama of the 'Ogre's Washboard'.

== Flora ==
The island is covered with the world's northernmost self-reproducing population of the fan palm, Livistona chinensis (Arecaceae), and is one of two places in Japan with a virgin forest of this indigenous species.

== Climate ==
Aoshima has a humid subtropical climate (Köppen climate classification Cfa) with hot summers and mild winters. Precipitation is significant throughout the year, and is heavier in summer, especially the months of June and July. The average annual temperature in Aoshima is 17.6 °C (63.7 °F). The average annual rainfall is 2,857.4 mm (112.50 in) with June as the wettest month. The temperatures are highest on average in August, at around 27.0 °C (80.6 °F), and lowest in January, at around 8.1 °C (46.6 °F). The highest temperature ever recorded in Aoshima was 37.8 °C (100.0 °F) on 1 August 2013; the coldest temperature ever recorded was −4.8 °C (23.4 °F) on 27 February 1981.

Climate data for Aoshima (1981−2010 normals, extremes 1977−2017)
| Month | Jan | Feb | Mar | Apr | May | Jun | Jul | Aug | Sep | Oct | Nov | Dec | Year |
|---|---|---|---|---|---|---|---|---|---|---|---|---|---|
| Record high °C (°F) | 24.4 (75.9) | 24.4 (75.9) | 27.5 (81.5) | 31.6 (88.9) | 34.8 (94.6) | 34.9 (94.8) | 37.1 (98.8) | 37.8 (100.0) | 36.7 (98.1) | 32.0 (89.6) | 29.6 (85.3) | 24.3 (75.7) | 37.8 (100.0) |
| Mean maximum °C (°F) | 19.3 (66.7) | 21.2 (70.2) | 22.8 (73.0) | 26.5 (79.7) | 29.5 (85.1) | 32.8 (91.0) | 34.9 (94.8) | 34.2 (93.6) | 32.6 (90.7) | 28.2 (82.8) | 24.7 (76.5) | 20.6 (69.1) | 35.4 (95.7) |
| Mean daily maximum °C (°F) | 12.2 (54.0) | 13.2 (55.8) | 15.9 (60.6) | 20.2 (68.4) | 23.5 (74.3) | 26.1 (79.0) | 30.4 (86.7) | 30.4 (86.7) | 27.5 (81.5) | 23.3 (73.9) | 18.8 (65.8) | 14.4 (57.9) | 21.3 (70.4) |
| Daily mean °C (°F) | 8.1 (46.6) | 9.2 (48.6) | 12.0 (53.6) | 16.2 (61.2) | 19.8 (67.6) | 22.8 (73.0) | 26.7 (80.1) | 27.0 (80.6) | 24.4 (75.9) | 19.8 (67.6) | 15.0 (59.0) | 10.2 (50.4) | 17.6 (63.7) |
| Mean daily minimum °C (°F) | 4.3 (39.7) | 5.3 (41.5) | 8.2 (46.8) | 12.3 (54.1) | 16.1 (61.0) | 19.8 (67.6) | 23.5 (74.3) | 24.1 (75.4) | 21.5 (70.7) | 16.5 (61.7) | 11.4 (52.5) | 6.3 (43.3) | 14.1 (57.4) |
| Mean minimum °C (°F) | −0.9 (30.4) | −0.1 (31.8) | 1.8 (35.2) | 5.8 (42.4) | 11.5 (52.7) | 15.6 (60.1) | 20.4 (68.7) | 21.5 (70.7) | 16.9 (62.4) | 10.6 (51.1) | 4.9 (40.8) | 0.6 (33.1) | −1.6 (29.1) |
| Record low °C (°F) | −4.3 (24.3) | −4.8 (23.4) | −2.4 (27.7) | 1.9 (35.4) | 7.8 (46.0) | 12.8 (55.0) | 16.8 (62.2) | 18.8 (65.8) | 13.6 (56.5) | 4.5 (40.1) | 0.5 (32.9) | −1.8 (28.8) | −4.8 (23.4) |
| Average precipitation mm (inches) | 80.8 (3.18) | 120.0 (4.72) | 226.3 (8.91) | 256.1 (10.08) | 283.3 (11.15) | 466.9 (18.38) | 276.5 (10.89) | 285.8 (11.25) | 392.5 (15.45) | 257.6 (10.14) | 136.8 (5.39) | 74.8 (2.94) | 2,857.4 (112.50) |
| Average precipitation days (≥ 1.0 mm) | 6.3 | 7.3 | 11.8 | 11.4 | 11.6 | 15.9 | 11.2 | 13.2 | 13.2 | 9.1 | 7.0 | 5.0 | 123 |
| Mean monthly sunshine hours | 161.8 | 150.8 | 160.2 | 167.5 | 154.9 | 160.3 | 174.9 | 190.0 | 148.7 | 158.4 | 144.7 | 160.9 | 1,879 |
Source: Japan Meteorological Agency

== Access ==
The nearest railway station is Aoshima Station, on the Nichinan Line operated by JR Kyushu.

The Ogre's Washboard is visible from the Nichinan Line. Upon approach, the Umisachi Yamasachi sightseeing limited express train slows down to allow passengers to take pictures and for an announcement about the formation.
