= Kodomonokuni Station (Miyazaki) =

Railway station in Japan

Kodomokuni Station 子供の国駅
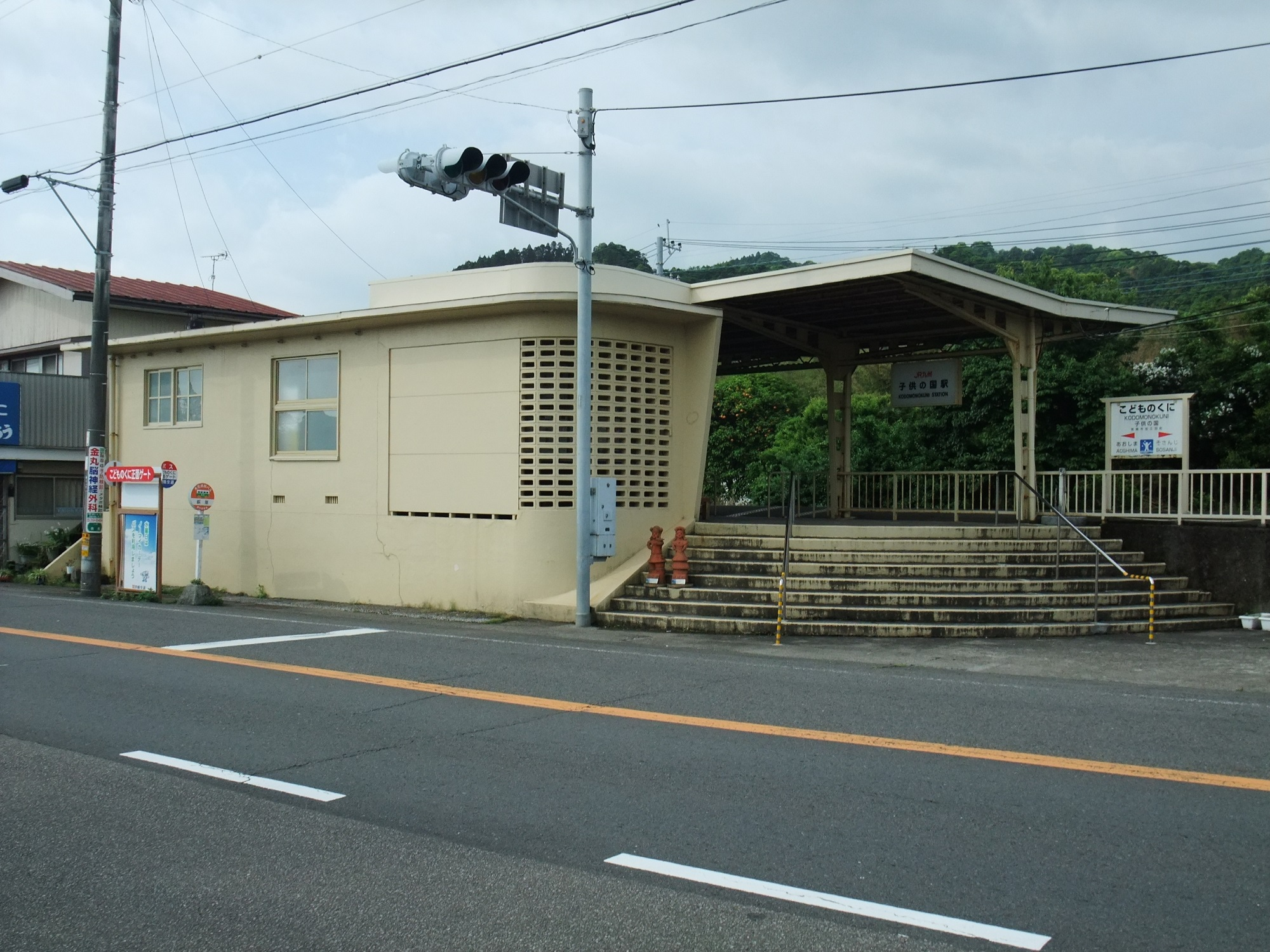
- Kodomonokuni Station in 2014

General information
- Location: Kaeda, Miyazaki-shi, Miyazaki-ken 889-2161; Japan
- Coordinates: 31°48′26″N 131°27′26″E
- Operator: JR Kyushu
- Line: ■ Nichinan Line
- Distance: 11.4 km from Minami-Miyazaki
- Platforms: 1 side platform
- Tracks: 1

Construction
- Structure type: At grade
- Accessible: Yes - ramp to station building

Other information
- Status: Unstaffed
- Website: Official website

History
- Opened: 22 October 1923
- Former names: Aoshima Onsen (to 1939)

Passengers
- FY2016: 39 daily

Services
Preceding station	JR Kyushu	Following station
Sosanji towards Minami-Miyazaki	Nichinan Line	Aoshima towards Shibushi
Location
- Location within Miyazaki Prefecture Location within Japan

Kodomonokuni Station (子供の国駅, Kodomonokuni-eki) is a passenger railway station located in the city of Miyazaki City, Miyazaki Prefecture, Japan. It is operated by JR Kyushu and is on the Nichinan Line.

== Lines ==
The station is served by the Nichinan Line and is located 11.4 km from the starting point of the line at Minami-Miyazaki.

== Layout ==
The station, which is unstaffed, consists of a side platform serving a single track at grade. The station building, a modern concrete structure, is unstaffed and serves only as a waiting room.

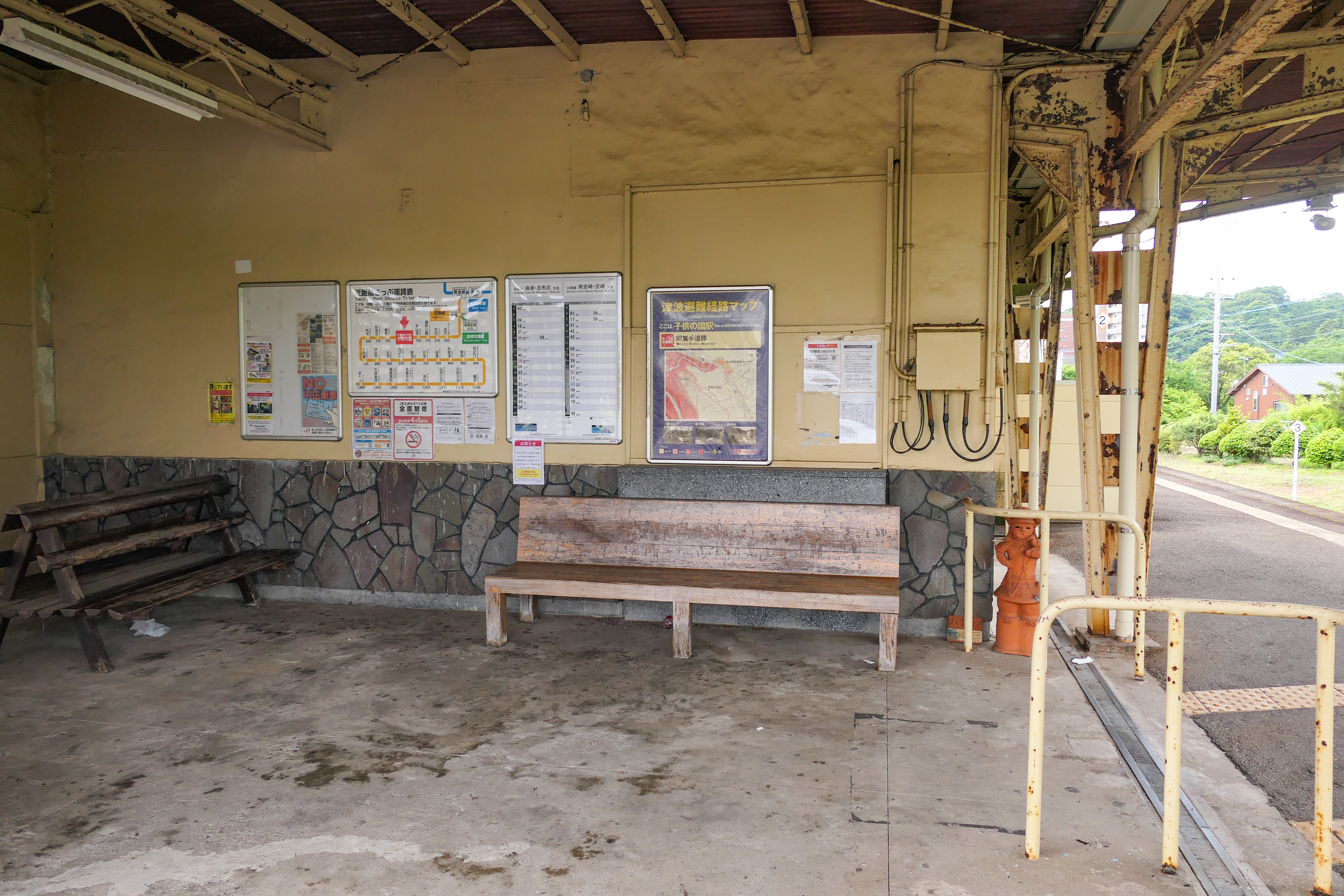
Station building, inside

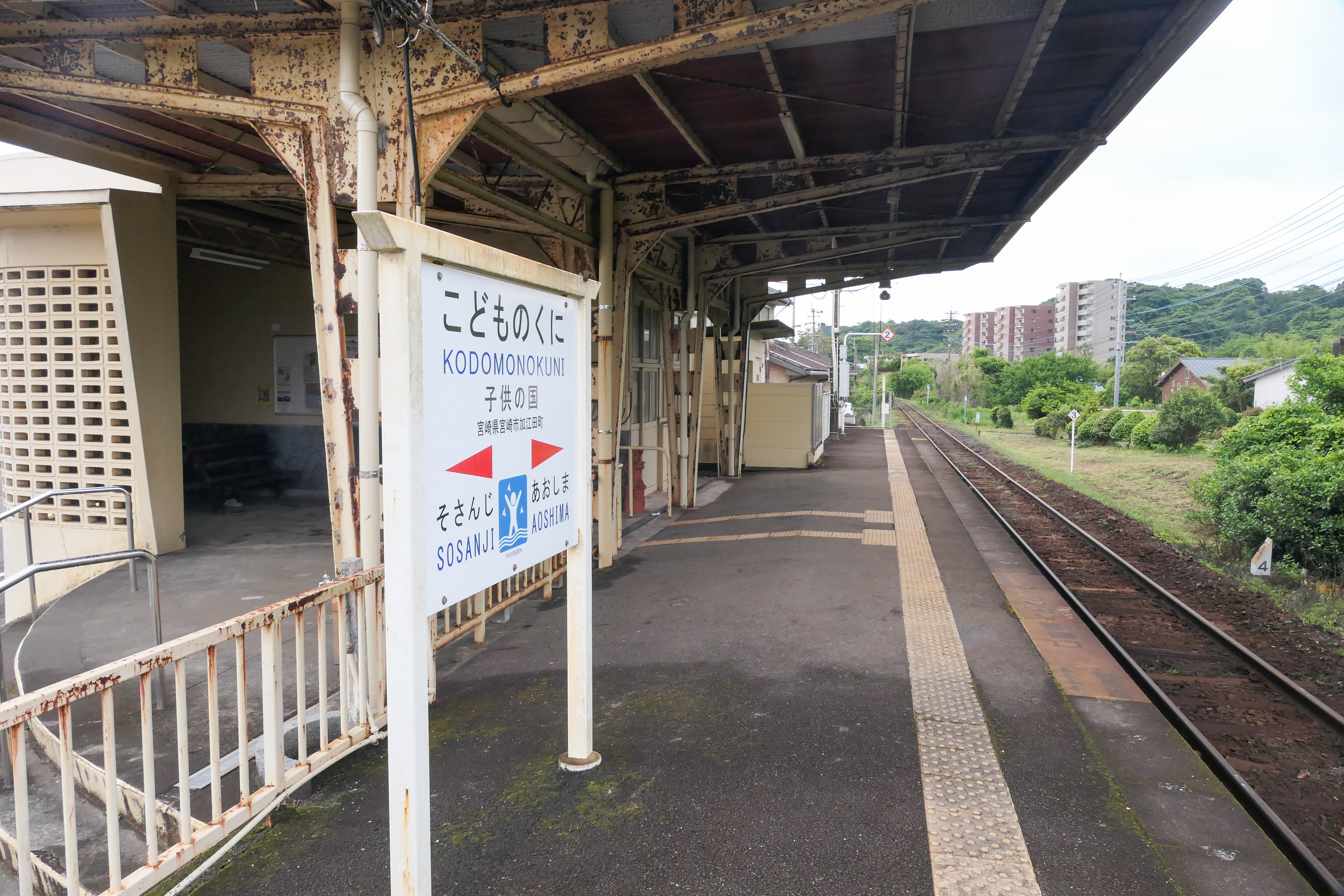
Platform

== History ==
The private Miyazaki Light Railway (宮崎軽便鉄道) (later renamed the Miyazaki Railway) opened the station on 22 October 1923 with the name Aoshima Onsen (青島温泉) as an additional station on a line which it had laid in 1913 between Minami-Miyazaki and Uchiumi (now closed). On 21 March 1939, the station was renamed Kodomonokuni. The station closed when the Miyazaki Railway ceased operations on 1 July 1962. Subsequently, Japanese National Railways (JNR) extended its then Shibushi Line north from Kitagō towards Minami-Miyazaki on the same route and reopened Kodomonokuni as an intermediate station on 8 May 1963. Baggage handling was discontinued in 1971, after which the station became unattended. The route was renamed the Nichinan Line on the same day. With the privatization of JNR on 1 April 1987, the station came under the control of JR Kyushu.

== Passenger statistics ==
In fiscal 2016, the station was used by an average of 39 passengers (boarding only) per day.

== Surrounding area ==
- Kodomonokuni Amusement Park
- Aoshima Onsen

== See also ==
- List of railway stations in Japan
