= Miyazaki Kūkō Line =

Railway line in Miyazaki Prefecture, Japan

Coordinates: 31°52′22″N 131°26′08″E

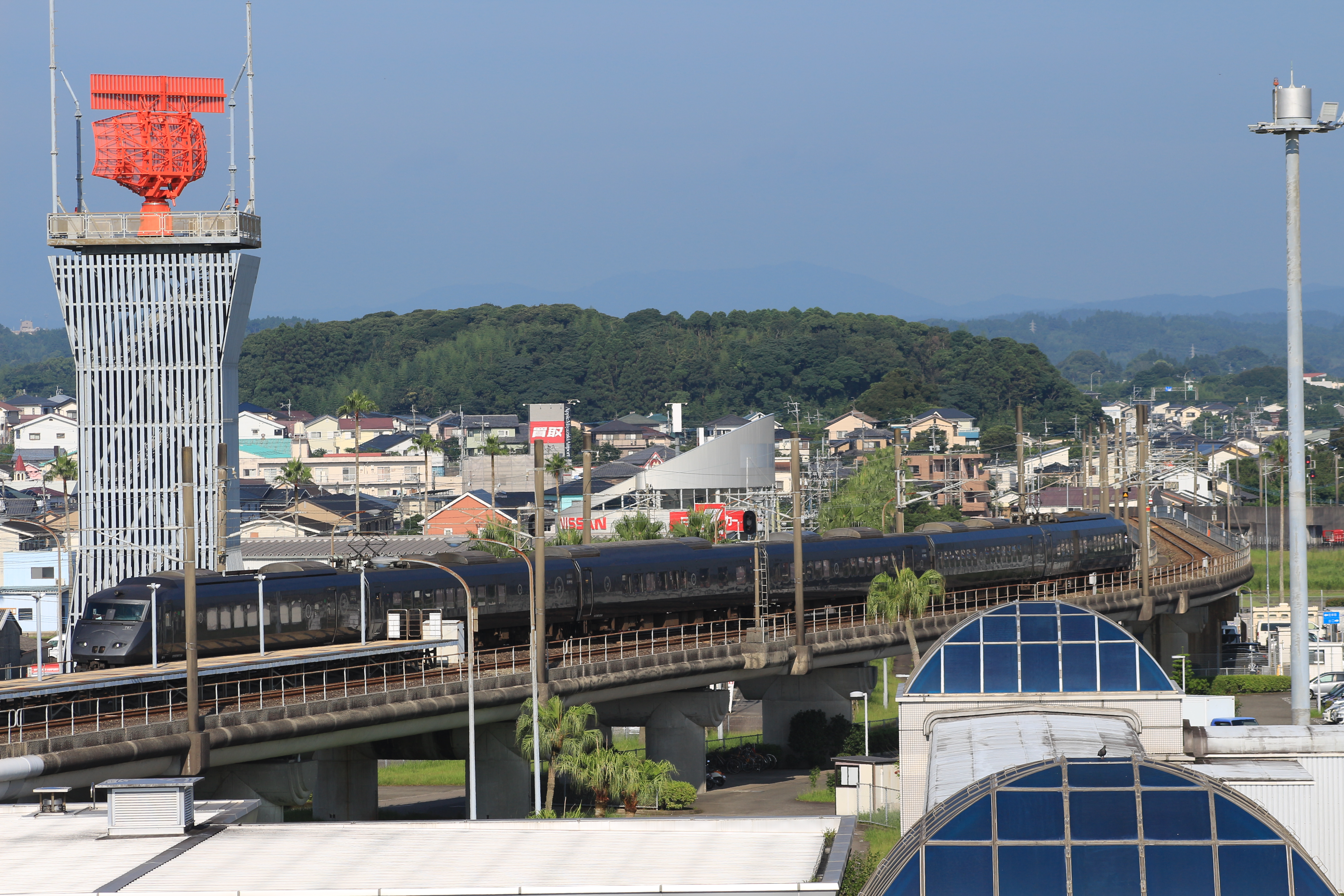
- A 787 series train on the Miyazaki Kūkō Line in 2020

Overview
- Owner: JR Kyushu
- Locale: Miyazaki Prefecture
- Termini: Tayoshi; Miyazaki Airport
- Stations: 2

Service
- Type: Heavy rail

Technical
- Line length: 1.4 km (0.87 mi)
- Number of tracks: Single
- Track gauge: 1,067 mm (3 ft 6 in)
- Electrification: 20 kV AC, overhead catenary

The Miyazaki Kūkō Line (宮崎空港線, Miyazaki Kūkō-sen, "Miyazaki Airport Line") is a railway line in Kyushu, Japan, operated by Kyushu Railway Company (JR Kyushu). It connects Tayoshi Station in Miyazaki, Miyazaki with Miyazaki Airport Station. Trains continue to and from Minami-Miyazaki Station and Miyazaki Station in the city center and further on the Nippō Main Line.

== History ==
The 1.4 km (0.87 mi) line opened on 18 July 1996, 30 years after jet services to the airport commenced.

== Stations ==
Station	Japanese	Distance (km)	Transfers	Location
Tayoshi	田吉	0.0	■ Nichinan Line	Miyazaki, Miyazaki
Miyazaki Airport	宮崎空港	1.4		Miyazaki, Miyazaki
