= Undōkōen Station (Miyazaki) =

Railway station in Miyazaki, Miyazaki Prefecture, Japan

Undōkōen Station 運動公園駅
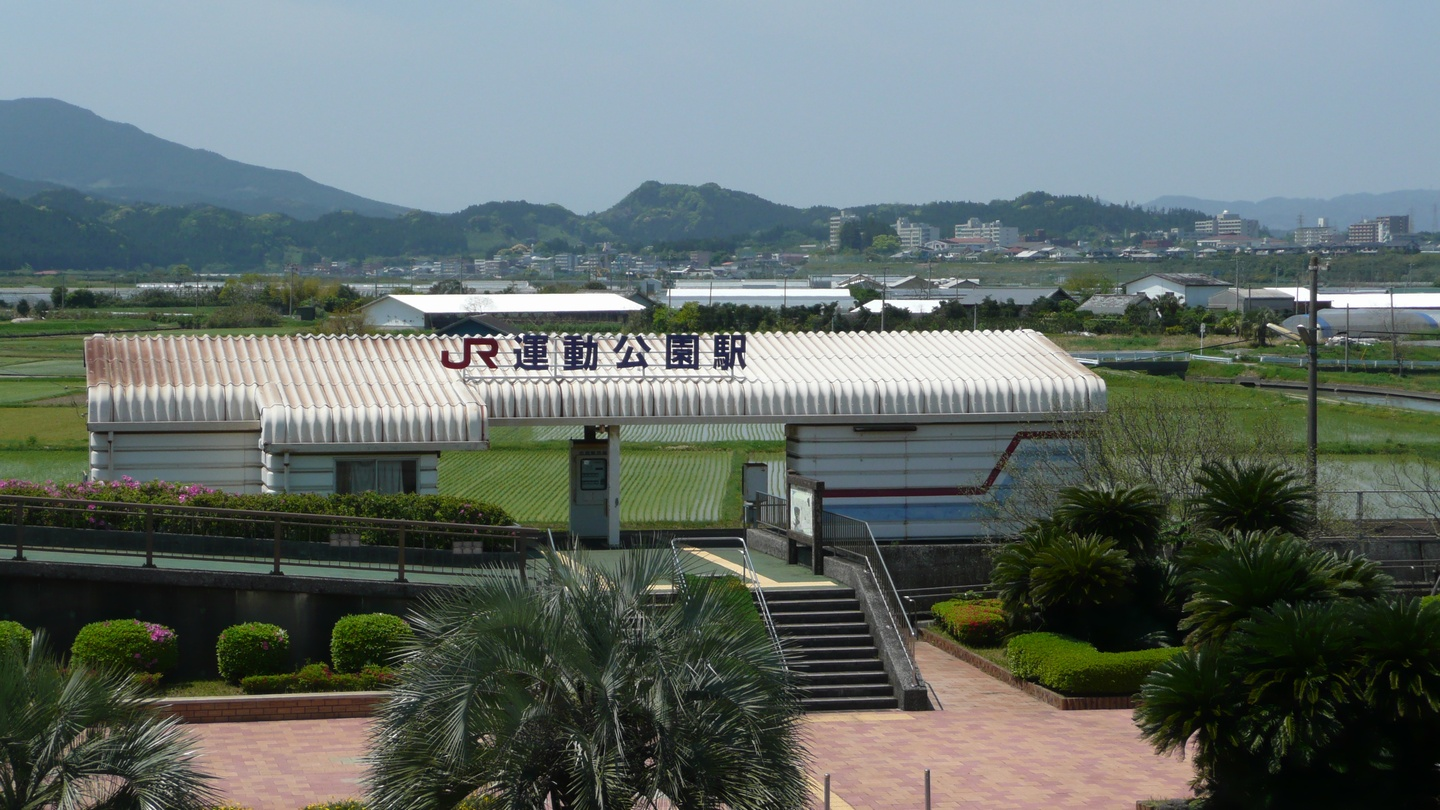
- Undōkōen Station in 2008

General information
- Location: Kumano, Miyazaki-shi, Miyazaki-ken 889-2151; Japan
- Coordinates: 31°49′11″N 131°26′33″E
- Operator: JR Kyushu
- Line: ■ Nichinan Line
- Distance: 9.0 km from Minami-Miyazaki
- Platforms: 1 side platform
- Tracks: 1
- Connections: Bus stop

Construction
- Structure type: At grade
- Accessible: No - steps to station from access road

Other information
- Status: Unstaffed
- Website: Official website

History
- Opened: 18 March 1984

Passengers
- FY2016: 31 daily

Services
Preceding station	JR Kyushu	Following station
Kibana towards Minami-Miyazaki	Nichinan Line	Sosanji towards Shibushi
Location
- Location within Miyazaki Prefecture Location within Japan

Undōkōen Station (運動公園駅, Undōkōen-eki) } is a passenger railway station located in the city of Miyazaki City, Miyazaki Prefecture, Japan. It is operated by JR Kyushu and is on the Nichinan Line.

== Lines ==
The station is served by the Nichinan Line and is located 9.0 km from the starting point of the line at Minami-Miyazaki.

== Layout ==
The station consists of a side platform serving a single track at grade. The station building is a simple open-concept structure that serves mainly as a weather shelter for passengers on the platform. A ticket window has been built but is not staffed. From the station entrance, a pedestrian bridge leads across the main road to the Miyazaki Sports Park, the facility which gives its name to the station.

== History ==
Japanese National Railways (JNR) opened the station on 18 March 1984 as a temporary stop on the existing track of the Nichinan Line. With the privatization of JNR on 1 April 1987, JR Kyushu assumed control of Undōkōen and upgraded it to a full station.

== Passenger statistics ==
In fiscal 2016, the station was used by an average of 31 passengers (boarding only) per day.

== Surrounding area ==
- Miyazaki Prefectural Sports Park
- Sun Marine Stadium

== See also ==
- List of railway stations in Japan
