= Aoshima Shrine =

Shinto shrine in Miyazaki Prefecture, Japan

Aoshima-jinja 青島神社
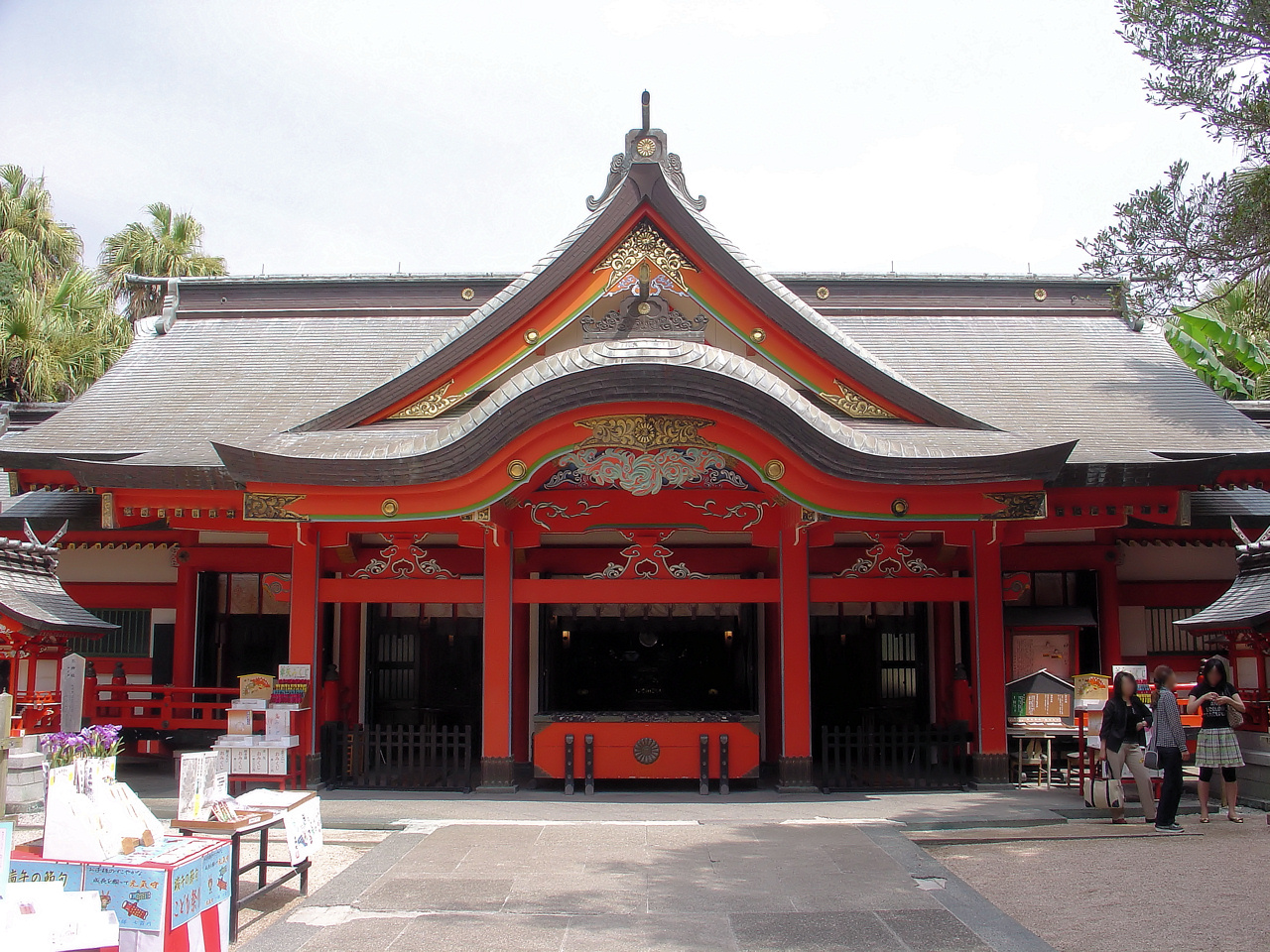

- Location within Japan

Religion
- Affiliation: Shinto
- Deity: Hikohohodemi no Mikoto; Toyotama-hime

Location
- Location: 2-13-1, Aoshima, Miyazaki; Miyazaki Prefecture 889-2162
- Interactive map of Aoshima-jinja 青島神社
- Coordinates: 31°48′17″N 131°28′29″E

Website
- aoshima-jinja.jp

Aoshima Shrine (青島神社, Aoshima jinja) is a Shinto shrine located on Aoshima island, Miyazaki Prefecture, Japan. It is dedicated to Hikohohodemi no Mikoto and Toyotama-hime.
