= Aoshima Subtropical Botanical Garden =

Botanical garden in Miyazaki, Miyazaki Prefecture, Japan

Coordinates: 31°48′6″N 131°28′11″E

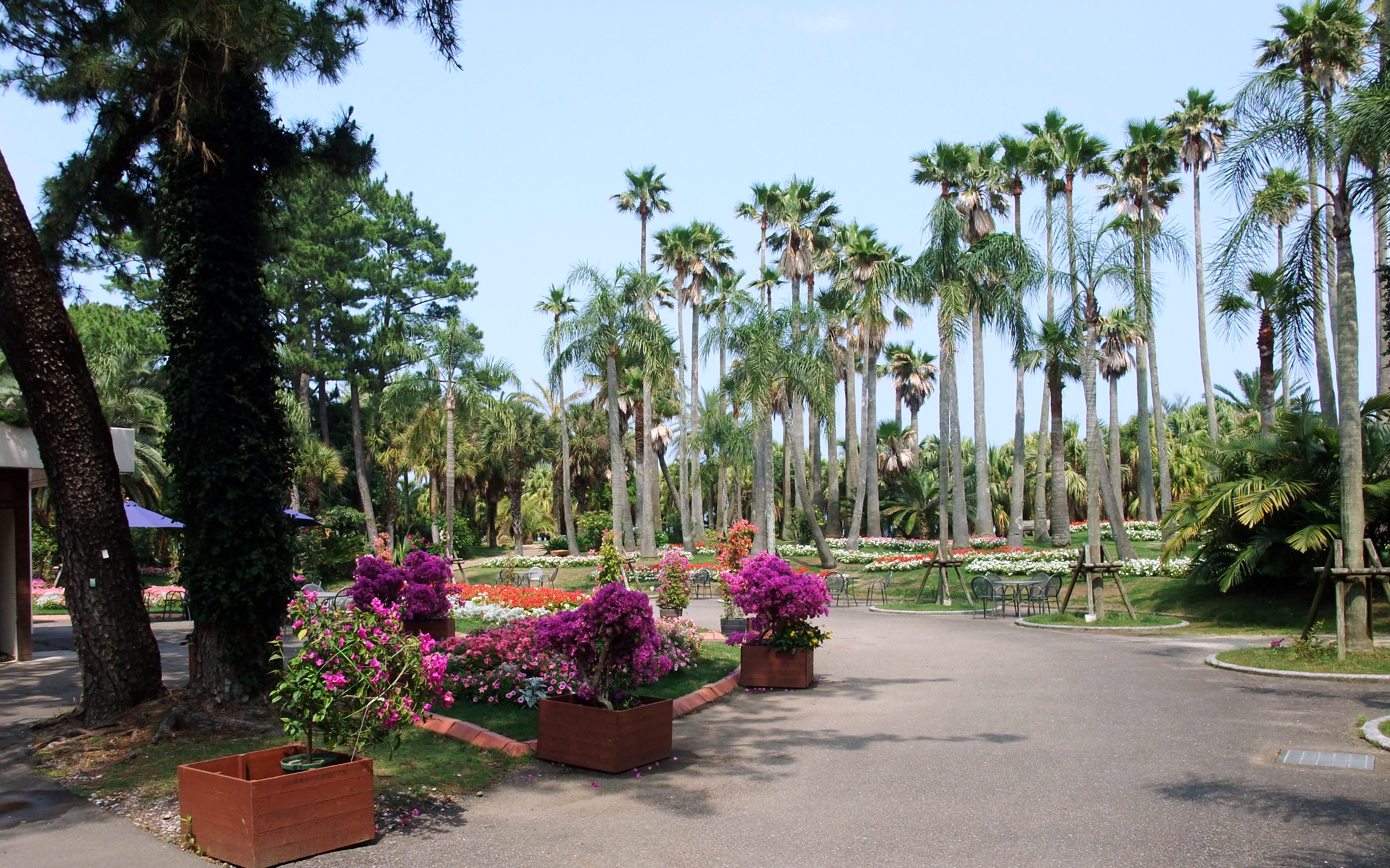
In 2009

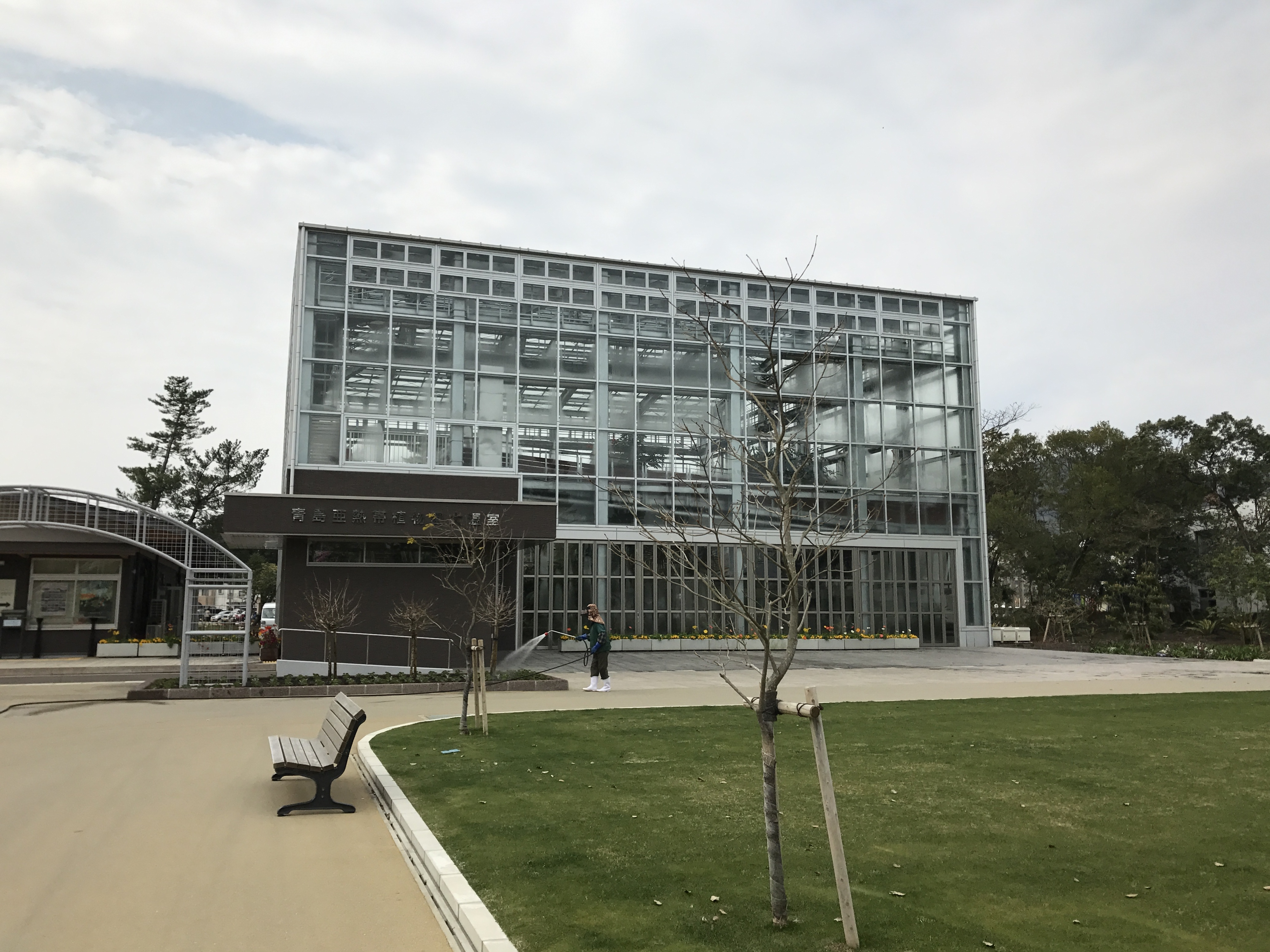
Greenhouse

The Aoshima Subtropical Botanical Garden (青島亜熱帯植物園, Aoshima Anettai Shokubutsuen) is a botanical garden located in the Aoshima neighborhood of the city of Miyazaki, Miyazaki Prefecture, Japan, near the island of Aoshima.

The garden contains 400 species of subtropical plants.

== See also ==
- List of botanical gardens in Japan
- List of Special Places of Scenic Beauty, Special Historic Sites and Special Natural Monuments
