= Kitagō Station =

Railway station in Nichinan, Miyazaki Prefecture, Japan

Kitagō Station 北郷駅
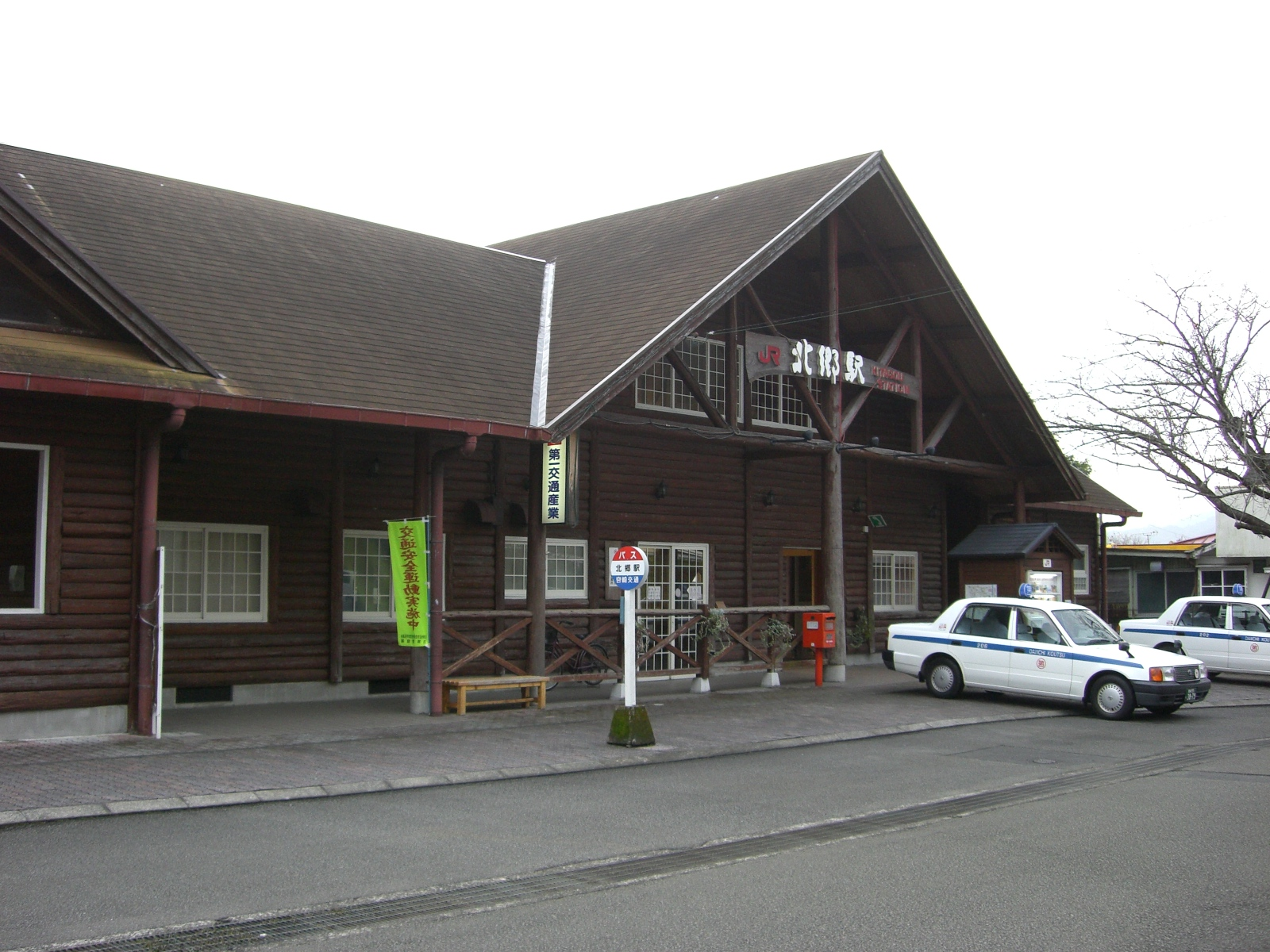
- Kitagō Station in 2007

General information
- Location: Kitagocho Gonohara, Nichinan-shi, Miyazaki-ken 889-2402; Japan
- Coordinates: 31°40′42″N 131°22′25″E
- Operator: JR Kyushu
- Line: ■ Nichinan Line
- Distance: 32.5 km from Minami-Miyazaki
- Platforms: 1 island platform
- Tracks: 2 + 1 siding

Construction
- Structure type: At grade

Other information
- Status: Unstaffed
- Website: Official website

History
- Opened: 28 October 1941

Passengers
- FY2016: 71 daily

Services
Preceding station	JR Kyushu	Following station
Ibii towards Minami-Miyazaki	Nichinan Line	Uchinoda towards Shibushi
Location
- Location within Miyazaki Prefecture Location within Japan

Kitagō Station (北郷駅, Kitagō-eki) is a passenger railway station located in the city of Nichinan, Miyazaki Prefecture, Japan. It is operated by JR Kyushu and is on the Nichinan Line.

== Lines ==
The station is served by the Nichinan Line and is located 32.5 km from the starting point of the line at Minami-Miyazaki.

== Layout ==
The station consists of an island platform serving two tracks at grade, with a siding. The station building is a timber built structure in loghouse style with wooden fittings and furniture inside. It is unstaffed and serves only as a waiting room.

=== Platforms ===
West (station side)	■ ■ Nichinan Line	for Aburatsu and Shibushi
East	■ ■ Nichinan Line	for Miyazaki and Minami-Miyazaki

== History ==
Japanese Government Railways (JGR) had opened the Shibushi Line from Nishi-Miyakonojō to Sueyoshi (now closed) in 1923. By 1925, the line had been extended eastwards to the east coast of Kyushu at Shibushi. The line was then extended northwards in phases, with Kitagō opening as the northern terminus on 28 October 1941. Subsequently, Japanese National Railways (JNR), the postwar successor of JGR, extended the track further north from Kitagō towards Minami-Miyazaki. The linkup was completed on 8 May 1963, whereupon the stretch from Shibushi through Kitagō to Minami-Miyazaki was designated as the Nichinan Line. Freight operations were discontinued in 11971 and baggage handling in 1984. With the privatization of JNR on 1 April 1987, the station came under the control of JR Kyushu.

== Passenger statistics ==
In fiscal 2016, the station was used by an average of 71 passengers (boarding only) per day.

== Surrounding area ==
- Nichinan City Kitagō Town General Branch (formerly Kitagō Town Hall)
- Kitagō Onsen

== See also ==
- List of railway stations in Japan
