= Nichinan, Miyazaki =

Nichinan 日南市
- City
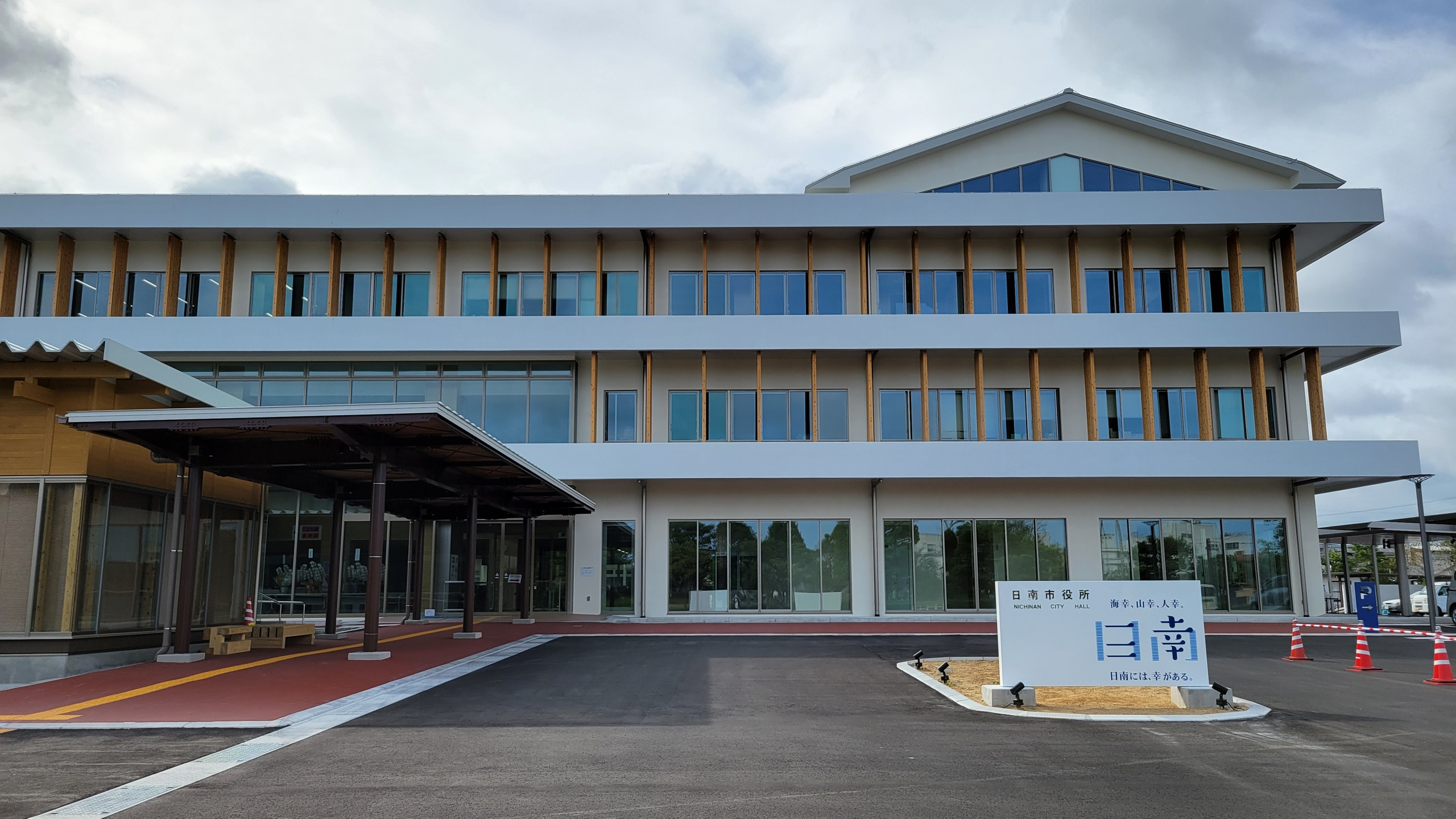
- Nichinan City Hall

- Flag Emblem
- Location of Nichinan in Miyazaki Prefecture

- Location in Japan
- Coordinates: 31°36′7″N 131°22′43″E
- Country: Japan
- Region: Kyushu
- Prefecture: Miyazaki

Government
  - Mayor: Kyohei Sakita (﨑田恭平)

Area
  - Total: 536.11 km^{2} (206.99 sq mi)

Population (March 31, 2023)
  - Total: 47,827
  - Density: 89.211/km^{2} (231.06/sq mi)
- Time zone: UTC+09:00 (JST)
- City hall address: 1-1-1 Chūō-dōri, Nichinan-shi, Miyazaki-ken 887-8585
- Climate: Cfa
- Website: Official website
- Symbols
- Bird: Common kingfisher
- Flower: Farfugium japonicum
- Tree: Obi sugi (Cryptomeria)

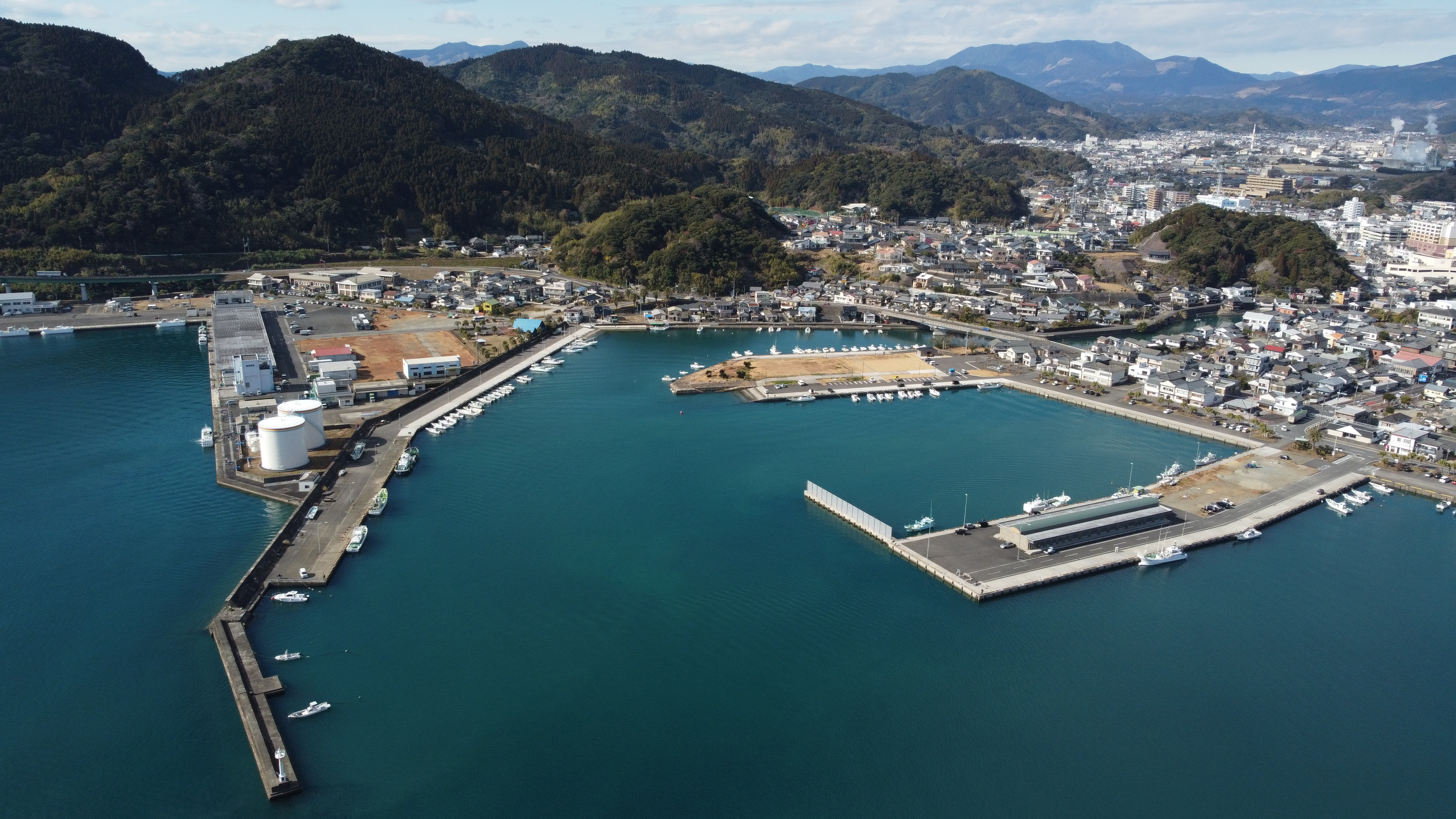
Aburatsu Port

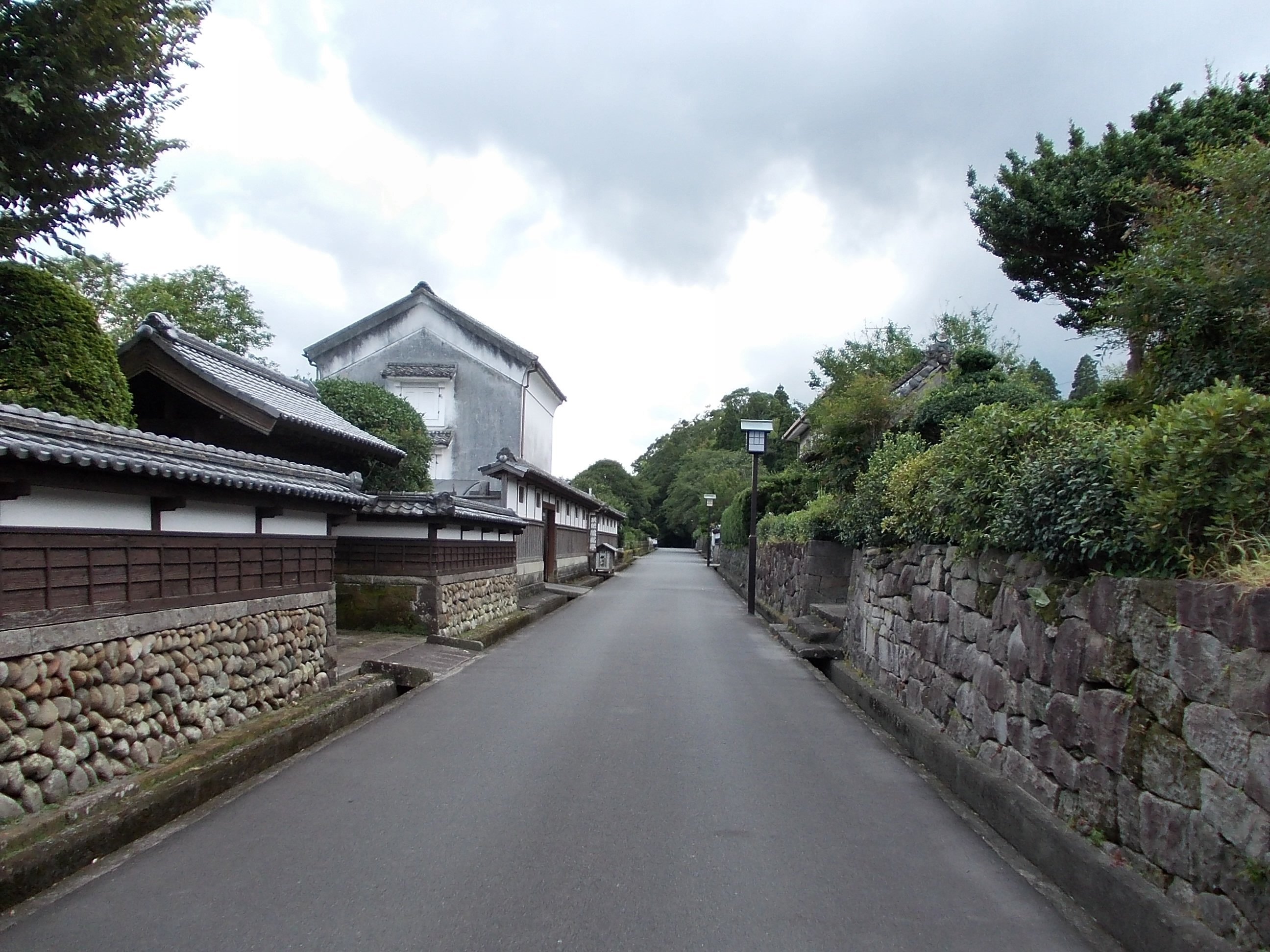
Obi castle town

Nichinan (日南市, Nichinan-shi) is a city in Miyazaki Prefecture, Japan. As of 1 May 2023, the city had an estimated population of 47,872 in 21482 households, and a population density of 89 persons per km^{2}. The total area of the city is 536.11 km^{2} (206.99 sq mi).

== Geography ==
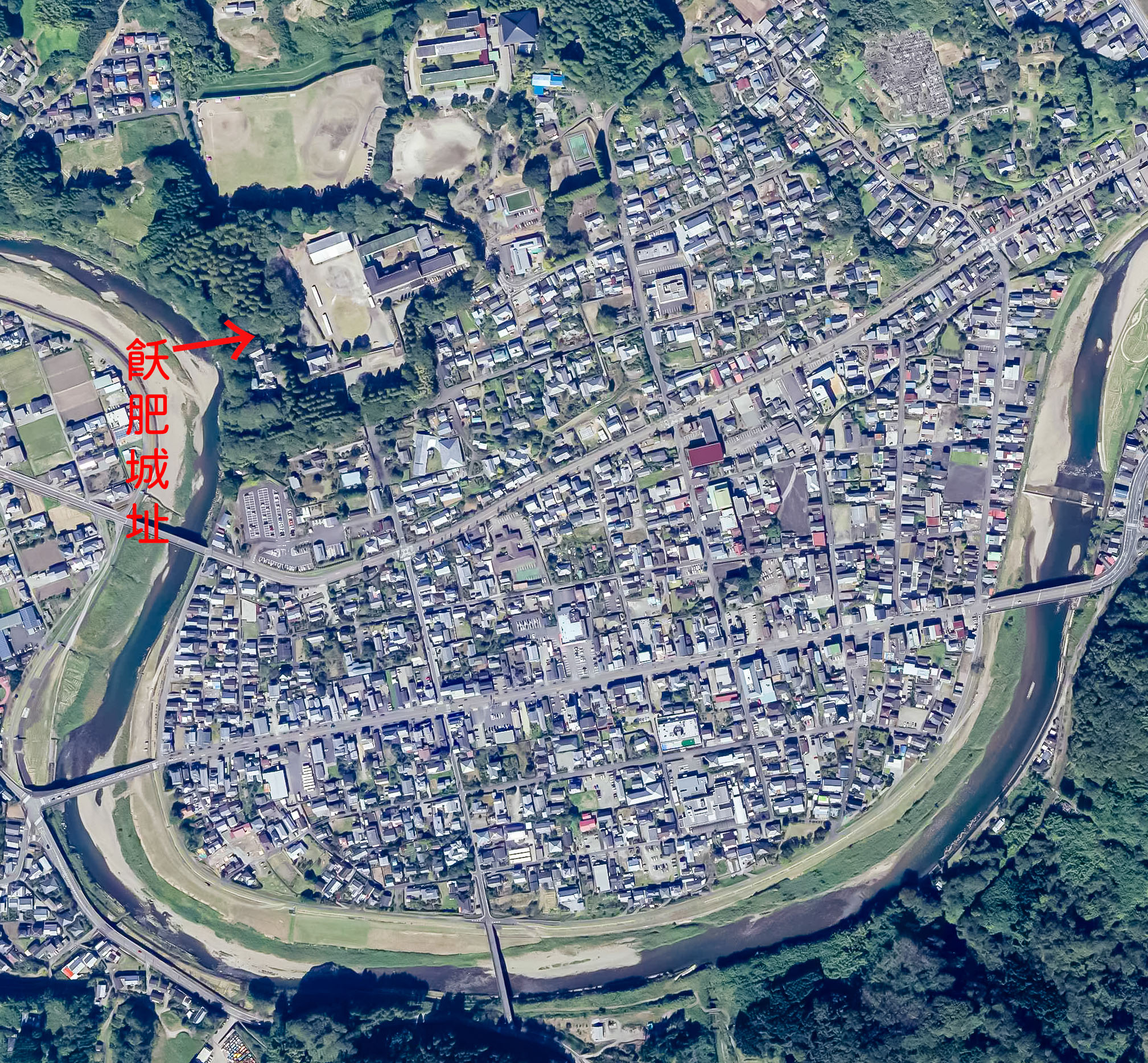
Aeral Photo of Obi Castle and central Obi in Nichinan

Nichinan is located in the southern part of Miyazaki Prefecture on Japan's southernmost main island, Kyūshū. It is surrounded by the Wanizuka mountain range on the north, east and south, and faces the Hyūga Sea to the east. Much of the city is within the borders of Nichinan Kaigan Quasi-National Park. Approximately 78% of the city's area is forest, much of which is occupied by the Obi cedar, a specialty tree. The Sakatanigawa River runs through the city from east to west. This river joins the Hiroto River near its mouth and flows into the Pacific Ocean.

=== Climate ===
Nichinan has a humid subtropical climate (Köppen climate classification Cfa) with hot, humid summers and cool winters. The average annual temperature in Nichinan is 18.4 °C (65.1 °F). The average annual rainfall is 2,763.8 mm (108.81 in) with June as the wettest month. The temperatures are highest on average in August, at around 27.8 °C (82.0 °F), and lowest in January, at around 8.9 °C (48.0 °F). The highest temperature ever recorded in Nichinan was 38.1 °C (100.6 °F) on 2 August 2013; the coldest temperature ever recorded was −5.1 °C (22.8 °F) on 24 January 1976.

Climate data for Port Aburatsu, Nichinan (1991−2020 normals, extremes 1949−present)
| Month | Jan | Feb | Mar | Apr | May | Jun | Jul | Aug | Sep | Oct | Nov | Dec | Year |
|---|---|---|---|---|---|---|---|---|---|---|---|---|---|
| Record high °C (°F) | 26.3 (79.3) | 24.7 (76.5) | 29.4 (84.9) | 30.0 (86.0) | 33.0 (91.4) | 34.6 (94.3) | 37.5 (99.5) | 38.1 (100.6) | 36.2 (97.2) | 32.6 (90.7) | 29.9 (85.8) | 24.3 (75.7) | 38.1 (100.6) |
| Mean maximum °C (°F) | 19.8 (67.6) | 21.4 (70.5) | 23.4 (74.1) | 26.6 (79.9) | 29.3 (84.7) | 32.1 (89.8) | 35.0 (95.0) | 34.9 (94.8) | 33.1 (91.6) | 29.5 (85.1) | 25.7 (78.3) | 21.5 (70.7) | 35.4 (95.7) |
| Mean daily maximum °C (°F) | 13.6 (56.5) | 14.6 (58.3) | 17.3 (63.1) | 21.2 (70.2) | 24.6 (76.3) | 26.6 (79.9) | 30.8 (87.4) | 31.5 (88.7) | 28.9 (84.0) | 24.9 (76.8) | 20.4 (68.7) | 15.7 (60.3) | 22.5 (72.5) |
| Daily mean °C (°F) | 8.9 (48.0) | 10.0 (50.0) | 12.9 (55.2) | 16.9 (62.4) | 20.6 (69.1) | 23.4 (74.1) | 27.2 (81.0) | 27.8 (82.0) | 25.3 (77.5) | 20.9 (69.6) | 15.9 (60.6) | 10.9 (51.6) | 18.4 (65.1) |
| Mean daily minimum °C (°F) | 4.6 (40.3) | 5.6 (42.1) | 8.5 (47.3) | 12.6 (54.7) | 16.8 (62.2) | 20.6 (69.1) | 24.4 (75.9) | 24.9 (76.8) | 22.3 (72.1) | 17.4 (63.3) | 12.0 (53.6) | 6.6 (43.9) | 14.7 (58.4) |
| Mean minimum °C (°F) | −0.6 (30.9) | −0.1 (31.8) | 2.1 (35.8) | 5.8 (42.4) | 11.7 (53.1) | 16.2 (61.2) | 21.1 (70.0) | 22.4 (72.3) | 17.7 (63.9) | 11.5 (52.7) | 5.6 (42.1) | 0.7 (33.3) | −1.2 (29.8) |
| Record low °C (°F) | −5.1 (22.8) | −4.6 (23.7) | −2.7 (27.1) | 0.1 (32.2) | 7.4 (45.3) | 12.5 (54.5) | 16.7 (62.1) | 17.5 (63.5) | 11.6 (52.9) | 4.4 (39.9) | −0.7 (30.7) | −4.8 (23.4) | −5.1 (22.8) |
| Average precipitation mm (inches) | 83.9 (3.30) | 132.5 (5.22) | 193.2 (7.61) | 236.7 (9.32) | 247.6 (9.75) | 564.7 (22.23) | 310.4 (12.22) | 230.8 (9.09) | 307.1 (12.09) | 227.8 (8.97) | 137.0 (5.39) | 92.1 (3.63) | 2,763.8 (108.81) |
| Average precipitation days (≥ 1.0 mm) | 6.4 | 7.7 | 11.3 | 10.7 | 10.6 | 16.6 | 11.4 | 12.4 | 12.4 | 8.8 | 7.8 | 5.6 | 121.7 |
| Average relative humidity (%) | 63 | 65 | 67 | 70 | 74 | 82 | 80 | 80 | 78 | 73 | 71 | 66 | 72 |
| Mean monthly sunshine hours | 169.3 | 151.5 | 161.1 | 166.7 | 167.3 | 109.3 | 188.8 | 202.4 | 154.9 | 161.0 | 154.0 | 165.1 | 1,951.4 |
Source: Japan Meteorological Agency

=== Demographics ===
Per Japanese census data, the population of Nichinan in 2020 is 50,848 people. Nichinan has been conducting censuses since 1920.

Historical population

| Year | Pop. | ±% |
|---|---|---|
| 1920 | 50,385 | — |
| 1925 | 52,794 | +4.8% |
| 1930 | 56,867 | +7.7% |
| 1935 | 60,770 | +6.9% |
| 1940 | 62,663 | +3.1% |
| 1945 | 79,267 | +26.5% |
| 1950 | 84,225 | +6.3% |
| 1955 | 86,889 | +3.2% |
| 1960 | 85,279 | −1.9% |
| 1965 | 78,398 | −8.1% |
| 1970 | 72,231 | −7.9% |

| Year | Pop. | ±% |
|---|---|---|
| 1975 | 70,768 | −2.0% |
| 1980 | 72,785 | +2.9% |
| 1985 | 71,535 | −1.7% |
| 1990 | 68,176 | −4.7% |
| 1995 | 65,809 | −3.5% |
| 2000 | 63,421 | −3.6% |
| 2005 | 60,914 | −4.0% |
| 2010 | 57,702 | −5.3% |
| 2015 | 54,090 | −6.3% |
| 2020 | 50,848 | −6.0% |

Nichinan population statistics

== History ==
The area of Nichinan was part of ancient Hyūga Province. During the Sengoku period, the area was ruled by the Itō clan based at Obi Castle and the site of numerous battles with the neighbouring Shimazu clan. The Shimazu clan had unified Satsuma Province and Ōsumi Province under its control, and began to clash with the Itō in 1570. The Itō were finally defeated by the Shimazu clan in 1578. After seeking help from the hegemon Toyotomi Hideyoshi, the family's lands were restored in 1587 after his invasion of Kyūshū. By the Edo period, the Itō clan ruled as daimyō of Obi Domain, and the present-day city borders roughly correspond to the holdings of the domain. The domain was noted for the quality of its han school, one of whose graduates was the Meiji period diplomat Marquis Komura Jutarō.

The town of Aburatsu and the villages of Agata, Obi, Hosoda, Nangō and Tōgō were established on May 1, 1889 with the creation of the modern municipalities system. Obi was raised to town status on January 1, 1900, followed by Nangō on December 1, 1940, Hosoda on January 1, 1941 and Agata on May 3, 1950. On January 1, 1950, the city of Nichinan was established through an amalgamation of the towns of Agata, Aburatsu, and Obi, and the village of Tōgō. On February 1, 1955, Futo village and Hosoda town joined the city. On April 1, 1956, Nichinan absorbed Sakatani village, Kahara village, and the Odotsu district.

Since 1963, Nichinan has been the spring training location for the Hiroshima Carp baseball team.

In 1999, a 12-meter wharf was completed at the eastern head of Aburatsu port. Aburatsu's increasing role as a harbor has made it a regular stopover for both domestic and foreign ships, and it is becoming an authentic international trading port. From 2001 to 2010, a general plan for the future of Nichinan was drawn up, with the simple theme of progressing Nichinan as, "a city that combines its fragrant history and culture with the sunshine and lush green mountains."

During the nationwide round of Heisei-era mergers, the Nichinan-Kitagō-Nangō Merger Association (日南市・北郷町・南郷町合併協議会, Nichinan-shi-Kitagō-chō-Nangō-chō Gappei Kyōgikai) was formed in August 2004 by the area's residents to consider the merger of the three municipalities. The group was dissolved in May 2005 when the Kitagō Town Council vetoed the proposed merger bill despite support for the merger by residents in both Kitagō and Nangō towns. The association was reconstituted on September 28, 2007, when merger supporters in both towns gained majorities on their respective town councils. On March 30, 2009, the three municipalities agreed to merge and become the new city of Nichinan.

On August 8, 2024 at 16:22 JST, the 7.1 M_{w} 2024 Hyūga-nada earthquake struck in the Hyūga Sea off the coast of Miyazaki Prefecture, Kyushu, Japan, 20 km (12 mi) northeast of Nichinan. Nichinan experienced seismic intensity of 6- on the Japan Meteorological Agency seismic intensity scale.

== Government ==
Nichinan has a mayor-council form of government with a directly elected mayor and a unicameral city council of 19 members. Nichinan contributes two members to the Miyazaki Prefectural Assembly. In terms of national politics, the city is part of the Miyazaki 1st district of the lower house of the Diet of Japan.

== Economy ==
Agriculture, forestry and fisheries and the pillars of the local economy. Commercial fishing of bonito was designated as a Japanese agricultural heritage in 2021 and Katsuomeshi, a dish of bonito sashimi served with soy sauce, is a noted local dish. Mandarin oranges, ponkan, sweet peas, green peppers, kumquats, and rice are the main agricultural products of Nichinan.

== Education ==
Nichinan has 14 public elementary schools, seven public junior high schools and three combined elementary/middle schools operated by the city, and two public high schools operated by the Miyazaki Prefectural Board of Education. There is also one private junior high school and one private high school. The prefecture also operates one special education school for the handicapped.

== Transportation ==
=== Railways ===
JR Kyushu - Nichinan Line

- Ibii - Kitagō - Uchinoda - Obi - Nichinan - Aburatsu - Ōdōtsu - Nangō - Taninokuchi - Yowara

=== Highways ===
- Higashikyushu Expressway
- National Route 220
- National Route 222
- National Route 448

== Educational facilities ==
There are seven kindergartens, 14 elementary schools, 11 junior high schools, and three high schools located within the city.

== Sister cities ==
- (Japan) Naha, Okinawa Prefecture, since April 24, 1969
- Portsmouth, New Hampshire, United States, since September 5, 1985
- (Japan) Inuyama, Aichi Prefecture, since August 10, 2000
- Albany, Western Australia, Australia, since November 17, 2010

== Media ==
- The Obi district of Nichinan was the location for the NHK television series "Wakaba" broadcast from September 2004 to March 2005.

== Local attractions ==
=== Festivals and events ===
There are three major yearly festivals in Nichinan:

- Chikkō-en Sakura Festival (竹香園桜まつり): This festival typically occurs between late March and early April when the approximately 1,000 cherry trees of Chikkō-en come into bloom.
- Aburatsu Port Festival (油津港まつり): This festival at the port of Aburatsu features Japanese rowing and shihanmato (bow and arrow) competitions. Usually held the third weekend of July, there are also street stalls, a fireworks display, and tours of a Maritime Self-Defense Force vessel.
- Obi Castle Festival (飫肥城下まつり): Held the third weekend of October in the former Obi Town, this Edo period festival features a procession of warriors, the traditional Nichinan Taihei dance, and princesses of the festival among the many public events.

Other events include spring and autumn training for the Hiroshima Carp baseball team, swimming and marathon events, and monthly morning markets held at Aburatsu port and in front of Nichinan City Hall.

=== Temples and shrines ===
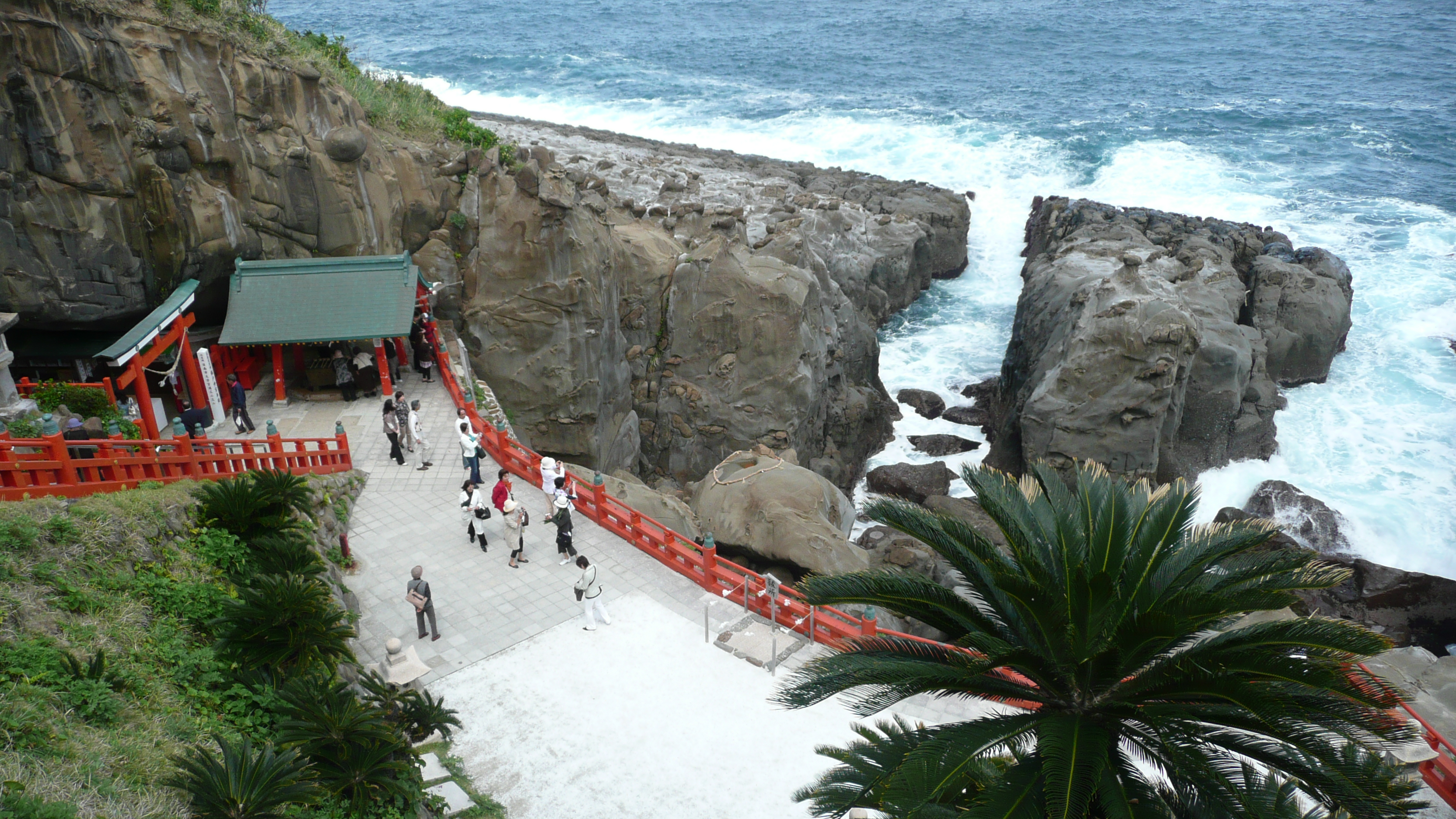
Udo Shrine

- Udo Shrine (鵜戸神宮, Udo jingū): A shrine built in a cave on a cliff on the coast. According to myth, the main deity of the shrine is the father of the first emperor of Japan, Emperor Jinmu. Visitors pray at the shrine for success in matchmaking and safe childbirth. Below the cliff there is a huge rock shaped like a turtle. It is said that one's wishes will be granted if one can throw a stone into the depression in the center.

=== Points of interest ===
- Obi Castle (飫肥城, Obi-jō): The main gate of the castle was restored with 100-year-old Obi cedar in 1978. In the castle, the samurai's mansion, the storehouse, and the white-walled merchant building still remain. The castle town produced 51,000 koku of rice. Because of its many cultural and historic landmarks, it is called the "Little Kyoto" of Kyūshū. The Obi castle town has been designated as an Important Preservation District for Groups of Traditional Buildings in Japan.
- Matsuo no Maru (松尾の丸): A replica of the original palace reconstructed using 100-year-old Obi cedar.
- Horikawa Canal District (堀河運河周辺, Horikawa unga shūhen): A restored canal district in Aburatsu known as the location for the movie Otoko wa tsurai yo. The canal is 900 meters long and was built at the beginning of the Edo period in 1685. The main purpose of its construction was to transport Obi cedar safely down to the port from inland logging areas.
- Tsu no mine (津の峯): A mountain looking out over the port of Aburatsu. Locally, it is called the watchtower mountain, and in the Second World War it became an air raid watchtower. It was also used as a weather forecasting mountain by fleets of ships based at Aburatsu Port during the days of the Obi clan. The ships used the summit of the harbor as a marker and made their way into Aburatsu Port.

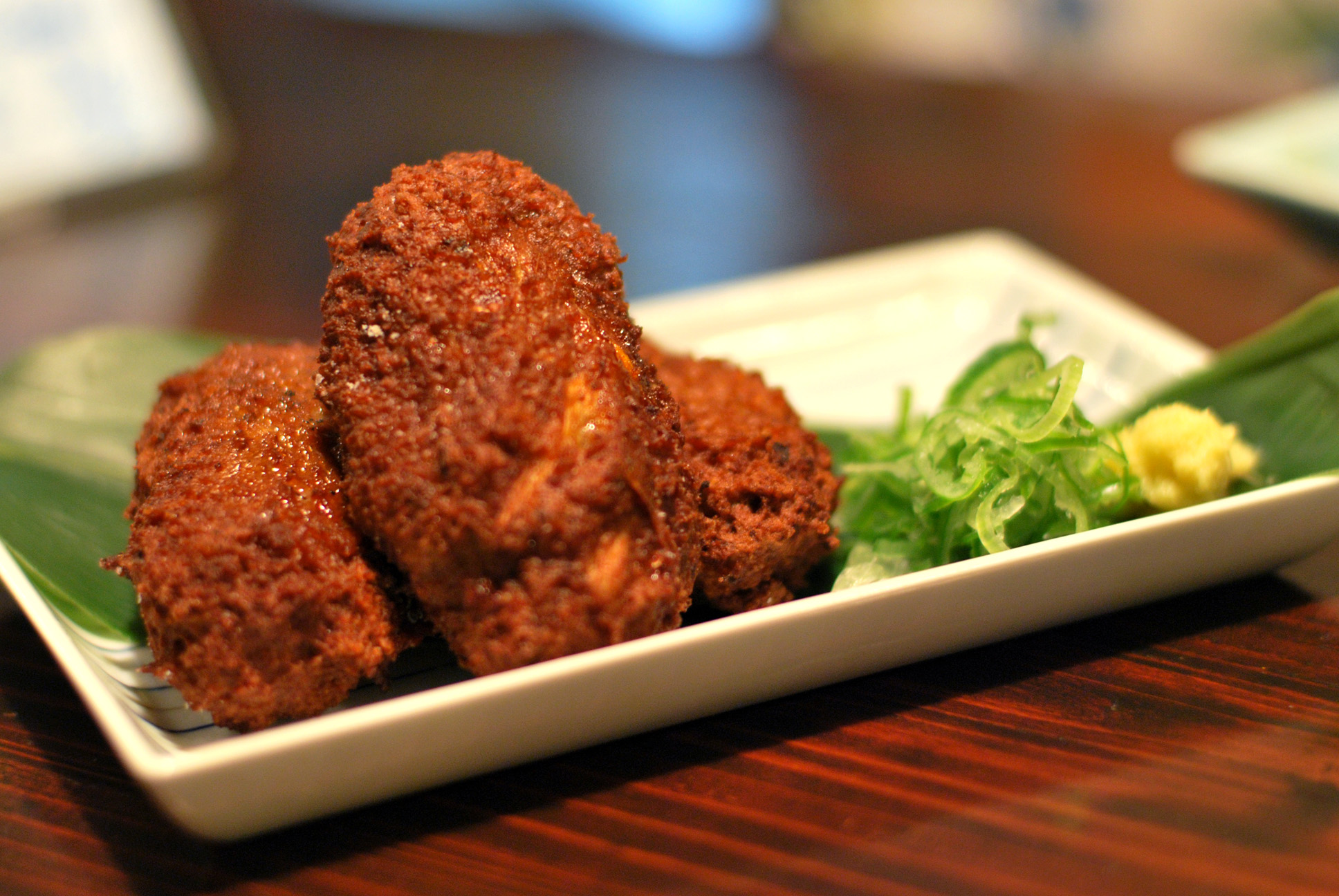
Obi-ten, a type of fried kamaboko (fish cake) in Nichinan City

Other points of interest include:

- Merchant House Museum (商家資料館, shōka shiryōkan):
- Shintoku Domain School (藩校 振徳堂, hankō shintoku-dō)
- International Exchange Center and Komura Memorial Hall (国際交流センター小村記念館, kokusai kōryū sentā komura kinenkan)
- Former Home of Itō Denzaemon (旧伊東伝左衛門家, kyū-Itō Denzaemon-ke)
- Horikawa Bridge (堀河橋, Horikawa-bashi)
- Horikawa Museum (堀河資料館, Horikawa shiryōkan)
- Red Brick Hall (赤レンガ館, Aka renga kan)
- Izakibana Park (猪崎鼻公園, Izakibana kōen)
- Sun Messe Nichinan (サンメッセ日南)
