= Obi, Nichinan =

Coordinates: 31.626725°N 131.353183°E

Obi, Nichinan 飫肥
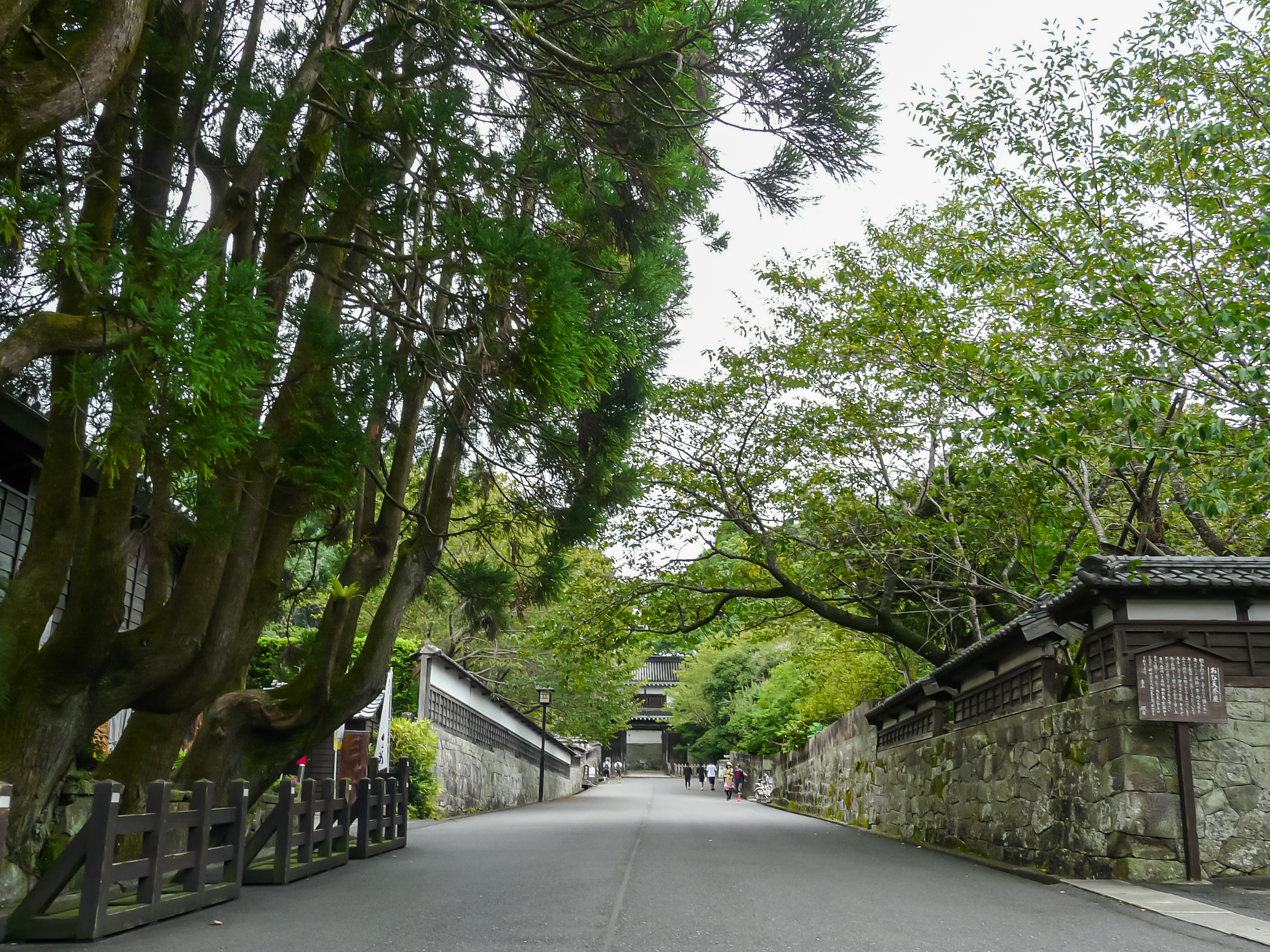
- Street of Ōte-mon gate of Obi Castle
- Interactive map of Obi, Nichinan

Obi (飫肥) is a district located in Nichinan, in the southern part of Miyazaki Prefecture, in the Kyushu region of Japan. During the Edo period, it was the Jōkamachi (castle town) of Obi Castle, which was the seat of the Obi Domain, which was ruled by the Ito clan. The district was originally planned and laid out in the early Edo period, and the historical townscape has been preserved to this day. The district has been designated as an Important Preservation District for Groups of Traditional Buildings in Japan, and is also known as the "Little Kyoto of Kyushu."

== Geography and History ==
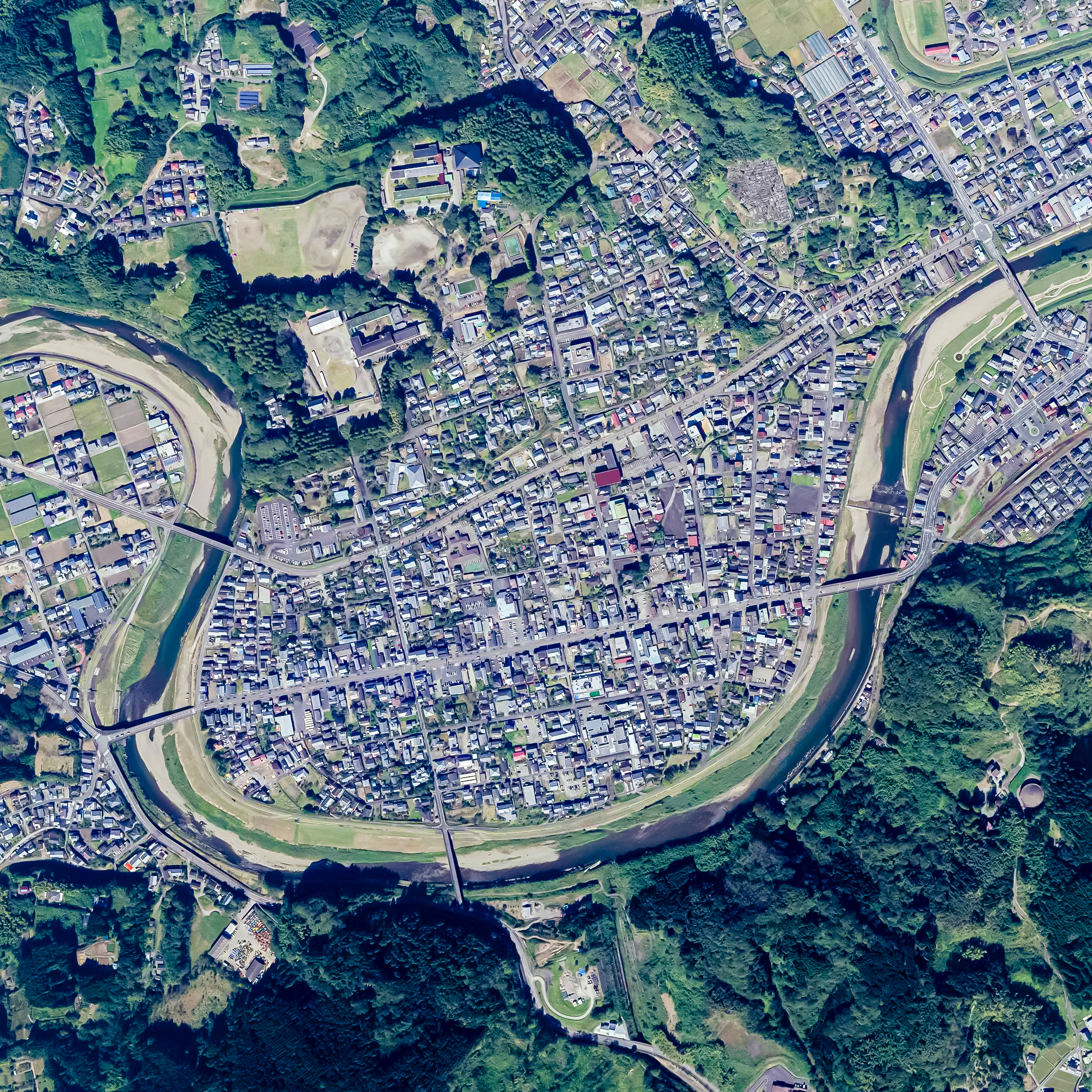
Aerial photograph of Obi castle town

Obi district was originally a Fujiwara Shōen that was developed in the Heian period. It was located at a strategic location, with the important ports of Aburatsu (油津) and Sotonoura (外之浦) to the south, and the second largest city in this region, Miyakonojō, to the west. Obi Castle was built on a hill in the Shirasu Plateau to the north of Obi district. The history of the castle is not clear, but it is believed that the Obi-in (office), one of the eight districts of Hyūga, that was placed in the manor during the manor period was the origin of the castle.

Obi District is surrounded by a Sakatani river on three sides: east, west, and south. The south side of the Sakatani river, the east side, and the north side of the castle are surrounded by mountains and hills, making Obi District a natural fortress in a basin shape.

In the late Muromachi period, in 1458, the Shimazu clan, which was based in the south of Kyushu, sent their vassal, Niiro Tadatsugu, who was the lord of Shibushi Castle, to Obi Castle in preparation for the invasion of the south of Kyushu by the Ito clan. In 1484, the Ito clan attacked Obi, and since then, the battle for Obi between the Ito clan and the Shimazu clan continued for about 100 years. In 1587, Toyotomi Hideyoshi conquered Kyushu, and Itō Suketaka was awarded Obi Castle for his achievements. Since then, the Ito clan has ruled Obi Domain as a castle town with 51,000 Koku (石) for 14 generations for about 280 years until the abolition of the han (feudal) system in 1871 during the Meiji period.

Obi Castle was a medieval castle of the old type that used the natural terrain of the Shirasu Plateau. The castle was severely damaged by a major earthquake in 1684, but it was rebuilt in a modern style of Edo period with the use of stone walls. These stone walls still remain today. However, when looking over the entire castle layout, many parts still retain their natural terrain.

Obi Domain had a vast mountain range and a long coastline, but it had little flat land, so there was little good farmland and the production of agricultural products was low. As a result, the domain could not expect to earn revenue from agricultural products. Obi district was blessed with abundant forest resources, so the forest resources played a major role as the domain's main monopoly product in order to raise funds for the renovation of Obi Castle and the renovation of rivers. Obi district is a humid area, so the cedar trees in Obi grow quickly and have a lot of oil, making them light and elastic. These characteristics made them ideal for shipbuilding, and they became known throughout Japan. By 1800, the mountains within the domain of Obi had been transformed into cedar forests through the domain's reforestation efforts. The Obi cedar trees played a crucial role in supporting the domain's financial resources.

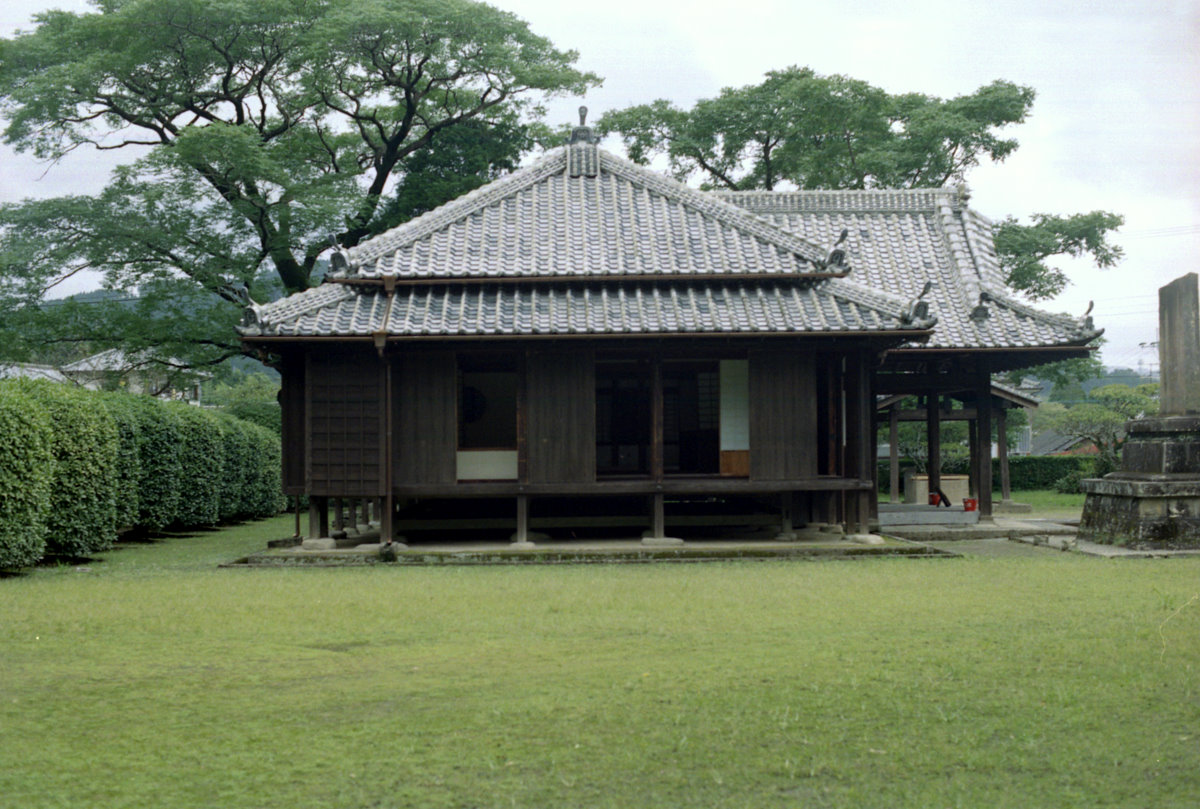
Shintoku domain school

In the 1800s, the domain felt the need for modernization and human resource development, and the 13th lord of the domain, Itō Suketomo, opened the Shintoku domain school in 1831. The school produced many talented people, including Count Komura Jutarō, a diplomat of the Meiji period.

The Meiji Restoration resulted in the abolition of the han (feudal) system in 1871 and the demolition of all the buildings in Obi Castle.

From the Meiji period to the 1960s, the Obi district experienced a prolonged economic boom, primarily driven by the cedar trees planted during the Edo period.

In 1950, the towns of Obi, Agata, Aburatsu, and Togō, which were divided into small administrative districts, merged to become the former Nichinan City.

The city of Nichinan began a restoration project of Obi Castle in 1974 to attract tourists.

In 1977, Obi district was designated as the first National Important Traditional Building Group Preservation District in Kyushu region.

In 2009, the cities of Nichinan, Kitagō, and Nangō merged to form the present-day Nichinan City, and the city's territory became nearly the same as it was during the Edo period as the Obi domain.

=== Jōkamachi ===
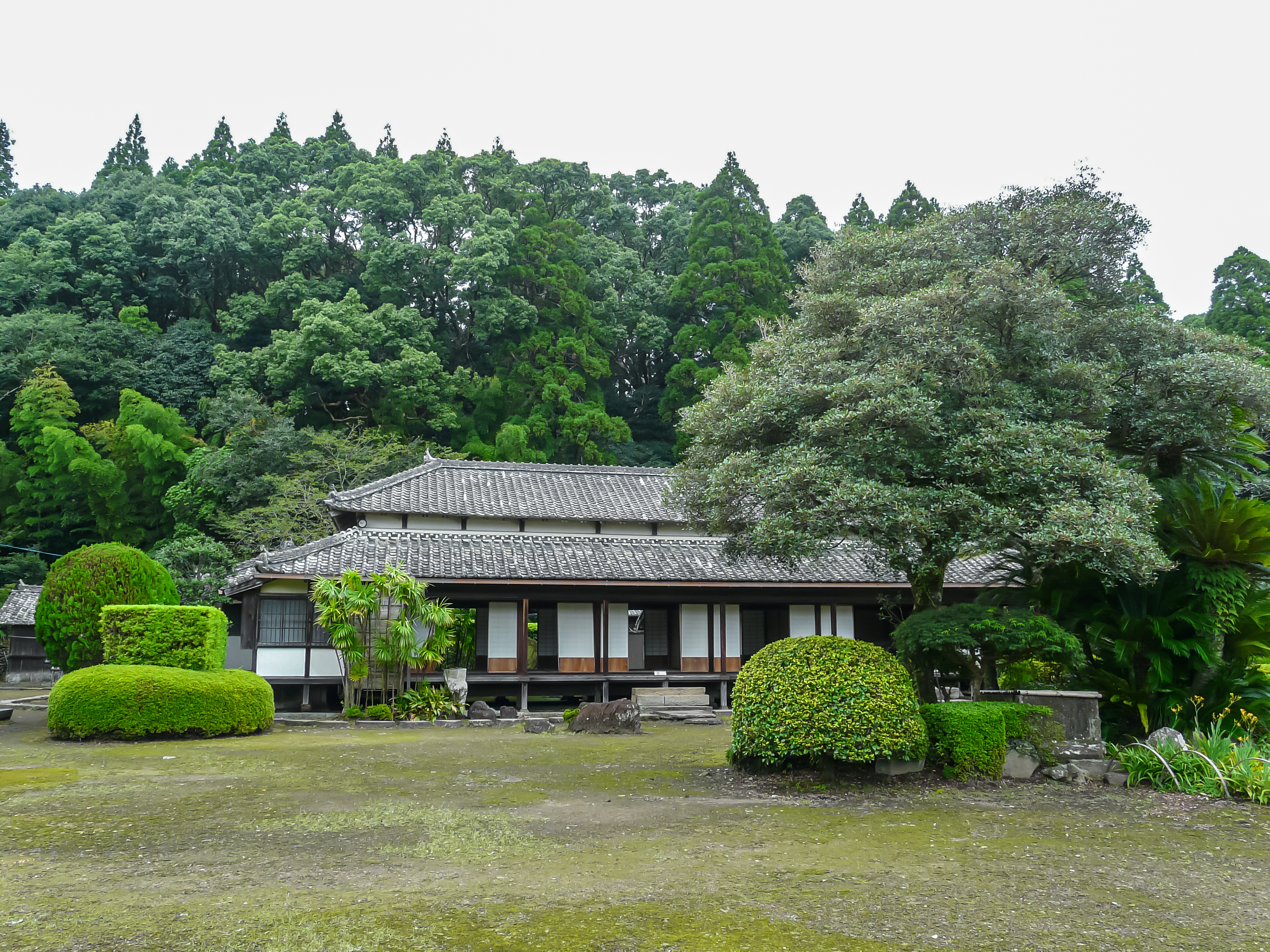
Samurai residences, Yoshōkan

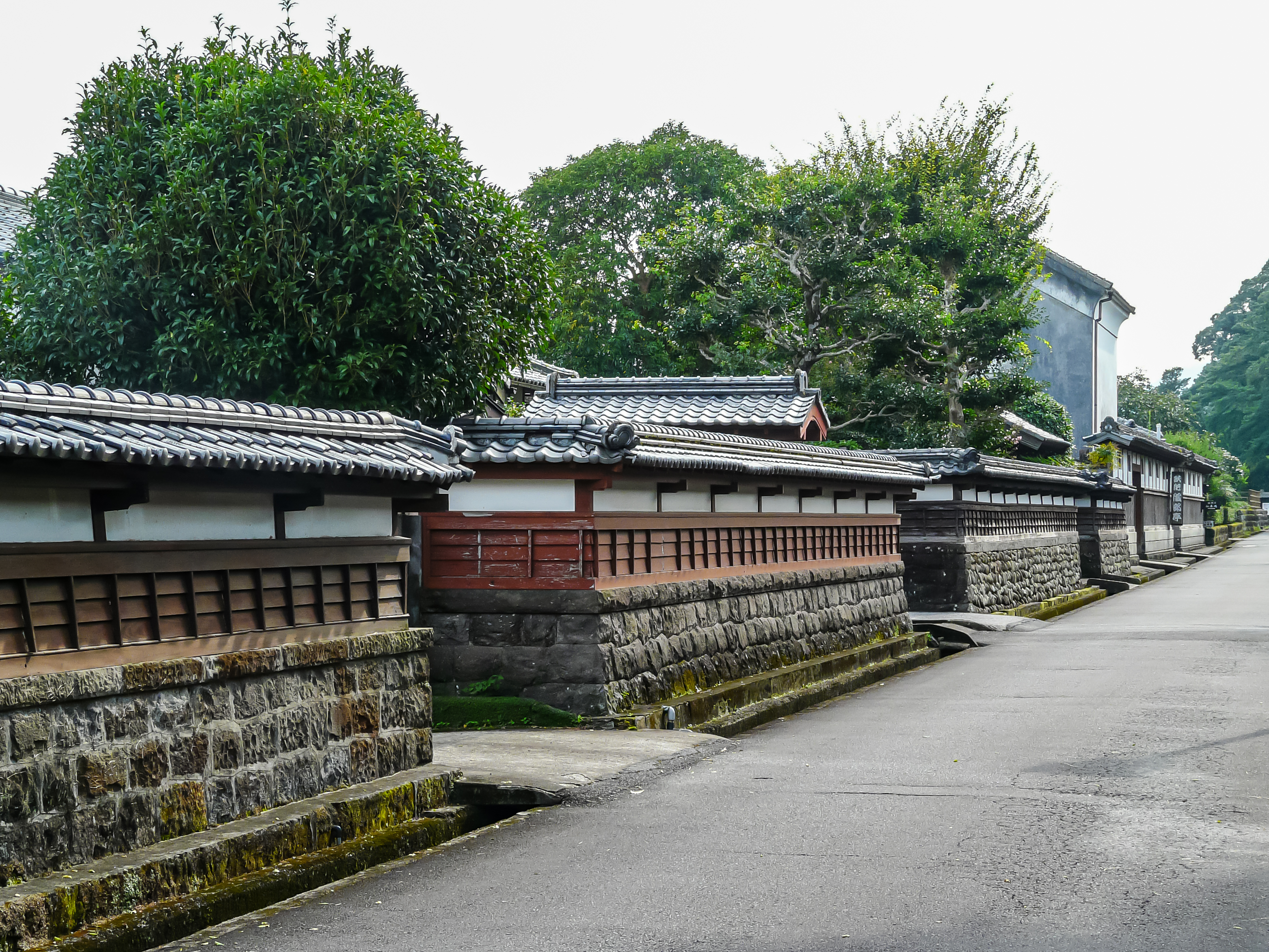
Yokobaba street

Itō Suketaka, who became the first lord of Obi Domain, immediately began the construction of the Jōkamachi (castle town) of Obi. According to the ancient document "Hyuga-ki (日向記)," this was recorded to have taken place in 1599 when urban planning and division of plots were carried out. Initially, the retainers of Obi Domain lived scattered in areas such as Kiyotake, Sakatani, and Nango. However, in 1615, the Tokugawa Shogunate established a system where each domain could have only one castle. As a result, the retainers moved to the Obi Castle town, which further accelerated the construction of the castle town. There is a map believed to have been drawn between 1650 and 1660, showing the layout of the castle town. With the exception of the Ogawa and Shimmachi areas that developed after the Meiji period, the current Obi district still retains almost the same road positions and divisions as depicted in the historical map. The castle town is located to the south of the castle and is said to have been designed in a manner similar to Heian-kyō. The town's layout forms a grid-like pattern that is almost square, and its historical ambiance bears resemblance to Kyoto. This has earned it the nickname "Little Kyoto of Kyushu" (or "Little Kyoto of Hyūga"). The width of the streets in the castle town has been maintained since the early Edo period. As a result, the gates, stone walls, and hedges that face the streets have also been well preserved in the same condition as the Edo period. The layout of the castle town was arranged in the following order, starting from the area closest to Obi Castle: upper-level Samurai district, middle-level Samurai district, common townspeople district, and lower-level Samurai district. Samurai residences featured gates corresponding to their social status, and they constructed buildings and stone walls using local materials such as Obi cedar and Obi stone. A characteristic feature is the planting of hedges, such as tea hedges, on top of these stone walls. The stone walls are made of a variety of materials, including cut Obi stone and river rock. Obi stone is a ignimbrite that is easy to work with, and is used in the stone walls of Obi Castle and samurai residences, as well as tombstones. After the Meiji Restoration, many of the samurai residences saw changes in occupants, and the buildings were rebuilt and the large grounds were divided into smaller plots. However, the majority of the divisions and streets still retain the characteristics of the early Edo period and have been preserved to the present day. The most significant changes to the town have been the widening of the Miyazaki Prefectural Route 432, which runs through the Obi district, in the 1960s, and the widening of National Route 222 in the 1970s. At that time, the Obi Chamber of Commerce took the lead in reconstructing and relocating houses, aiming to recreate the original townscape along the widened National Route, while preserving the traditional ambiance of the old houses. They incorporated thoughtful designs for bus stop signs, trash bins, benches, and other elements to maintain the nostalgic atmosphere. Additionally, they strategically placed wooden lanterns to further enhance the nostalgic charm of the town.

== Obi Castle restoration project ==
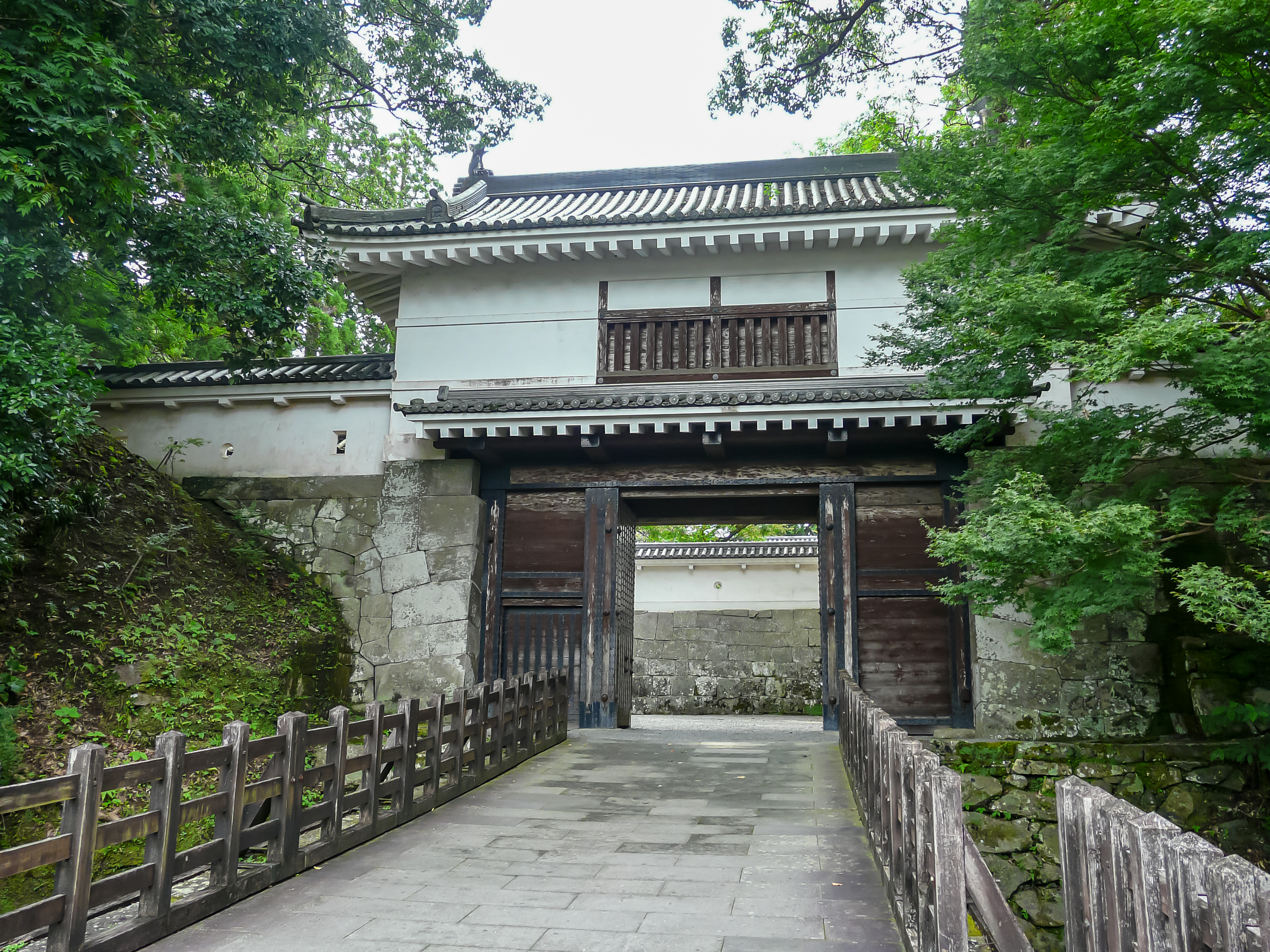
Ōtemon gate of the Castle

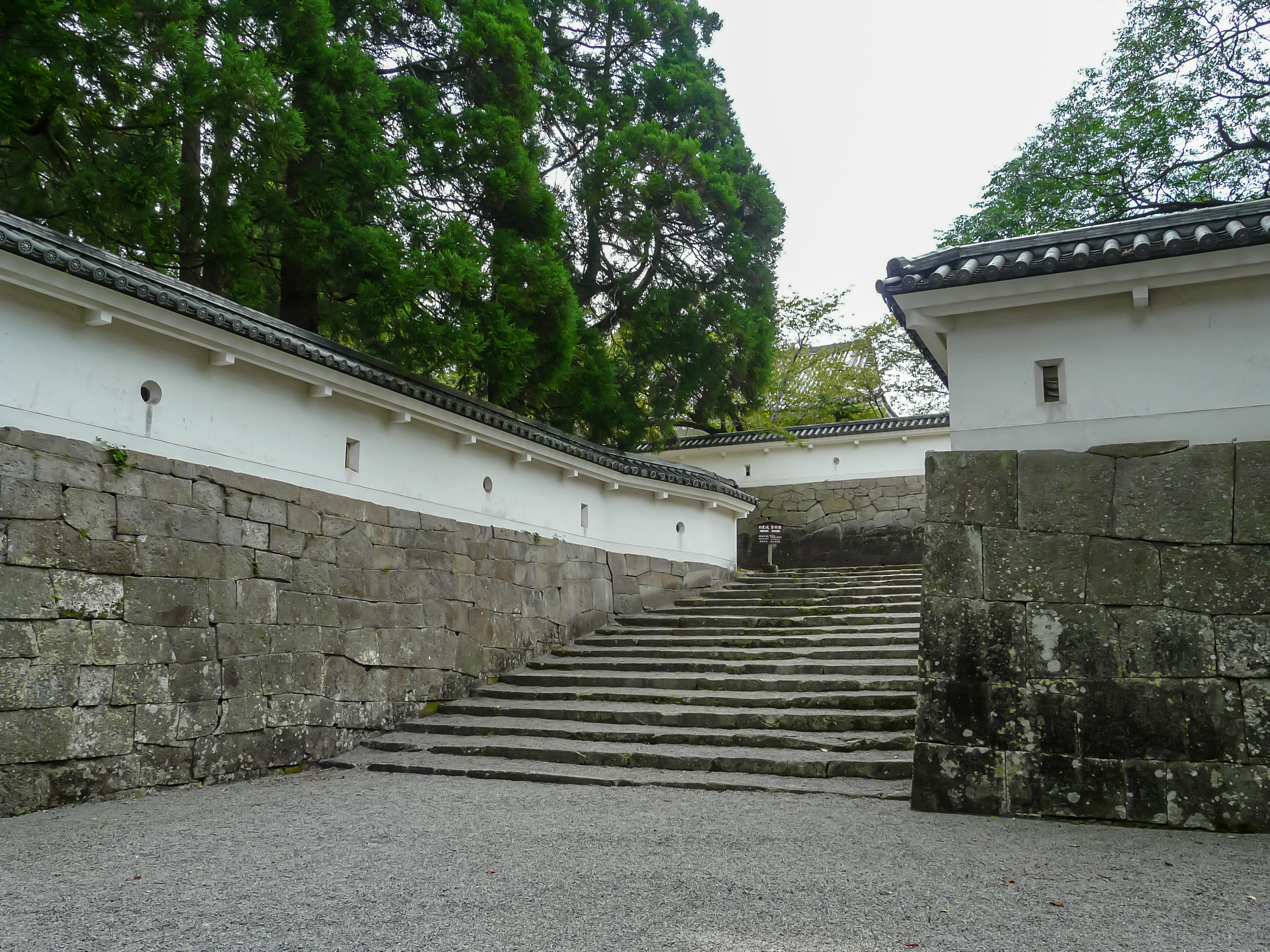
Stone walls of the Castle

In the city of Nichinan, there is Nichinan Kaigan Quasi-National Park. During the early stages of post-World War II reconstruction, the founder of Miyazaki Transportation, Shōtarō Iwakiri, took measures to improve the landscape, such as planting phoenix palm trees. Additionally, he conducted large-scale tourism development. As a result, from the 1950s to the 1960s, there was a honeymoon boom among Japanese people visiting Nichinan Kaigan Quasi-National Park. In 1974, the Obi Castle Restoration Project was initiated to attract tourists from Nichinan Coast to Obi, with the cooperation of the people from Nichinan City and the Obi district. As a result of these efforts, the Obi district was designated as a national important traditional buildings group preservation district in 1977, the first in Kyushu.

Main items of the Obi Castle Restoration Project

- 1976 - Restored the Shintoku domain school.
- 1978 - Reconstructed the Ōtemon gate of the Castle and built an Obi historical museum.
- 1979 - Constructed the Matsuo-no-Maru palace in shoin-zukuri style at the castle.

The total project cost for these project was 518 million yen, of which 220 million yen was covered through donations from citizens, residents of the city, and willing companies.

== Maintenance and preservation ==
The Important Traditional Buildings Group Preservation District is protected by a regulation that preserves the historical landscape. However, while the entire castle town covers approximately 100 hectares, the preservation district comprises only 19.8 hectares of that area. Approximately 80 hectares, the majority of the Jōkamachi, is subject to the regulations and standards of the City Planning Act and the Building Standards Act. However, this means that any construction that meets these regulations and standards is allowed, even if it does not fit in with the historical landscape. This could lead to the loss of historical buildings and streets with historical atmosphere outside the preservation district. Furthermore, the surrounding hills, slopes with greenery, and the clear stream of the Sakatani River are also considered part of the integrated landscape with the Obi Castle town, and it is believed that they should be preserved together. Even historical buildings that are considered to be of high value and are scattered throughout the castle town may be left abandoned as vacant houses, and it is necessary to spend a lot of money to preserve and renovate them. If those buildings are privately owned, it becomes difficult for the owners to maintain and manage them. The aging rate of residents in the Obi district exceeds 40%, leading to an increase in vacant houses and empty lots. Moreover, in areas outside the National Important Preservation District for Groups of Traditional Buildings, historical buildings that have not been evaluated until today are also becoming vacant and facing an increasing number of demolitions. As a result, there are cases of new constructions that do not fit in with the surrounding historical landscape. In addition, Buddhist temples and shrines scattered outside the District for Groups of Traditional Buildings are sometimes left without a manager. Furthermore, electricity poles in the streets of the castle town are a factor that spoils the landscape.

Obi district is a representative historical townscape in Nichinan City and a tourist destination. However, the conservation of the landscape outside the National Important Traditional Buildings Group Preservation District, as well as the problem of vacant houses and vacant land, are major challenges for town planning in the district with a view to improving the historical landscape in the future.

== Bibliography ==
- Itsuzaburo Noguchi; Kokichi Yanagi, eds. (1979). 宮崎の文化遺産 (宮崎の自然と文化 5) (in Japanese). 宮崎日日新聞社.
- Cultural Property Research Committee, ed. (1961). 古城をめぐる 続 (in Japanese). 人物往来社.
- Tetsuo Ōga, ed. (1981). 探訪ブックス 城9 九州の城 (in Japanese). Shogakukan.
- 月間 観光（190） (in Japanese). Japan Tourist Association. 1982.
