= Obi Station =

Railway station in Nichinan, Miyazaki Prefecture, Japan

Obi Station 飫肥駅
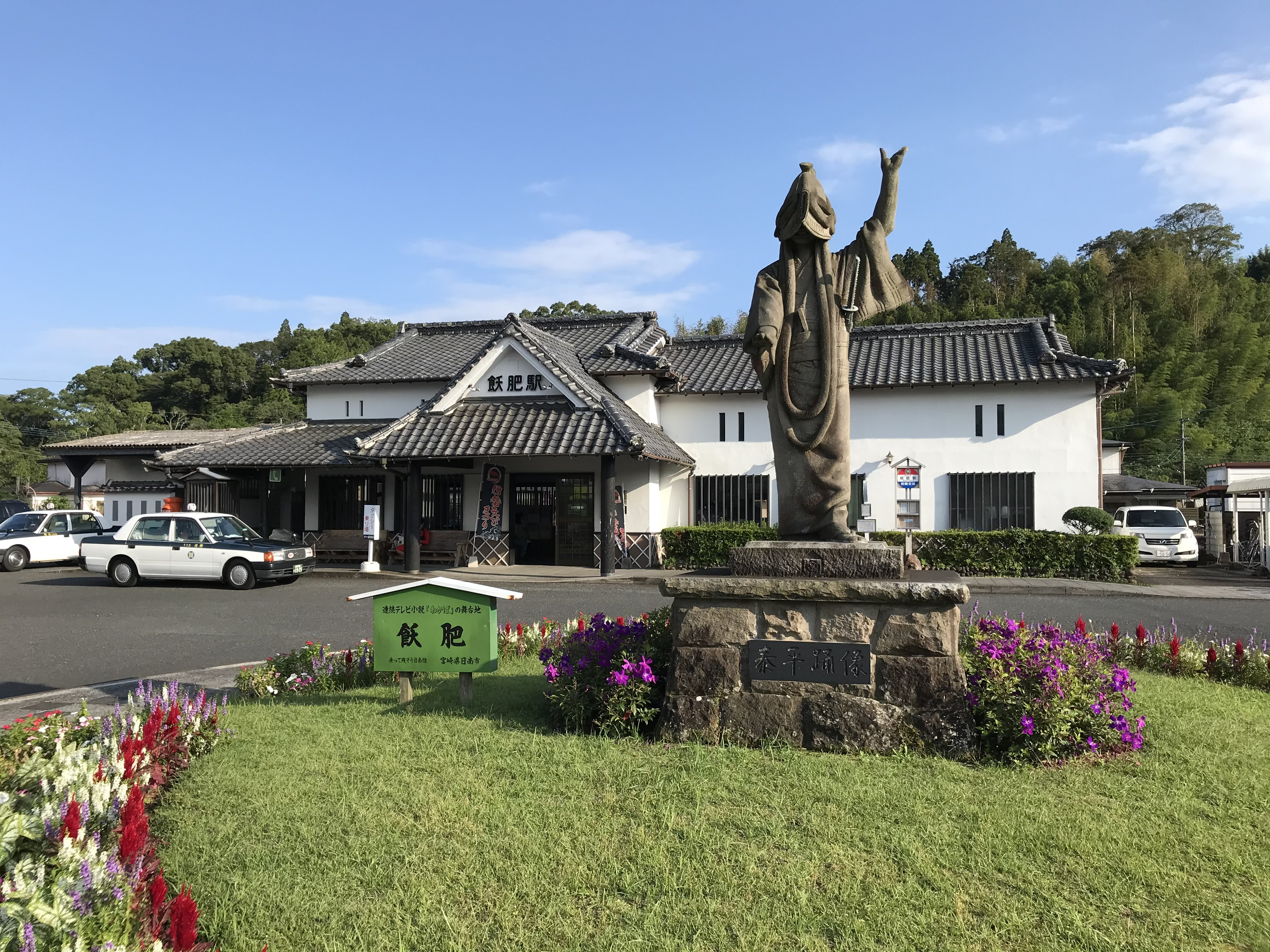
- Obi Station in 2020

General information
- Location: 1-chome Hoshikura, Nichinan-shi, Miyazaki-ken 889-2533; Japan
- Coordinates: 31°37′40″N 131°21′43″E
- Operator: JR Kyushu
- Line: ■ Nichinan Line
- Distance: 39.8 km from Minami-Miyazaki
- Platforms: 1 island platform
- Tracks: 2
- Connections: Bus stop

Construction
- Structure type: At grade
- Parking: Available
- Cycle facilities: Bike shed

Other information
- Status: Staffed ticket window (outsourced)
- Website: Official website

History
- Opened: 28 October 1941

Passengers
- FY2016: 355 daily
- Rank: 285th (among JR Kyushu stations)

Services
Preceding station	JR Kyushu	Following station
Uchinoda towards Minami-Miyazaki	Nichinan Line	Nichinan towards Shibushi
Location
- Location within Miyazaki Prefecture Location within Japan

Obi Station (飫肥駅, Obi-eki) is a passenger railway station located in the city of Nichinan, Miyazaki Prefecture, Japan. It is operated by JR Kyushu and is on the Nichinan Line.

== Lines ==
The station is served by the Nichinan Line and is located 39.8 km from the starting point of the line at Minami-Miyazaki.

== Layout ==
The station consists of an island platform serving two tracks at grade. The station building is built in traditional Japanese style to resemble a castle with white plaster namako walls. It houses a staffed ticket window and a waiting area. Access to the island platform is by means of a level crossing. A bike shed and parking are available at the station forecourt.

Management of the passenger facilities at the station has been outsourced to the JR Kyushu Tetsudou Eigyou Co., a wholly owned subsidiary of JR Kyushu specialising in station services. It staffs the ticket booth which is equipped with a POS machine but does not have a Midori no Madoguchi facility.

=== Platforms ===
1	■ ■ Nichinan Line	for Miyazaki and Minami-Miyazaki
2	■ ■ Nichinan Line	for Aburatsu and Shibushi

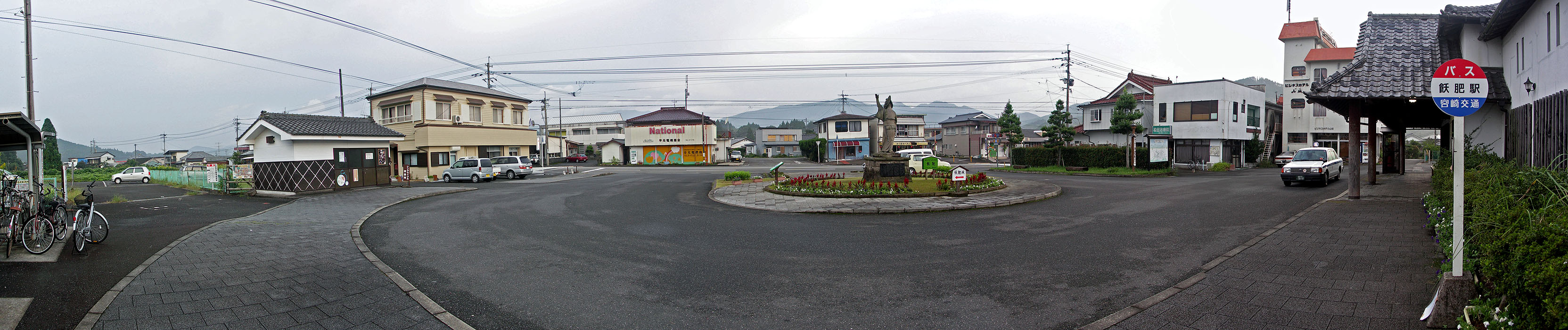
A view of the station forecourt

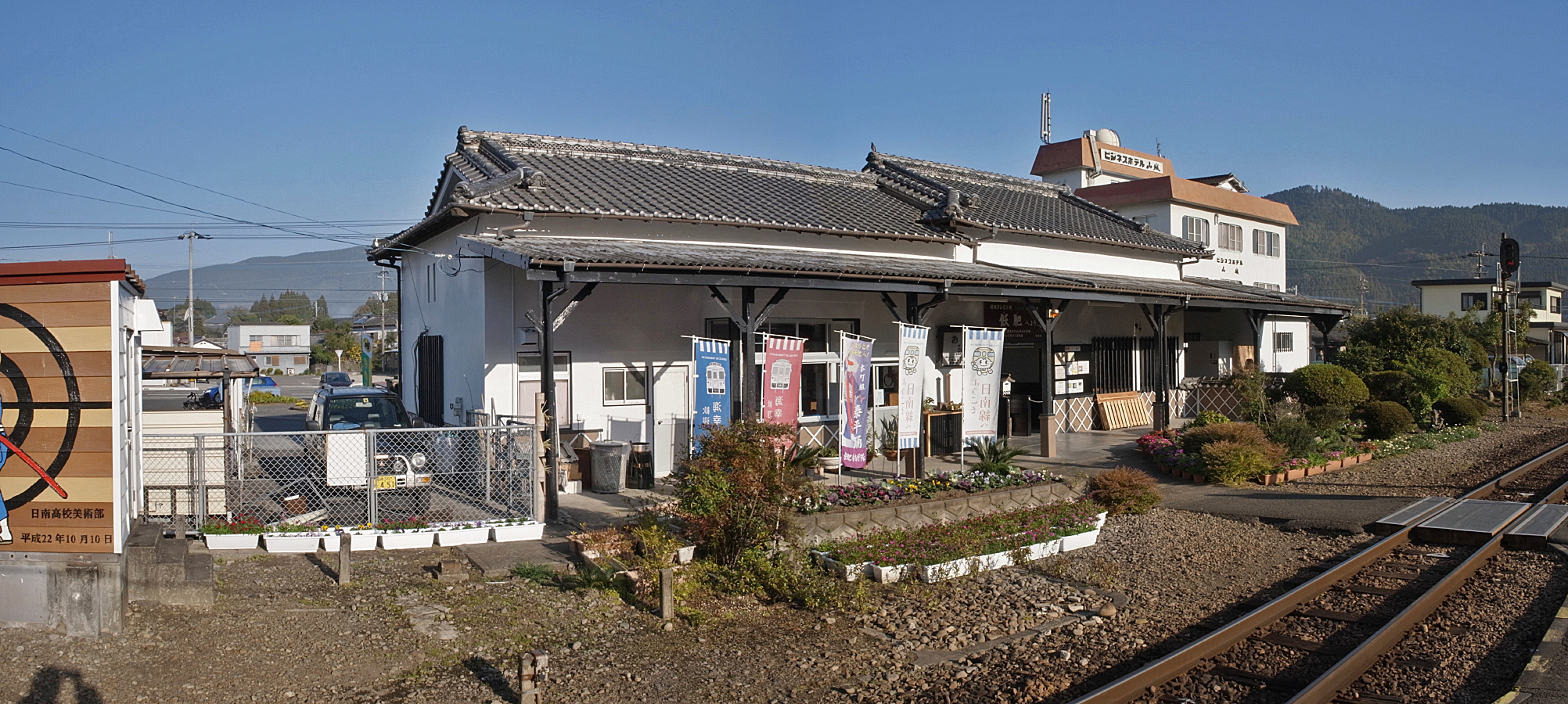
Rear of the station building. Note the level crossing.

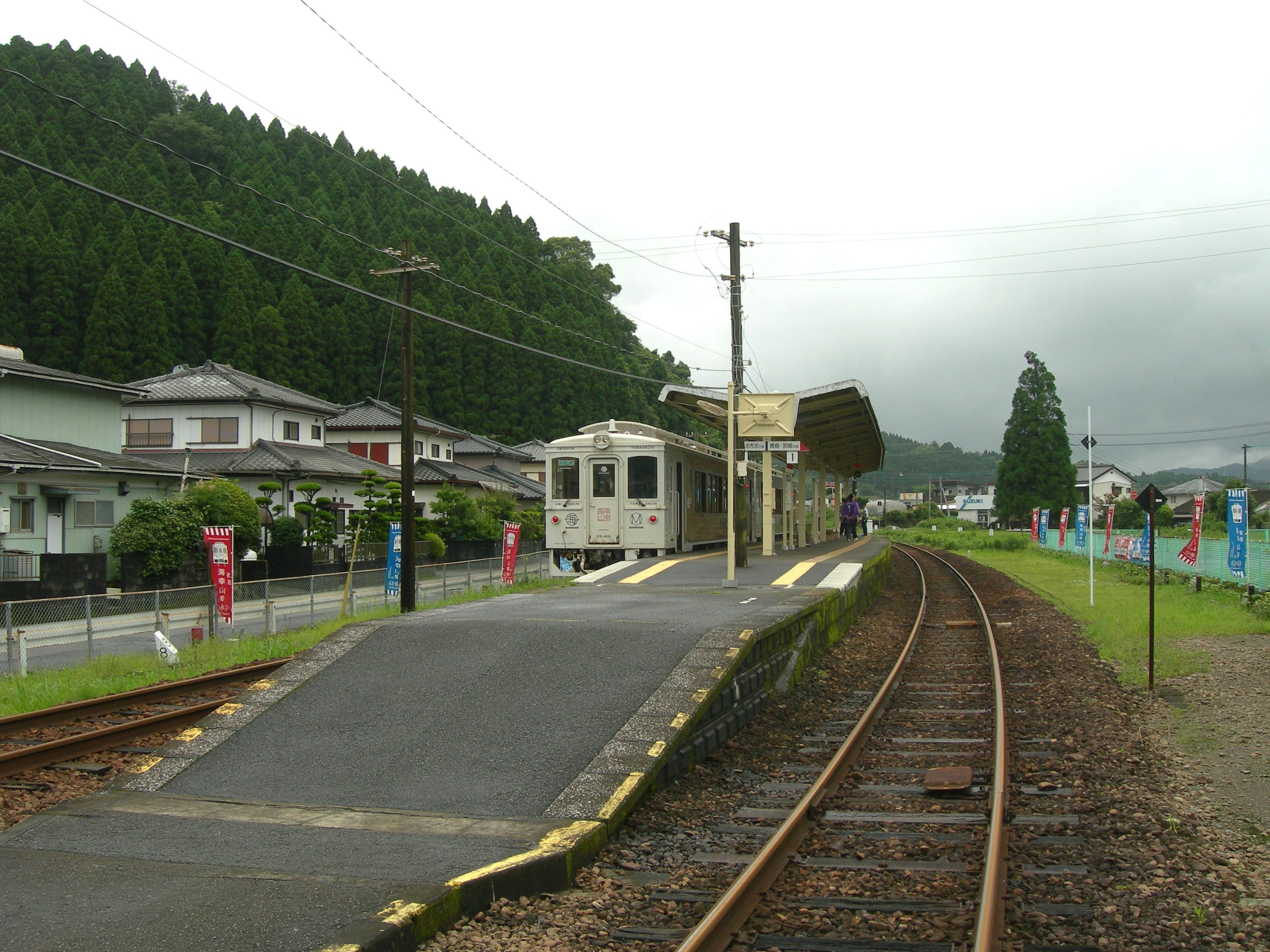
A view of the platform and tracks.

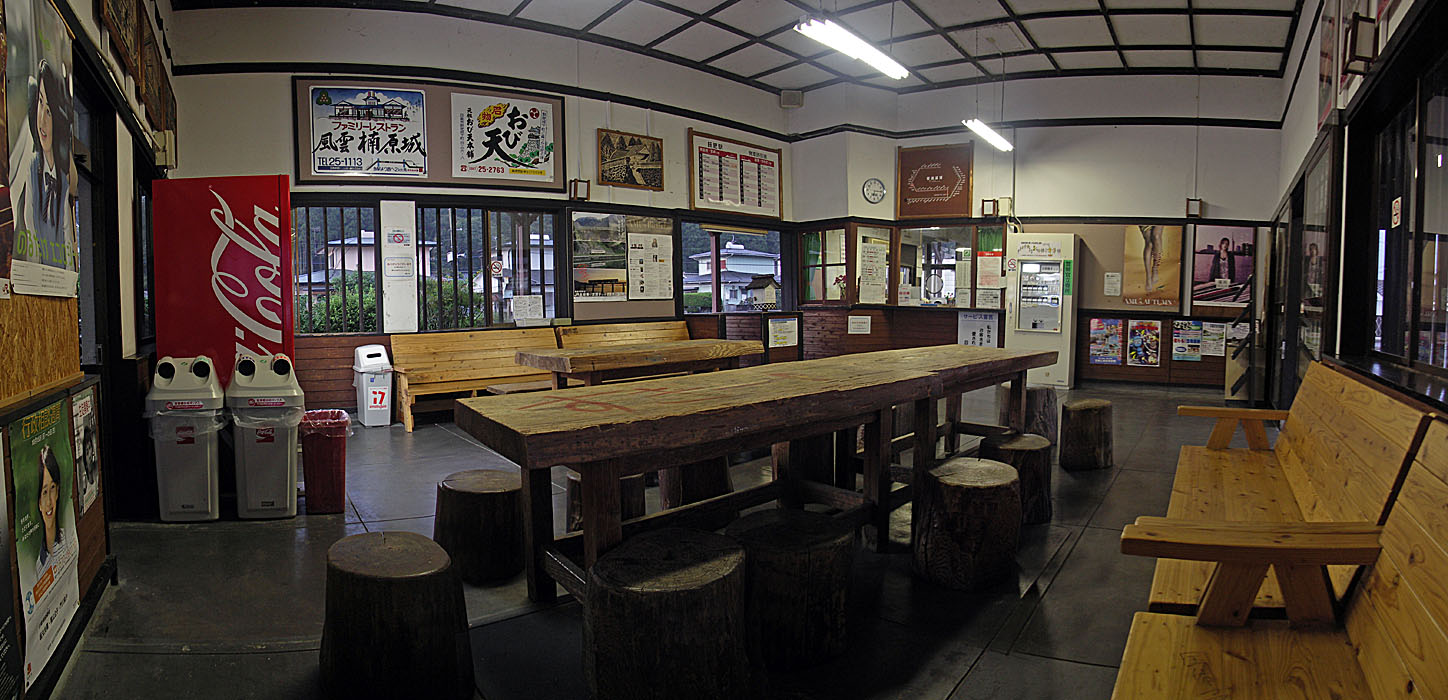
The interior of the station building.

== History ==
Japanese Government Railways (JGR) had opened the Shibushi Line from Nishi-Miyakonojō to Sueyoshi (now closed) in 1923. By 1925, the line had been extended eastwards to the east coast of Kyushu at Shibushi. The line was then extended northwards in phases, reaching Aburatsu by 1937. The track was extended further north with Kitagō opening as the northern terminus on 28 October 1941. Obi was one of several intermediate stations opened on the same day on the new track. Freight operations were discontinued in 1960. The route was designated the Nichinan Line on 8 May 1963. With the privatization of JNR on 1 April 1987, the station came under the control of JR Kyushu.

== Passenger statistics ==
In fiscal 2016, the station was used by an average of 355 passengers daily (boarding passengers only), and it ranked 285th among the busiest stations of JR Kyushu.

== Surrounding area ==
- Obi Castle
- Miyazaki Prefectural Nichinan High School
- Miyazaki Prefectural Nichinan Shintoku High School
- Nichinan City Hall Obi Branch

== See also ==
- List of railway stations in Japan
