= Aburatsu Station =

Railway station in Japan

Aburatsu Station 油津駅
- Aburatsu Station in 2020

General information
- Location: 2-chōme-13 Iwasaki, Nichinan-shi, Miyazaki-ken 887-0014; Japan
- Coordinates: 31°35′14″N 131°23′45″E
- Operator: JR Kyushu
- Line: ■ Nichinan Line
- Distance: 46.0 km from Minami-Miyazaki
- Platforms: 1 island platform
- Tracks: 2 + 1 passing loop

Construction
- Structure type: At grade

Other information
- Status: Kan'i itaku agent on site
- Website: Official website

History
- Opened: 19 April 1937

Passengers
- FY2016: 148 daily

Services
Preceding station	JR Kyushu	Following station
Nichinan towards Minami-Miyazaki	Nichinan Line	Ōdōtsu towards Shibushi
Location
- Location within Miyazaki Prefecture Location within Japan

Aburatsu Station (油津駅, Aburatsu-eki) is a passenger railway station located in the city of Nichinan, Miyazaki Prefecture, Japan. It is operated by JR Kyushu and is on the Nichinan Line.

== Lines ==
The station is served by the Nichinan Line and is located 46.0 km from the starting point of the line at Minami-Miyazaki.

== Layout ==
The station consists of an island platform serving two tracks at grade with a passing loop running on the west side. The station building is a wooden structure built in western style. It houses a waiting area and a ticket window. The station is not staffed by JR Kyushu but some types of tickets are available from a kan'i itaku agent on site who manages the ticket window.

=== Platforms ===
1, 2	■ ■ Nichinan Line	for Miyazaki and Minami-Miyazaki for Nangō and Shibushi

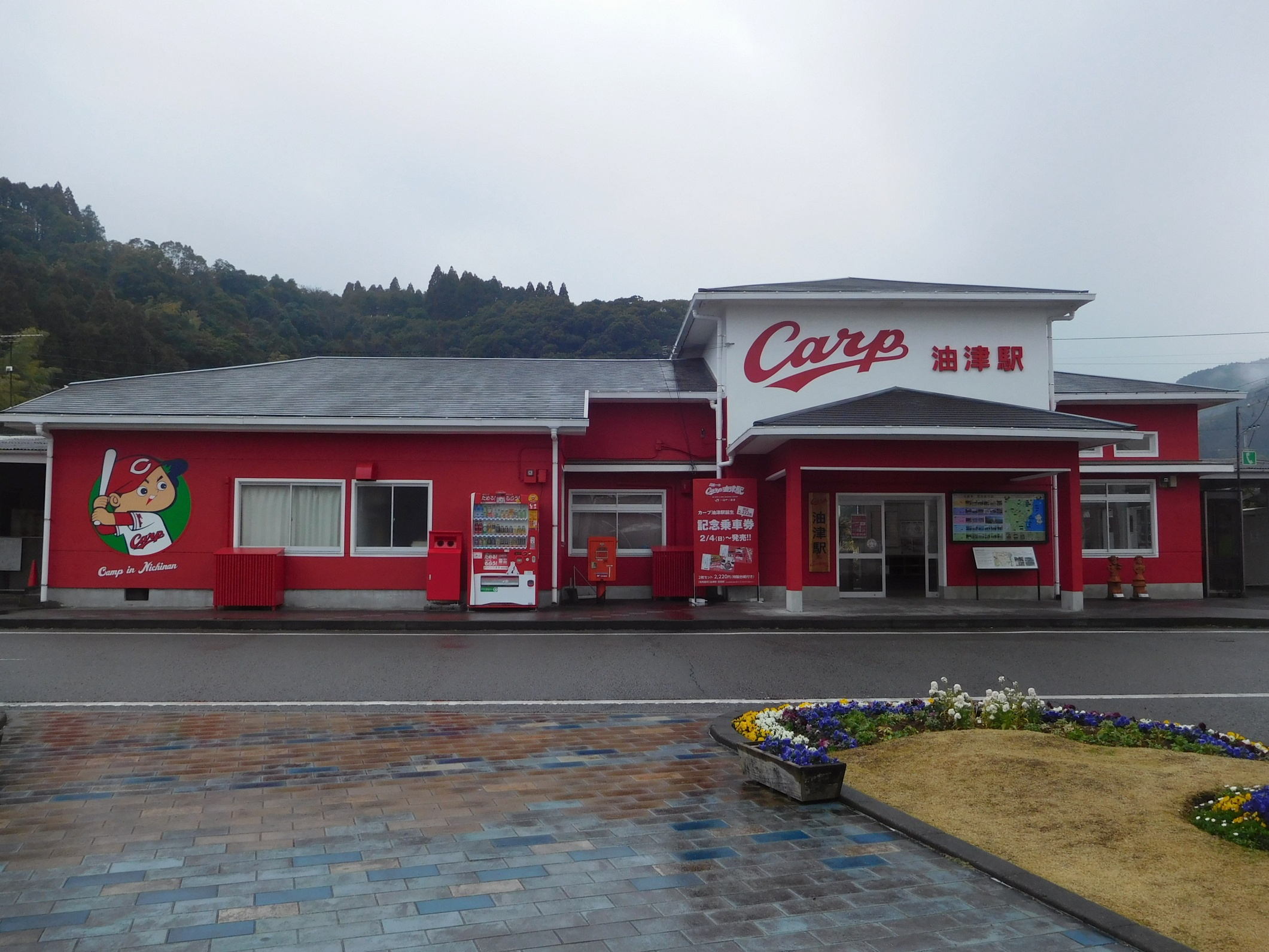
The station building in 2018, in the colour scheme of the Hiroshima Toyo Carp baseball team, paid with a crowd funding project by fans.

== History ==
Japanese Government Railways (JGR) had opened the Shibushi Line from Nishi-Miyakonojō to Sueyoshi (now closed) in 1923. By 1925, the line had been extended eastwards to the east coast of Kyushu at Shibushi. The line was then extended northwards in phases, reaching Ōdōtsu by 1936. The track was extended further north with Aburatsu opening as the northern terminus on 19 April 1937. It became a through-station on 28 October 1941 when the track was extended to Kitagō. The route was designated the Nichinan Line on 8 May 1963. Freight operations were discontinued in 1982 and baggage handling in 1985. With the privatization of JNR on 1 April 1987, the station came under the control of JR Kyushu.

== Passenger statistics ==
In fiscal 2016, the station was used by an average of 148 passengers (boarding only) per day.

== Surrounding area ==
- Aburatsu Port
- Nichinan City Aburatsu Elementary School
- Nichinan City Sakuragaoka Elementary School
- Nichinan City Aburatsu Junior High School

== See also ==
- List of railway stations in Japan
