= Udo Jingū =

Shinto shrine in Miyazaki Prefecture, Japan

Udo-jingū 鵜戸神宮
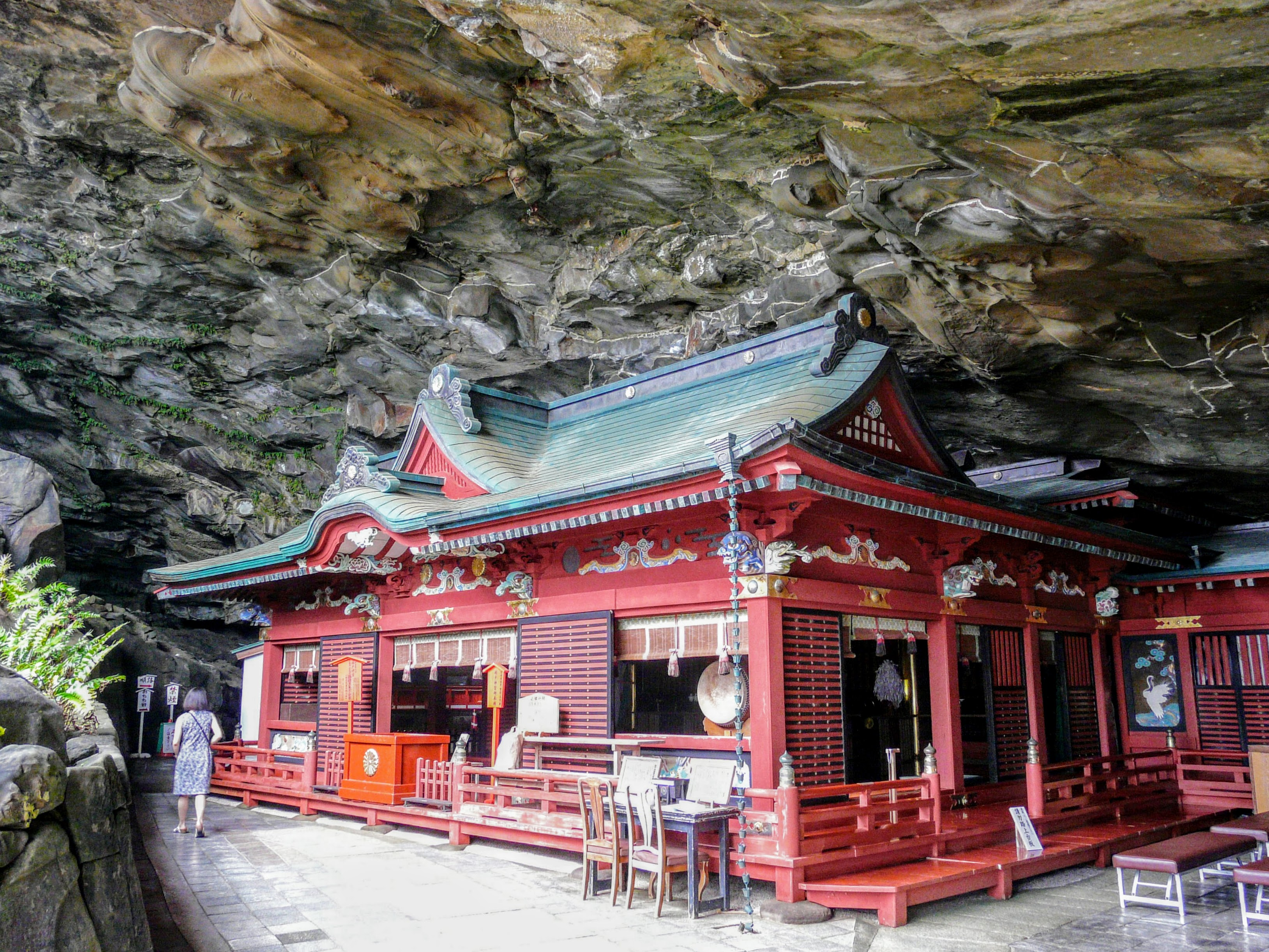
- The honden (main shrine)

- Location within Japan

Religion
- Affiliation: Shinto
- Deity: Ugayafukiaezu; Amaterasu; Ame-no-oshihomimi; Ninigi-no-Mikoto; Hoori; Emperor Jimmu

Location
- Location: 3232, Miyaura, Nichinan, Miyazaki 887-0101
- Interactive map of Udo-jingū 鵜戸神宮
- Coordinates: 31°39′01″N 131°28′00″E

Website
- www.udojingu.com

Udo-jingū (鵜戸神宮) is a Shinto shrine in Nichinan, Miyazaki prefecture, Japan, south of Aoshima. It is the mythical birthplace of Emperor Jimmu's father Ugayafukiaezu. According to shrine legends, it is the place where the sea goddess Toyotamahime, the mother of said Ugayafukiaezu, built a birth-hut from the feathers of a cormorant. Other gods venerated here are Yamasachihiko (alias Hohodemi alias Hoori, Jinmu's grandfather), Amaterasu, Amenooshihomimi, Ninigi-no-Mikoto, and Emperor Jimmu. While the original myth includes a tragic divorce of Ugayafukiaezu's parents, the shrine is popular with young couples hoping for easy childbirth and a happy marriage.

== Local characteristics ==
Udo shrine is in a cave in the side of the cliff, near the Nichinan coast of Miyazaki. The honden, or main shrine, is in a cavern with a view of the ocean.

In the cave is the ochichi iwa, or "breast stone," a dripping stone which is said to have fed the kami Ugayafukiaezu, father of the first emperor of Japan, when his mother returned to the sea. The shrine sells a candy made from the water of this stone, mizuame, a kind of taffy.

In the slight distance of the cavern is a rocky island with two peaks. Attendees can purchase small clay balls and attempt to toss them between the peaks for good luck.
