= Ōdōtsu Station =

Railway station in Nichinan, Miyazaki Prefecture, Japan

Ōdōtsu Station 大堂津駅
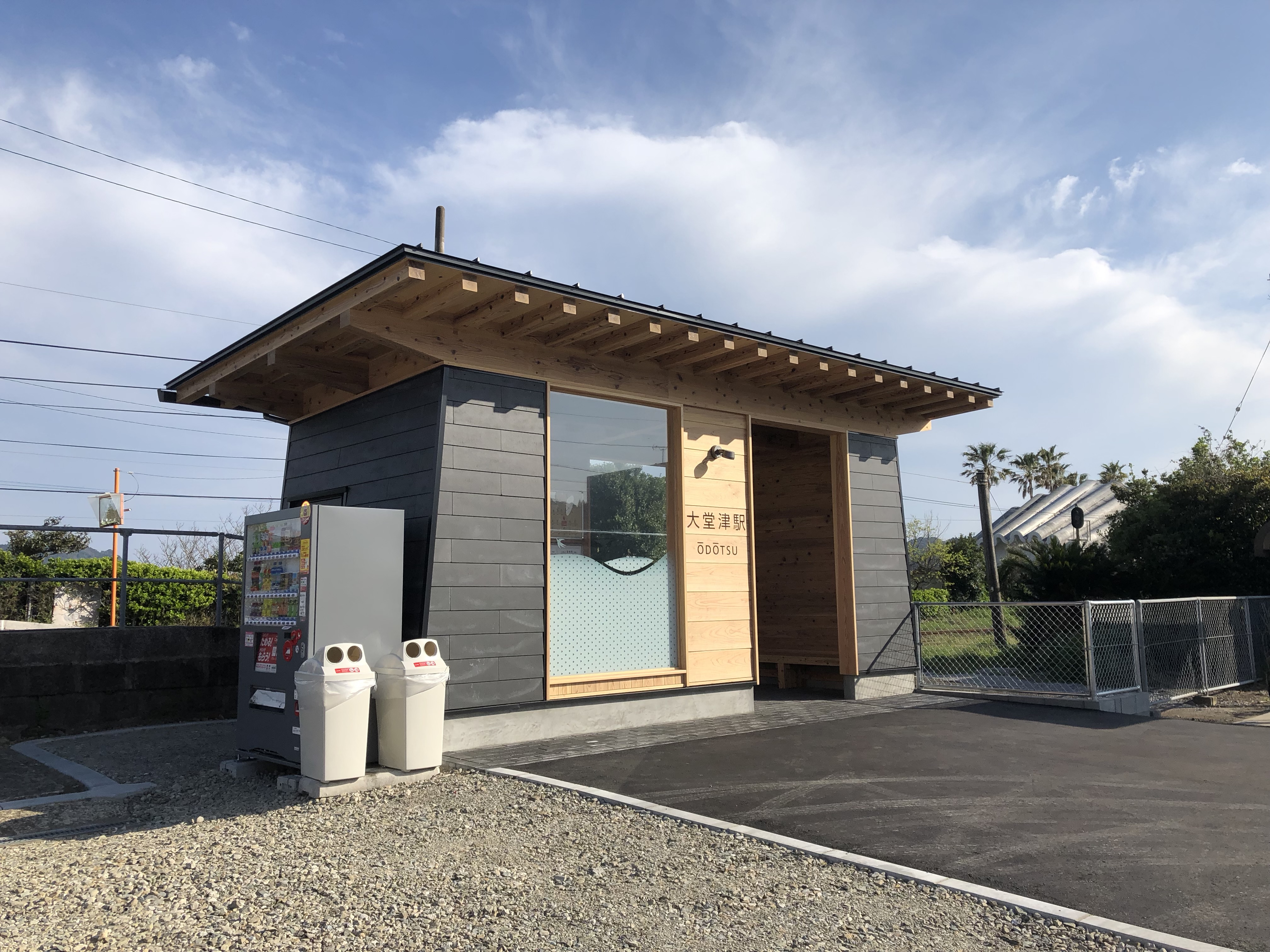
- Ōdōtsu Station in 2019

General information
- Location: 3-chōme-8 Ōdōtsu, Nichinan-shi, Miyazaki-ken 889-3141; Japan
- Coordinates: 31°33′25″N 131°22′55″E
- Operator: JR Kyushu
- Line: ■ Nichinan Line
- Distance: 50.3 km from Minami-Miyazaki
- Platforms: 2 side platforms
- Tracks: 2

Construction
- Structure type: At grade
- Cycle facilities: Bike shed

Other information
- Status: Unstaffed
- Website: Official website

History
- Opened: 1 March 1936

Passengers
- FY2016: 34 daily

Services
Preceding station	JR Kyushu	Following station
Aburatsu towards Minami-Miyazaki	Nichinan Line	Nangō towards Shibushi
Location
- Location within Miyazaki Prefecture Location within Japan

Ōdōtsu Station (大堂津駅, Ōdōtsu-eki) is a passenger railway station located in the city of Nichinan, Miyazaki Prefecture, Japan. It is operated by JR Kyushu and is on the Nichinan Line.

== Lines ==
The station is served by the Nichinan Line and is located 50.3 km from the starting point of the line at Minami-Miyazaki.

== Layout ==
The station consists of two side platforms serving two tracks at grade. The station building is a traditional Japanese style wooden structure with a tiled roof. It is unstaffed and serves only as a waiting room. Access to the opposite side platform is by means of a level crossing. A bike shed is available at the station forecourt.

=== Platforms ===
1	■ ■ Nichinan Line	for Aburatsu and Miyazaki
2	■ ■ Nichinan Line	for Nangō and Shibushi

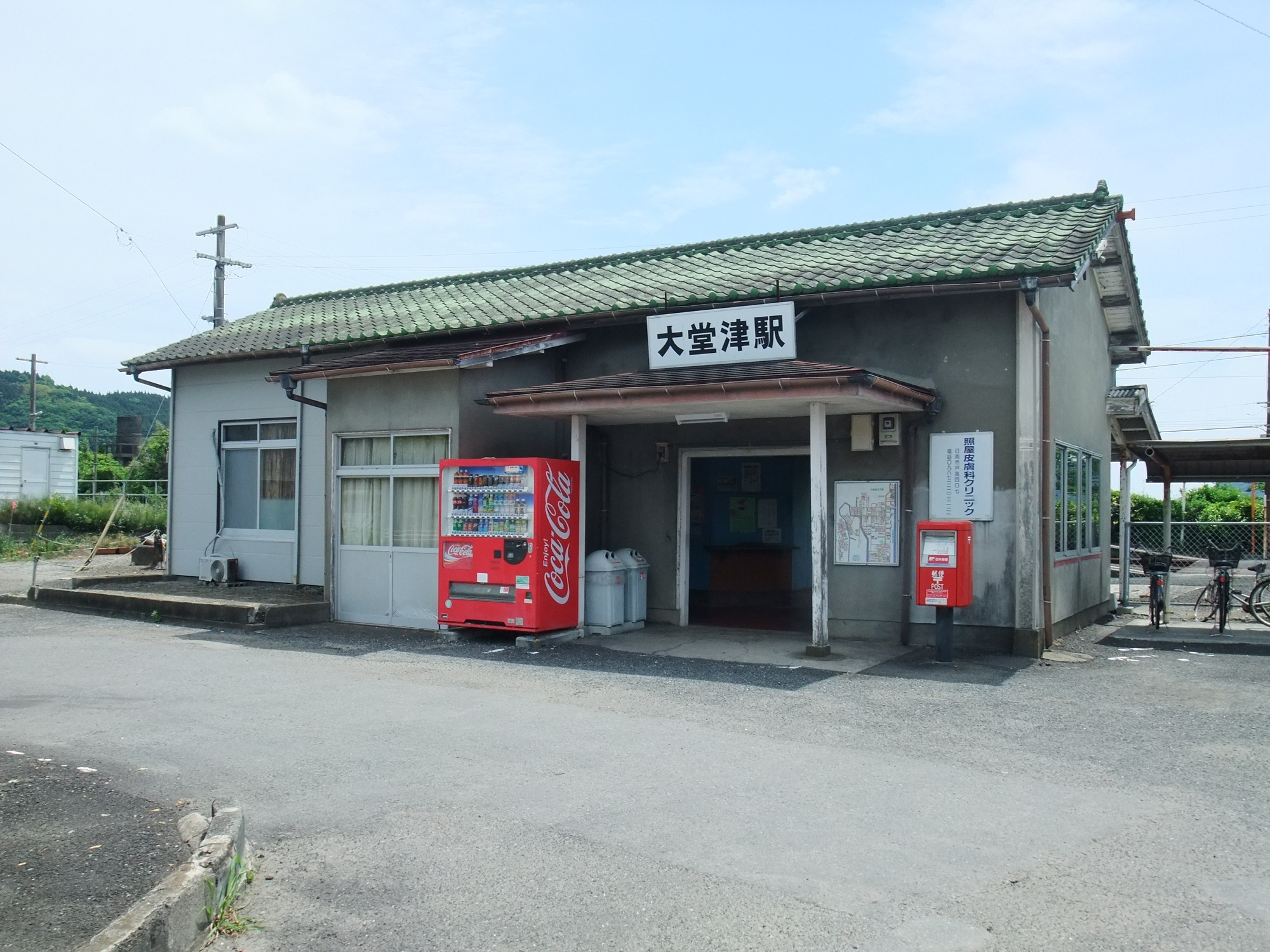
Station building in 2014

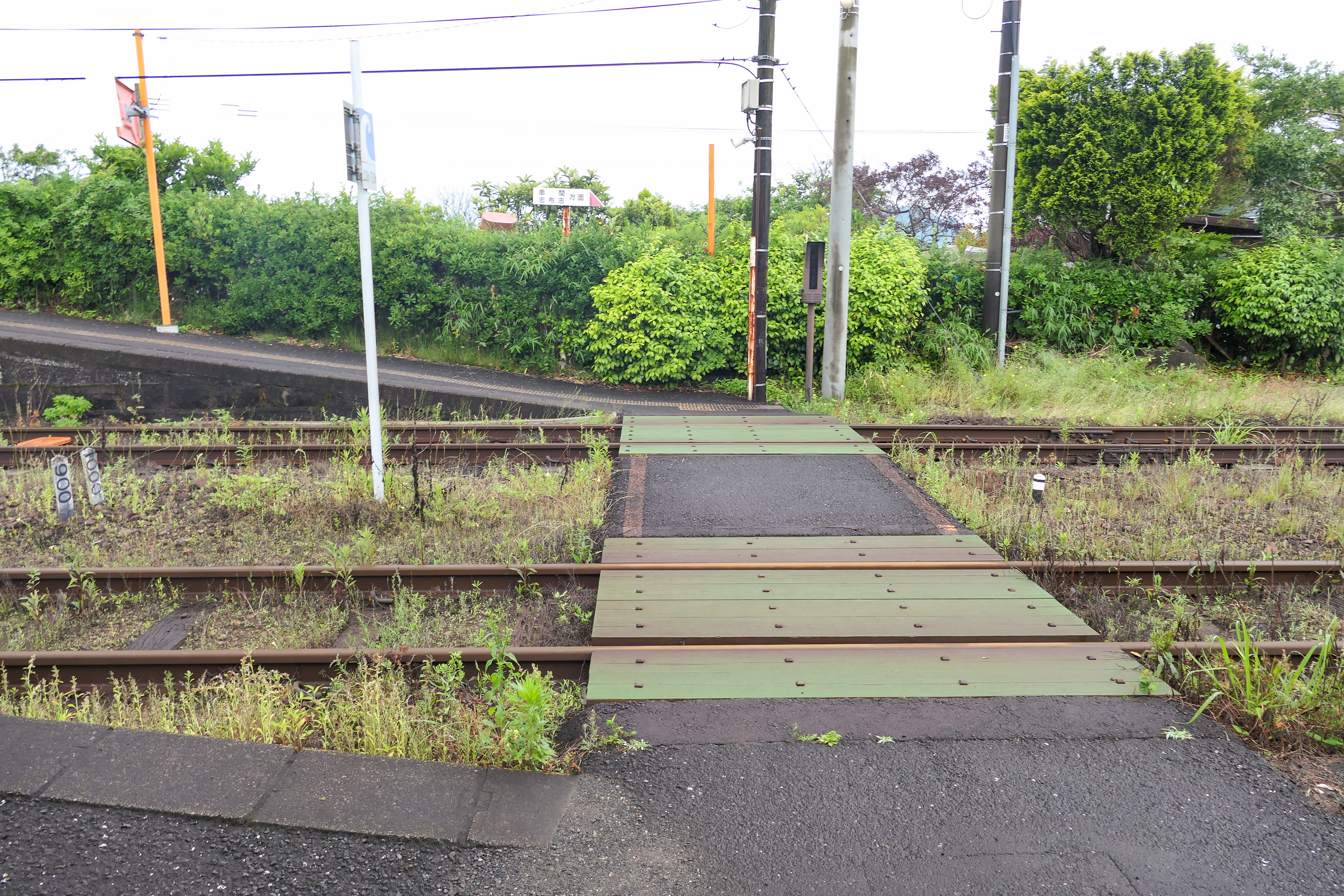
level crossing.

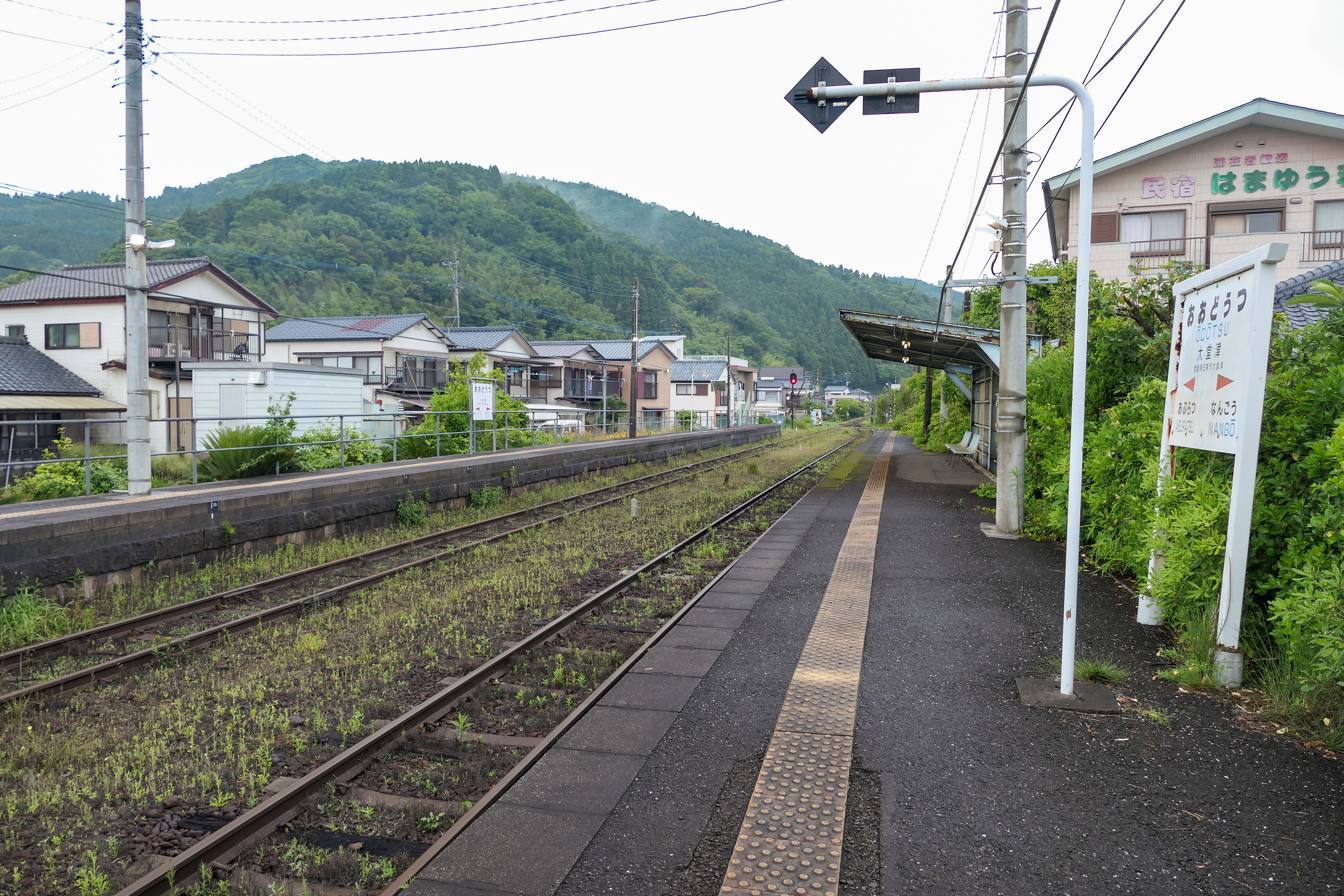
A view of the platform and tracks.

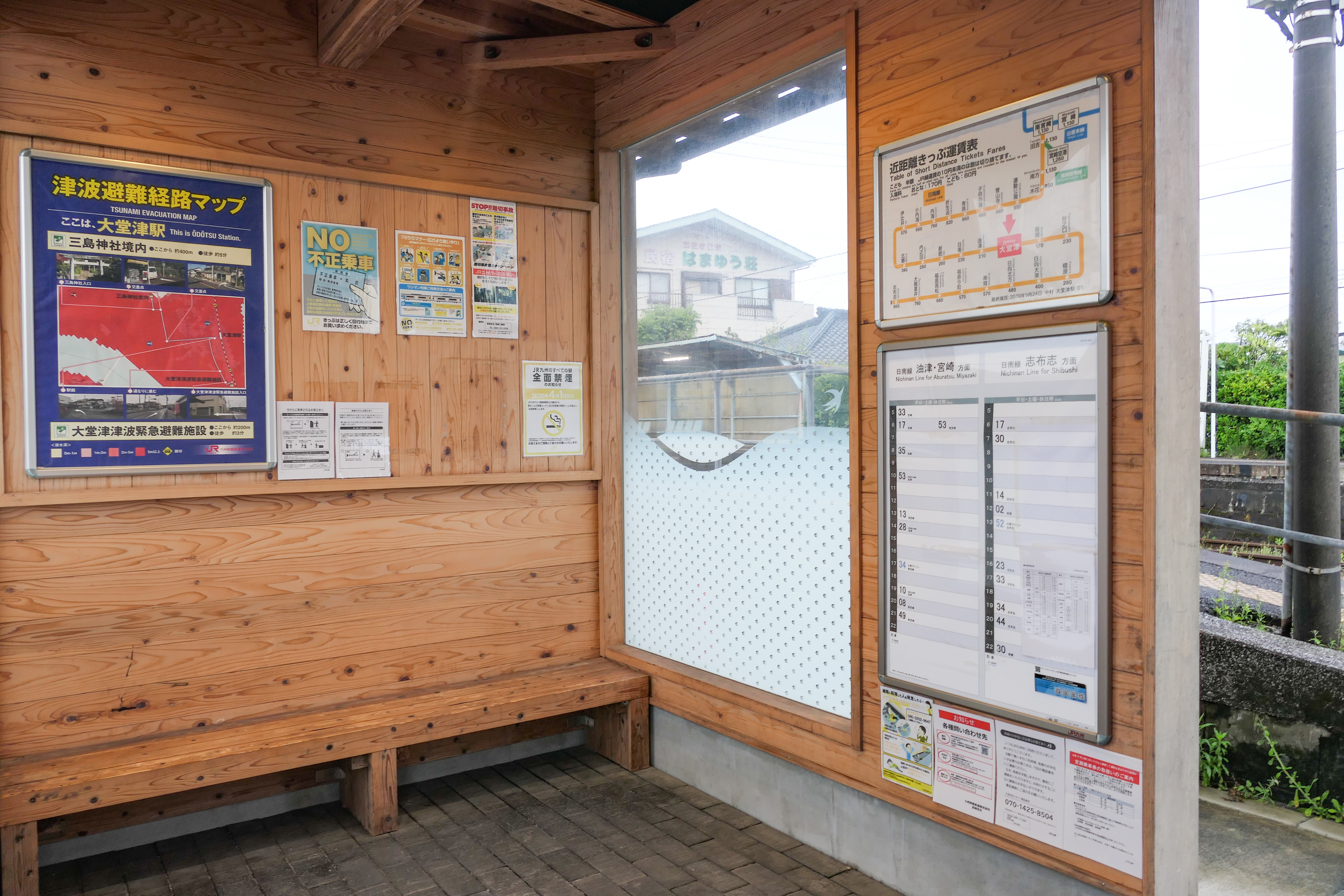
The interior of the station building.

== History ==
Japanese Government Railways (JGR) had opened the Shibushi Line from Nishi-Miyakonojō to Sueyoshi (now closed) in 1923. By 1925, the line had been extended eastwards to the east coast of Kyushu at Shibushi. The line was then extended northwards in phases, reaching Yowara by 1935. The track was extended further north with Ōdōtsu opening as the northern terminus on 1 March 1936. It became a through-station on 19 April 1937 when the track was extended to Aburatsu. Freight operations were discontinued in 1960. The route was designated the Nichinan Line on 8 May 1963. With the privatization of JNR on 1 April 1987, the station came under the control of JR Kyushu.

== Passenger statistics ==
In fiscal 2016, the station was used by an average of 34 passengers (boarding only) per day.

== Surrounding area ==
- Nichinan City Ōdōtsu Elementary School
- Ōdōtsu Beach

== See also ==
- List of railway stations in Japan
