= Nangō Station =

Railway station in Nichinan, Miyazaki Prefecture, Japan

Nangō Station 南郷駅
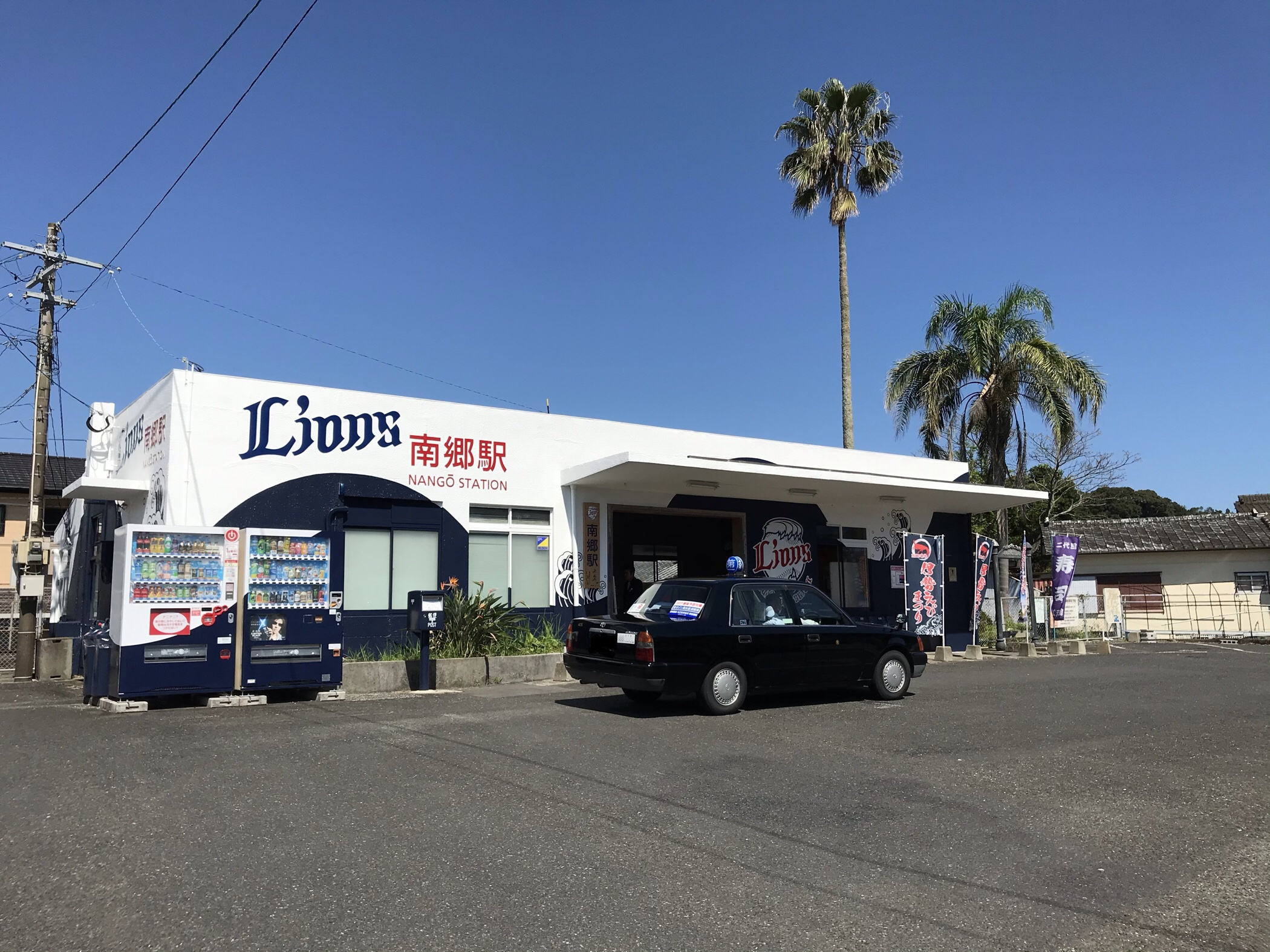
- Nangō Station in 2020

General information
- Location: Nangocho Higashimachi, Nichinan-shi, Miyazaki-ken 889-3207; Japan
- Coordinates: 31°32′09″N 131°22′22″E
- Operator: JR Kyushu
- Line: ■ Nichinan Line
- Distance: 53.0 km from Minami-Miyazaki
- Platforms: 1 side platform
- Tracks: 1 + 1 siding

Construction
- Structure type: At grade

Other information
- Status: Kan'i itaku agent on site
- Website: Official website

History
- Opened: 1 March 1936

Passengers
- FY2016: 167 daily

Services
Preceding station	JR Kyushu	Following station
Ōdōtsu towards Minami-Miyazaki	Nichinan Line	Taninokuchi towards Shibushi
Location
- Location within Miyazaki Prefecture Location within Japan

Nangō Station (南郷駅, Nangō-eki) is a passenger railway station located in the city of Nichinan, Miyazaki Prefecture, Japan. It is operated by JR Kyushu and is on the Nichinan Line.

== Lines ==
The station is served by the Nichinan Line and is located 53.0 km from the starting point of the line at Minami-Miyazaki.

== Layout ==
The station consists of a side platform serving a single track at grade with a siding. The station building is a simple concrete block structure which houses a ticket window and a waiting area. The station is not staffed by JR Kyushu but some types of tickets are available from a kan'i itaku agent on site who manages the ticket window.

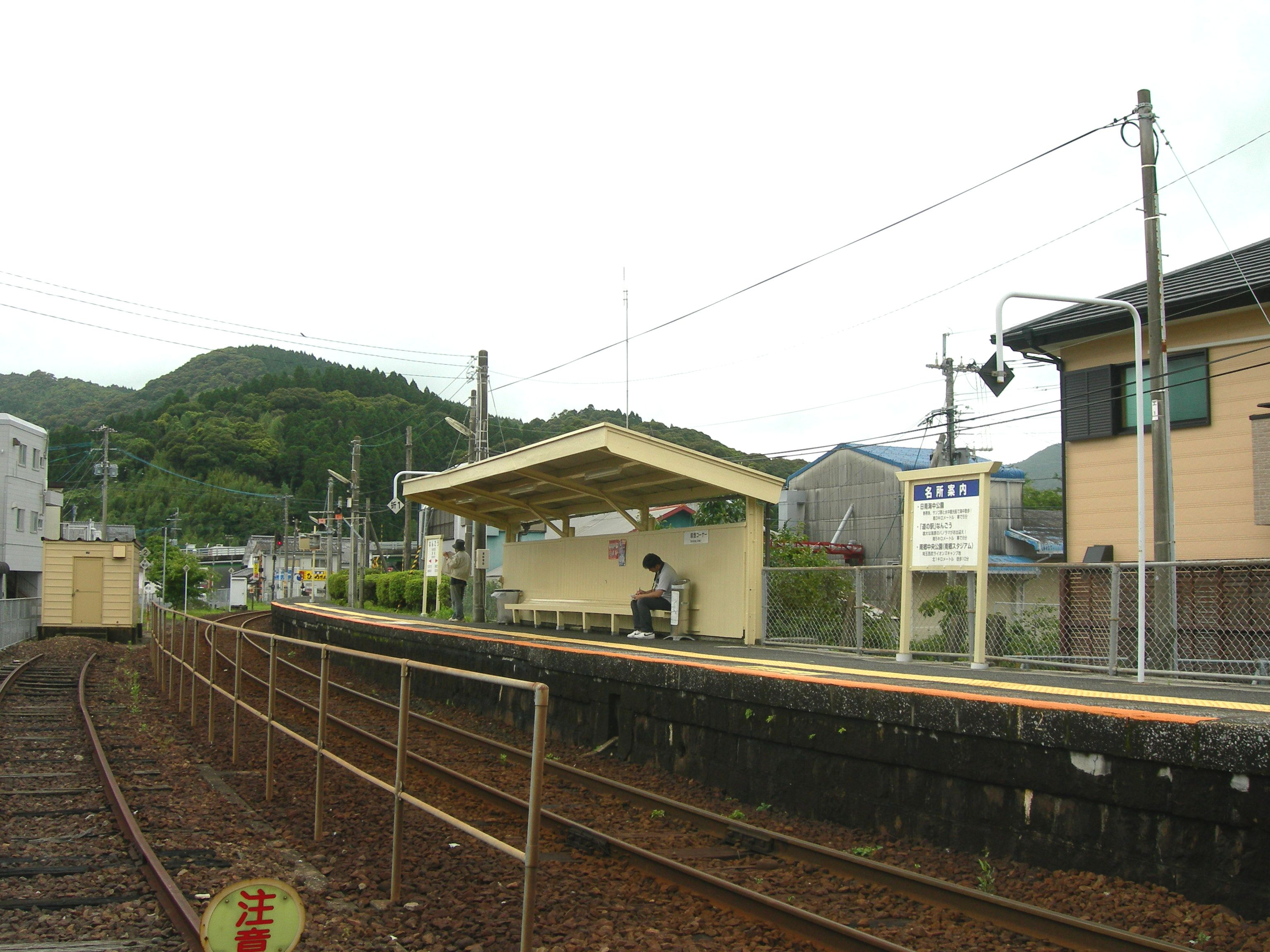
The platform and track. The siding can be seen to the left.

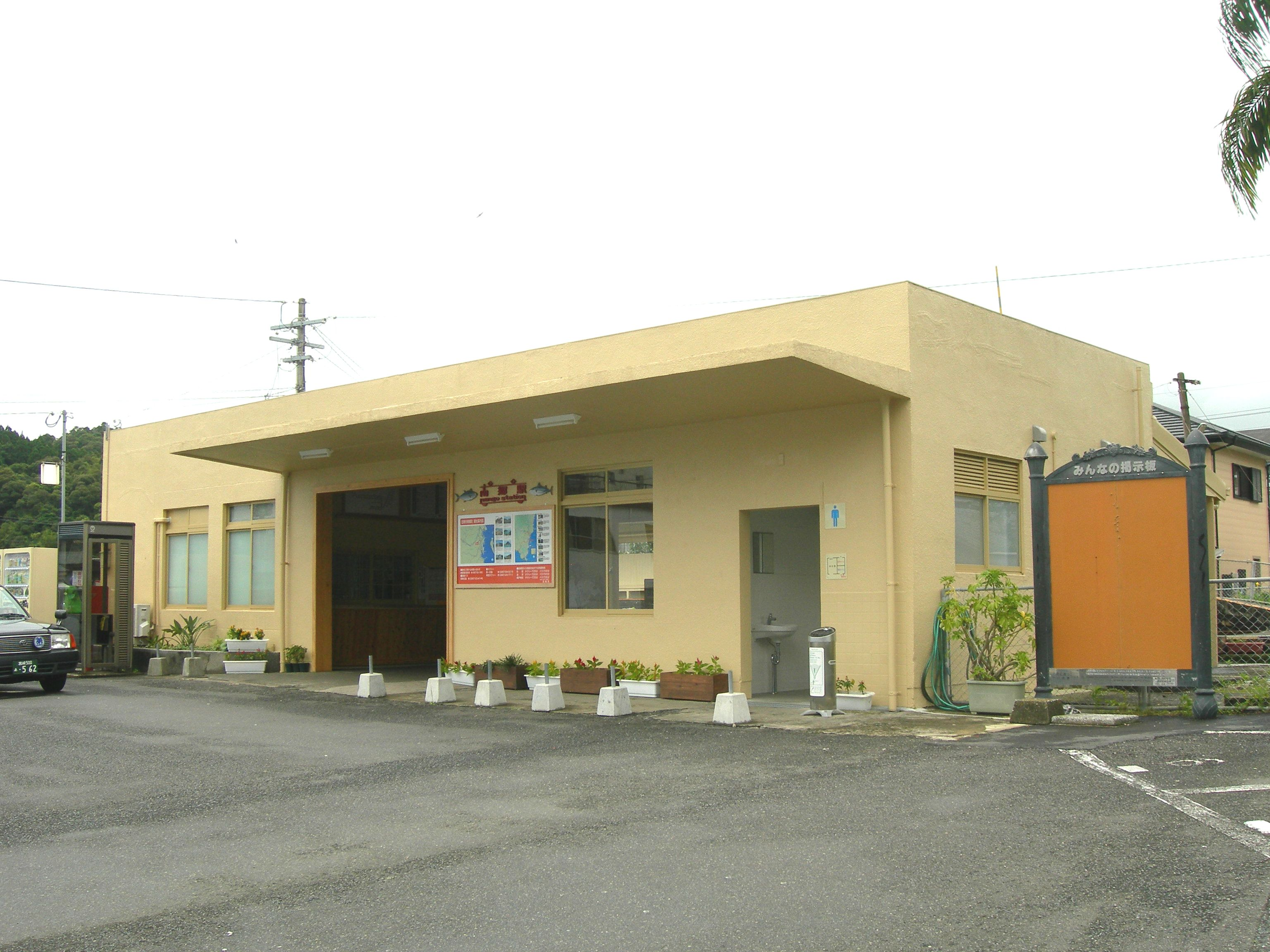
Station building in 2010

== History ==
Japanese Government Railways (JGR) had opened the Shibushi Line from Nishi-Miyakonojō to Sueyoshi (now closed) in 1923. By 1925, the line had been extended eastwards to the east coast of Kyushu at Shibushi. The line was then extended northwards in phases, reaching Yowara by 1935. The track was extended further north with Ōdōtsu opening as the northern terminus on 1 March 1936. On the same day, Nangō opened as an intermediate station the new track. The route was designated the Nichinan Line on 8 May 1963. Freight operations were discontinued in 1971 and baggage handling in 1985. With the privatization of JNR on 1 April 1987, the station came under the control of JR Kyushu.

== Passenger statistics ==
In fiscal 2016, the station was used by an average of 167 passengers (boarding only) per day.

== Surrounding area ==
- Nichinan City Nangō Town General Branch (formerly Nangō Town Hall)
- Nichinan City Nangō Elementary School
- Nichinan City Nangō Junior High School

== See also ==
- List of railway stations in Japan
