= Nichinan Kaigan Quasi-National Park =

Quasi-National Park in Japan

- 日南海岸国定公園
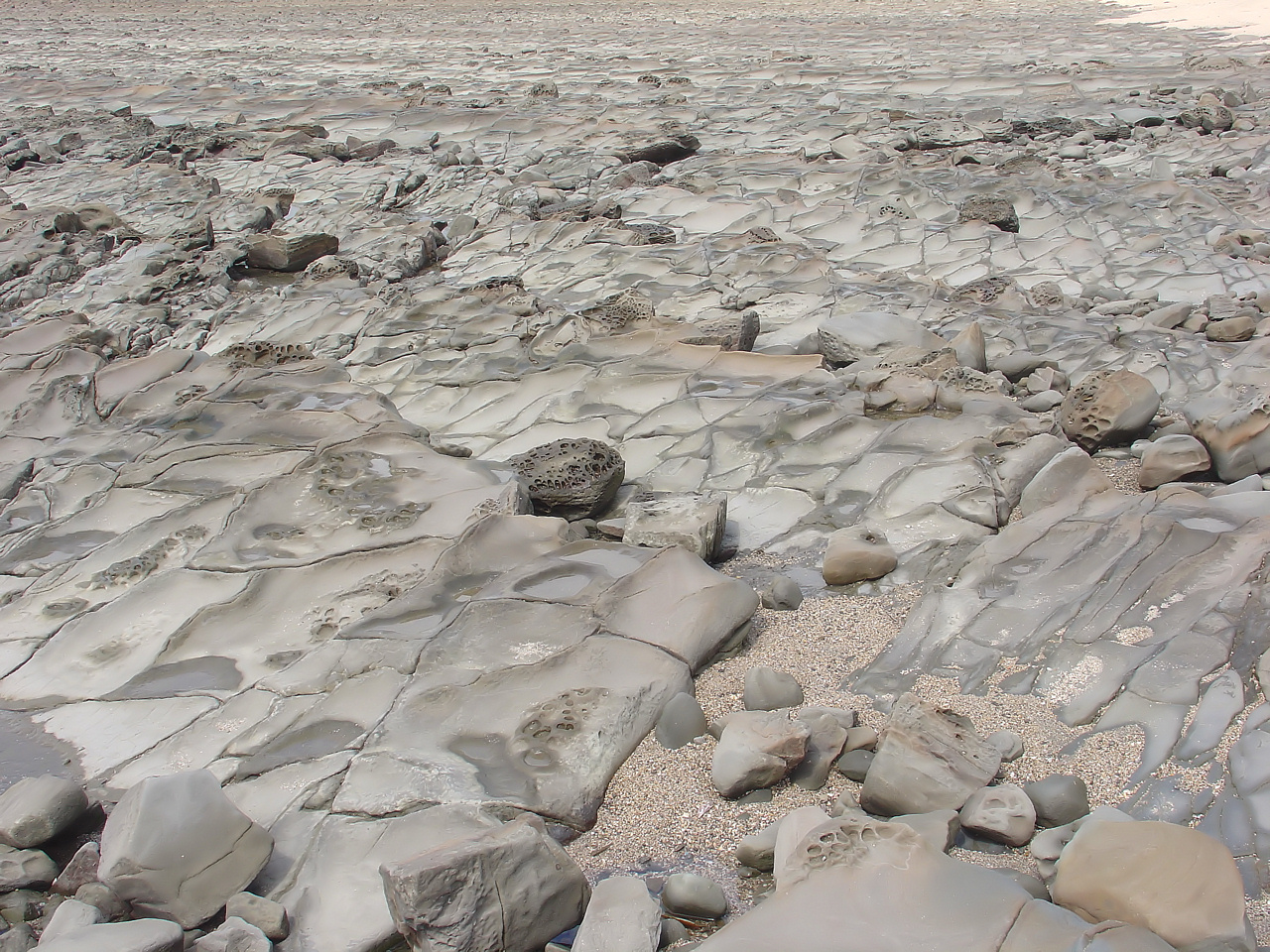
- "The Ogre's Washboard"

- Location within Japan
- Location: Kagoshima/Miyazaki Prefecture, Japan
- Coordinates: 31°34′44″N 131°25′48″E
- Area: 45.42 km^{2} (17.54 sq mi)
- Established: June 1, 1955

Nichinan Kaigan Quasi-National Park (日南海岸国定公園, Nichinan Kaigan Kokutei Kōen) is a Quasi-National Park on the coast of Kagoshima Prefecture and Miyazaki Prefecture, Japan. It was founded on 1 June 1955 and has an area of 45.42 km^{2} (17.54 sq mi).

== See also ==
- List of national parks of Japan
