= List of cities in Miyazaki Prefecture by population =

The following list sorts all cities (including towns) in the Japanese prefecture of Miyazaki with a population of more than 5,000 according to the 2015 Census. As of October 1, 2015, 21 places fulfill this criterion and are listed here. This list refers only to the population of individual cities, towns and villages within their defined limits, which does not include other municipalities or suburban areas within urban agglomerations.

== List ==
The following table lists the 21 cities and towns in Miyazaki with a population of at least 5,000 on October 1, 2015, according to the 2015 Census. The table also gives an overview of the evolution of the population since the 1995 census.

Rank (2015)	Name	Status	2015	2010	2005	2000	1995
1	Miyazaki	City	401,138	400,583	395,593	392,178	384,391
2	Miyakonojō	City	165,029	169,602	170,955	171,812	174,054
3	Nobeoka	City	125,159	131,182	135,182	139,176	141,751
4	Hyūga	City	61,761	63,223	63,555	64,186	64,341
5	Nichinan	City	54,090	57,689	60,914	63,421	65,809
6	Kobayashi	City	46,221	48,270	49,820	51,697	52,828
7	Saito	City	30,683	32,614	34,087	35,381	36,331
8	Mimata	Town	25,404	24,800	24,545	24,056	22,941
9	Takanabe	Town	21,025	21,733	22,522	22,748	22,886
10	Kunitomi	Town	19,606	20,909	21,692	22,367	22,130
11	Ebino	City	19,538	21,606	23,079	24,906	25,872
12	Kushima	City	18,779	20,453	22,118	23,647	25,243
13	Kadogawa	Town	18,183	18,854	19,207	19,287	19,155
14	Shintomi	Town	17,373	18,092	18,608	19,058	18,037
15	Kawaminami	Town	16,109	17,009	17,323	17,630	18,053
16	Takachiho	Town	12,755	13,723	14,778	15,843	16,780
17	Tsuno	Town	10,391	11,137	11,811	12,321	12,618
18	Takaharu	Town	9,300	10,000	10,623	11,254	11,619
19	Aya	Town	7,345	7,224	7,478	7,596	7,419
20	Misato	Town	5,480	6,248	6,874	7,509	8,251
21	Kijō	Town	5,231	5,177	5,531	5,759	5,727
