= Osuzu Prefectural Natural Park =

Prefectural Natural Park in Miyazaki Prefecture, Japan

- 尾鈴県立自然公園
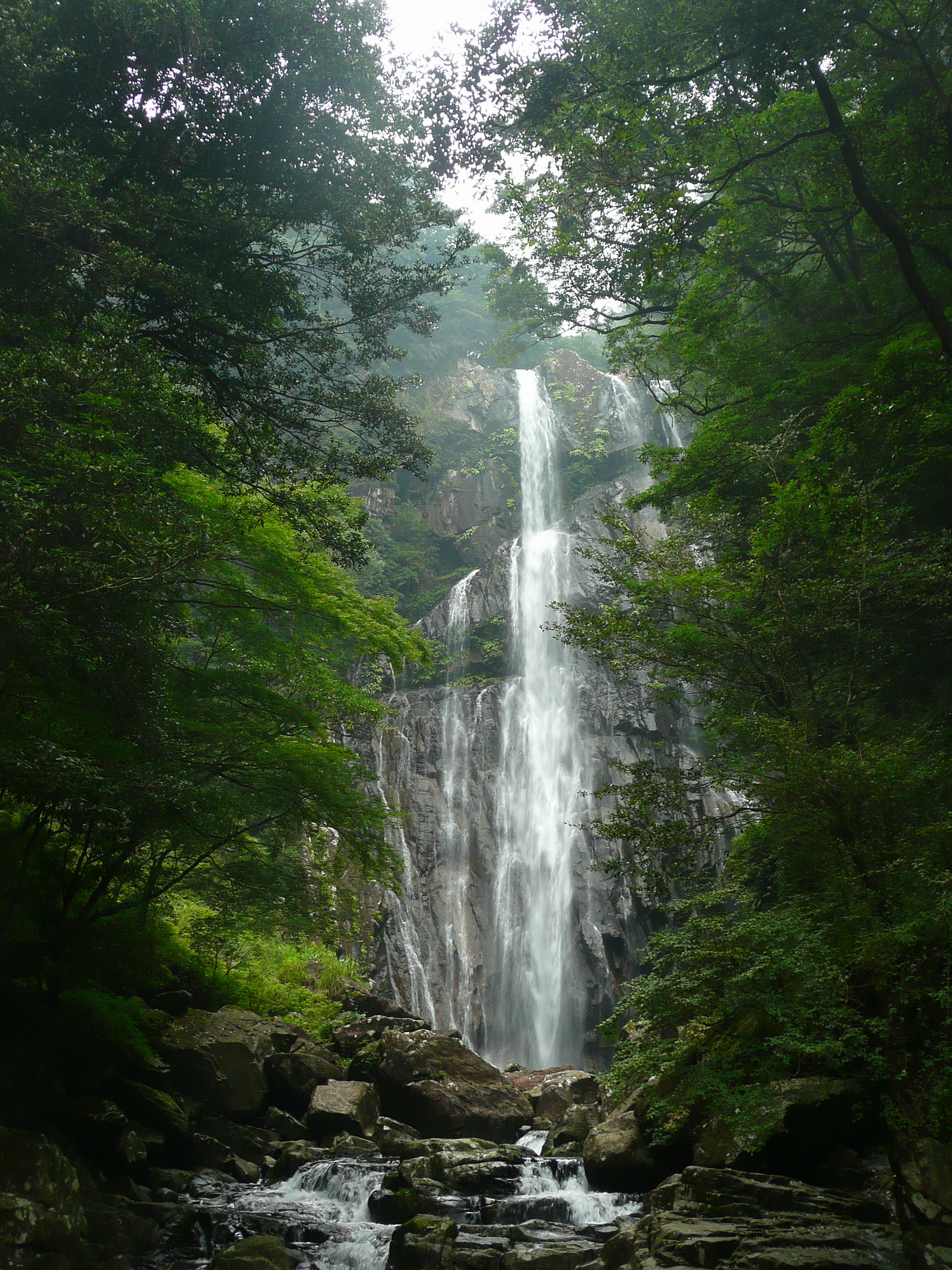
- Yatogi waterfall
- Interactive map of Osuzu Prefectural Natural Park
- Location: Miyazaki Prefecture, Japan
- Area: 133.01 km^{2} (51.36 sq mi)
- Established: 1 September 1958

Osuzu Prefectural Natural Park (尾鈴県立自然公園, Osuzu kenritsu shizen kōen) is a Prefectural Natural Park in central Miyazaki Prefecture, Japan. Established in 1958, the park is within the municipalities of Kawaminami, Kijō, and Tsuno. The area is celebrated for the Mount Osuzu (尾鈴山) group of waterfalls - which have been designated a Place of Scenic Beauty.

== See also ==
- National Parks of Japan
