= Kawaminami Kofun Cluster =

- 川南古墳群 (Japanese)
- Kawaminami Kofun Cluster Kawaminami Kofun Cluster (Japan)
- Interactive map of Kawaminami Kofun Cluster
- 32°10′24″N 131°29′48″E
- Type: Kofun
- Periods: Kofun period
- Location: Kawaminami, Miyazaki, Japan
- Region: Kyushu

History
- Built: c.4th to 6th century

Site notes
- Public access: Yes (no facilities)

Kawaminami Kofun Cluster (川南古墳群) is a group Kofun period burial mounds, located in the Nishibeppu neighborhood of the town of Kawaminami, Miyazaki on the island of Kyushu Japan. The tumulus cluster was collectively designated a National Historic Site of Japan in 1961.

== Overview ==
A group of ancient tombs located on the edge of the Kokkobaru plateau at an elevation of 50 to 60 meters on the left bank of the Komaru River, and on a plateau one step above the elevation of 80 meters. The cluster consists of 25 zenpō-kōhō-fun (前方後方墳), which are shaped like a keyhole, having one square end and one circular end, when viewed from above. one hōfun (方墳) rectangular tomb, and 25 enpun (円墳) round tombs within a narrow area of approximately 0.5 square kilometers. There are also several small circular tumuli and undesignated kofun that are known to have been destroyed, and the area designated as a historical site is limited to the portion containing tumuli that remain visible on the ground. As only a few surveys and archaeological excavations have been conducted, there is a considerable amount of surrounding undesignated area which probably contains more tumuli which remain undiscovered. Since the ratio of keyhole-shaped tombs in this group is extremely high, it is thought that the tumuli are not the graves of a single chieftain's family, but rather the grave areas of several influential clans over a fairly wide area. The tombs are broadly divided into five groups depending on their location. It is estimated that these tumuli were built between the 4th century and the end of the 6th century, and thus predate the tumuli at the Saitobaru Kofun Cluster. The largest tumulus in the group is Mound No. 39, which has a total length of 112 meters and is surrounded by a moat. It is the largest keyhole-shaped tumulus in the Komaru River basin.

From this site the Mochida Kofun Cluster is approximately 3.5 kilometers to the southeast, the Nyūtabaru Kofun Cluster is approximately 9 kilometers to the southwest, and the Saitobaru Kofun Cluster approximately 8 kilometers to the west-southwest. The site is approximately ten minutes by car from Takanabe Station on the JR Kyushu Nippō Main Line.

== See also ==
- List of Historic Sites of Japan (Miyazaki)
