= Higashi-Tsuno Station =

Railway station in Tsuno, Miyazaki Prefecture, Japan

Higashi-Tsuno Station 東都農駅
- Higashi-Tsuno Station in 2024.

General information
- Location: Kawakita, Tsuno-cho, Koyu-gun, Miyazaki-ken 889-120; Japan
- Coordinates: 32°17′25″N 131°34′55″E
- Operator: JR Kyushu
- Line: ■ Nippō Main Line
- Distance: 294.1 km from Kokura
- Platforms: 2 side platforms
- Tracks: 2

Construction
- Structure type: At grade
- Parking: Available
- Cycle facilities: Bike shed
- Accessible: No - platforms linked by footbridge

Other information
- Status: Unstaffed
- Website: Official website

History
- Opened: 21 August 1952

Passengers
- FY2016: 51 daily

Services
Preceding station	JR Kyushu	Following station
Tsuno towards Kagoshima	Nippō Main Line	Mimitsu towards Kokura
Location
- Location within Miyazaki Prefecture Location within Japan

Higashi-Tsuno Station (東都農駅, Higashi-Tsuno-eki) is a passenger railway station located in the town of Tsuno, Miyazaki, Japan. It is operated by JR Kyushu and is on the Nippō Main Line.

== Lines ==
The station is served by the Nippō Main Line and is located 294.1 km from the starting point of the line at Kokura. Only local trains stop at this station.

== Layout ==
The station consists of two side platforms serving two tracks at grade. There is no station building, only a simple shed has been provided on platform 1 as a waiting room for passengers. A bike shed is provided at the station forecourt which also has ample space for parking. Access to the opposite side platform is by means of a footbridge; however, this platform is used as a siding and in normal operations all trains use platform 1.

=== Platforms ===
1	■ ■ Nippō Main Line	for Nobeoka for Miyazaki
2	■ ■ Nippō Main Line	siding

== History ==
Japanese National Railways (JNR) opened the station on 21 August 1952 as an additional station on the existing track of the Nippō Main Line. Baggage handling was suspended in 1974 and the station became unattended at that time. With the privatization of JNR on 1 April 1987, the station came under the control of JR Kyushu.

== Passenger statistics ==
In fiscal 2016, the station was used by an average of 51 passengers (boarding only) per day.

== Surrounding area ==
- Japan National Route 10

== See also ==
- List of railway stations in Japan
