= Tsuno Shrine =

Shinto shrine in Miyazaki Prefecture, Japan

Tsuno Shrine 都農神社
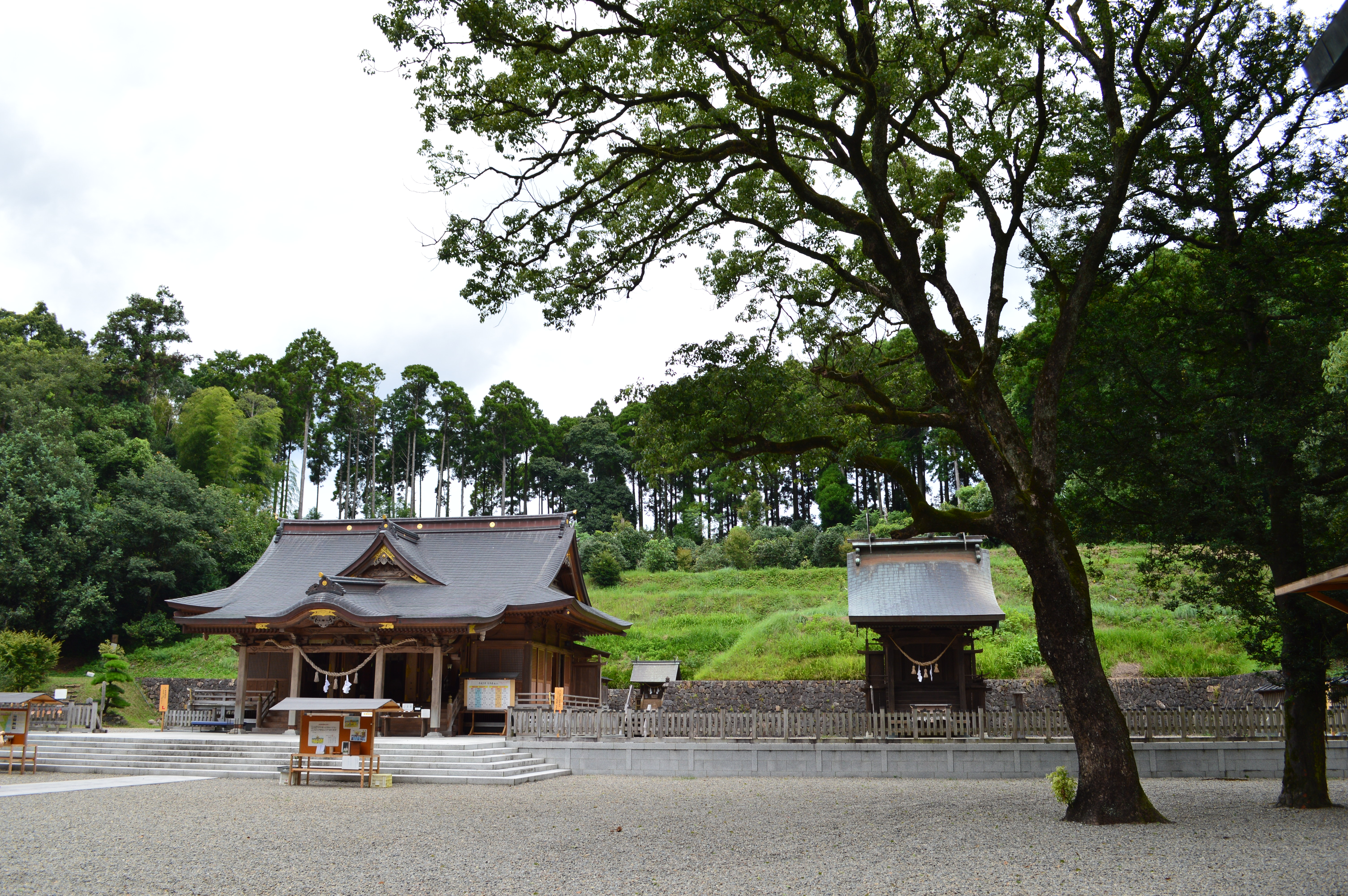
- Tsuno Shrine

- Location within Miyazaki Prefecture Location within Japan

Religion
- Affiliation: Shinto
- Deity: Ōkuninushi
- Festival: December 5

Location
- Location: 13,294 Kawakita, Tsuno-cho, Koyo-gun, Miyazaki-ken 502-0071 Japan
- Interactive map of Tsuno Shrine 都農神社
- Coordinates: 32°15′47.2″N 131°33′31.2″E

Website
- Official website

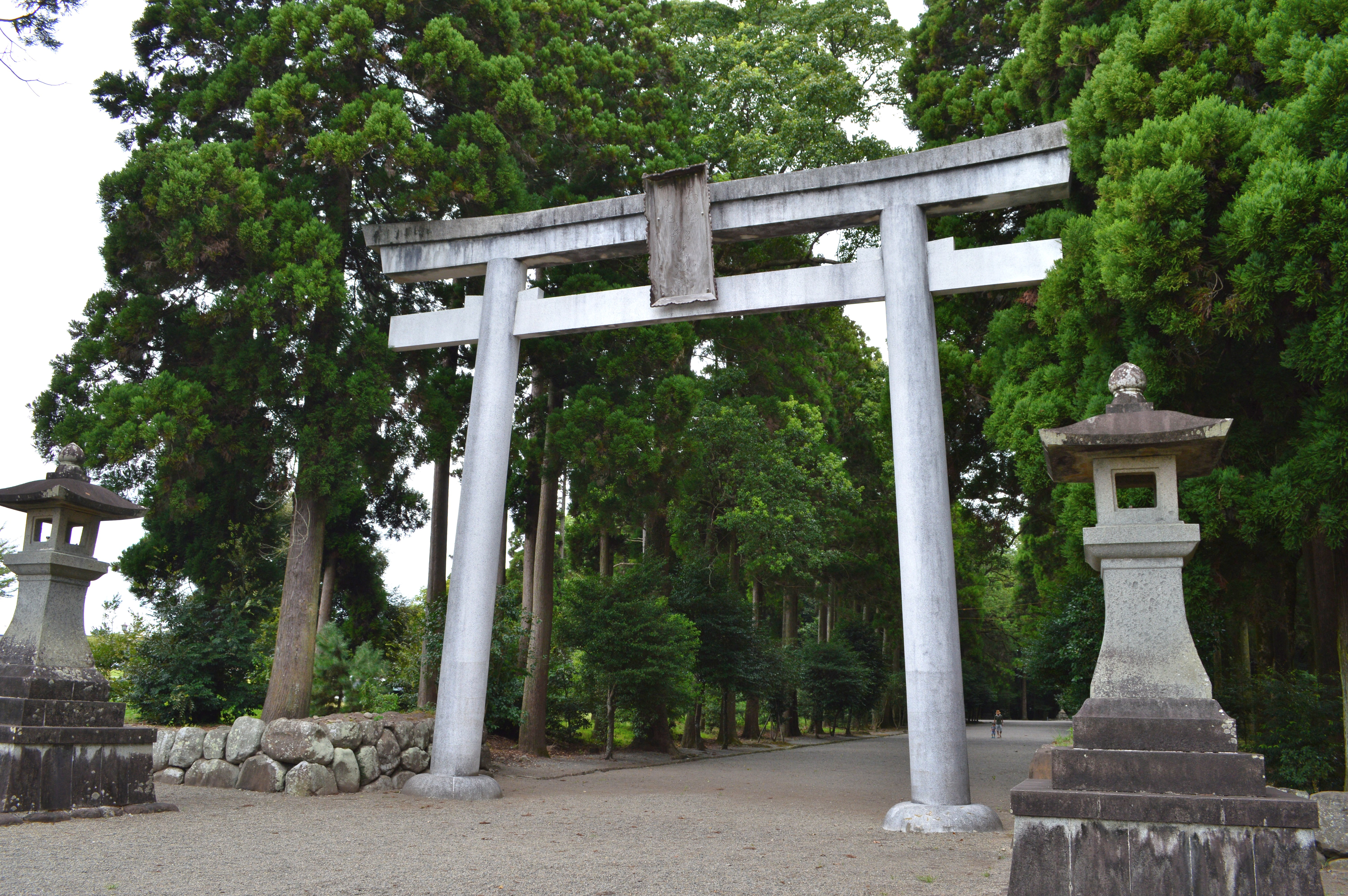
Torii

Tsuno Shrine (都農神社, Tsuno Jinja) is a Shinto shrine located in the Kawakita neighborhood of the town of Tsuno, Miyazaki Prefecture, Japan. It is the ichinomiya of the former Hyūga Province. The main festival of the shrine is held annually on December 5.

== Enshrined kami ==
The primary kami enshrined at Tsuno Jinja is:

- Ōkuninushi (大己貴命) head of the kunitsukami, the gods of the earth, and the original ruler of the terrestrial world,

== History ==
The foundation of Tsuno Shrine is unknown. According to the shrine's legend, it was founded six years before Emperor Jimmu's accession to the throne, when the Emperor departed Hyūga on his expedition to conquer the east. It is also claimed that Empress Jingū worshipped at this location for the safety of her fleet during her conquest of the Korean Peninsula, and said that the first time that the shrine was built was after the Empress's triumphant return. In addition to the ruins dating back to the Jōmon period, the Tsuno area is home to more than 20 burial mounds (the Tsuno Kofun Cluster), and pottery and stone tools have been excavated near the site of the shrine.

In 837 the shrine was promoted to a government shrine, and in 843 was awarded Junior Fifth Rank, per the "Shoku Nihon Kōki"). In 858, it was promoted to Junior Fourth Rank per the Nihon Sandai Jitsuroku. In the Engishiki, it is one of only four shrines listed for Hyūga Province, and at that time it was the largest shrine in Hyūga Province, with magnificent shrine buildings and vast estates. It was also involved in a protracted conflict with Tsuma Shrine, the Sōja shrine of the province. The details of this conflict are unknown as all of the ancient records have been destroyed. By the Muromachi period the Tsuno Shrine was regarded as the ichinomiya of Hyūga Province. It was rebuilt by the local warlord Itō Yoshisuke in 1549; in 1578, during a conflict between Ōtomo Sōrin and the Shimazu Yoshihisa, the shrine was destroyed by fire, and the shrine buildings, shrine treasures, and ancient documents were all destroyed. The shrine never recovered, and by 1675, traveller's accounts stated that it was a small, unattended shrine. The shrine was restored in its current form by Akizuki Tanemasa, the daimyō of Takanabe Domain, and in 1701, estates worth 20 koku were donated for its upkeep. Successive daimyō of Takanabe supported the shrine through the end of the Edo period.

During the Meiji period era of State Shinto, the shrine was rated as a National shrine, 3rd rank (国幣小社, Kokuhei Shosha) under the Modern system of ranked Shinto Shrines in 1871. in 1934, the area of the shrine was expanded and improved as part of the "celebrations of the 2600th anniversary of the founding of Japan" project sponsored by the government. The main shrine building was rebuilt in 2007.

The shrine is located 25 minutes on foot or five minutes by car from Tsuno Station on the JR Kyushu Nippō Main Line.

== Gallery ==
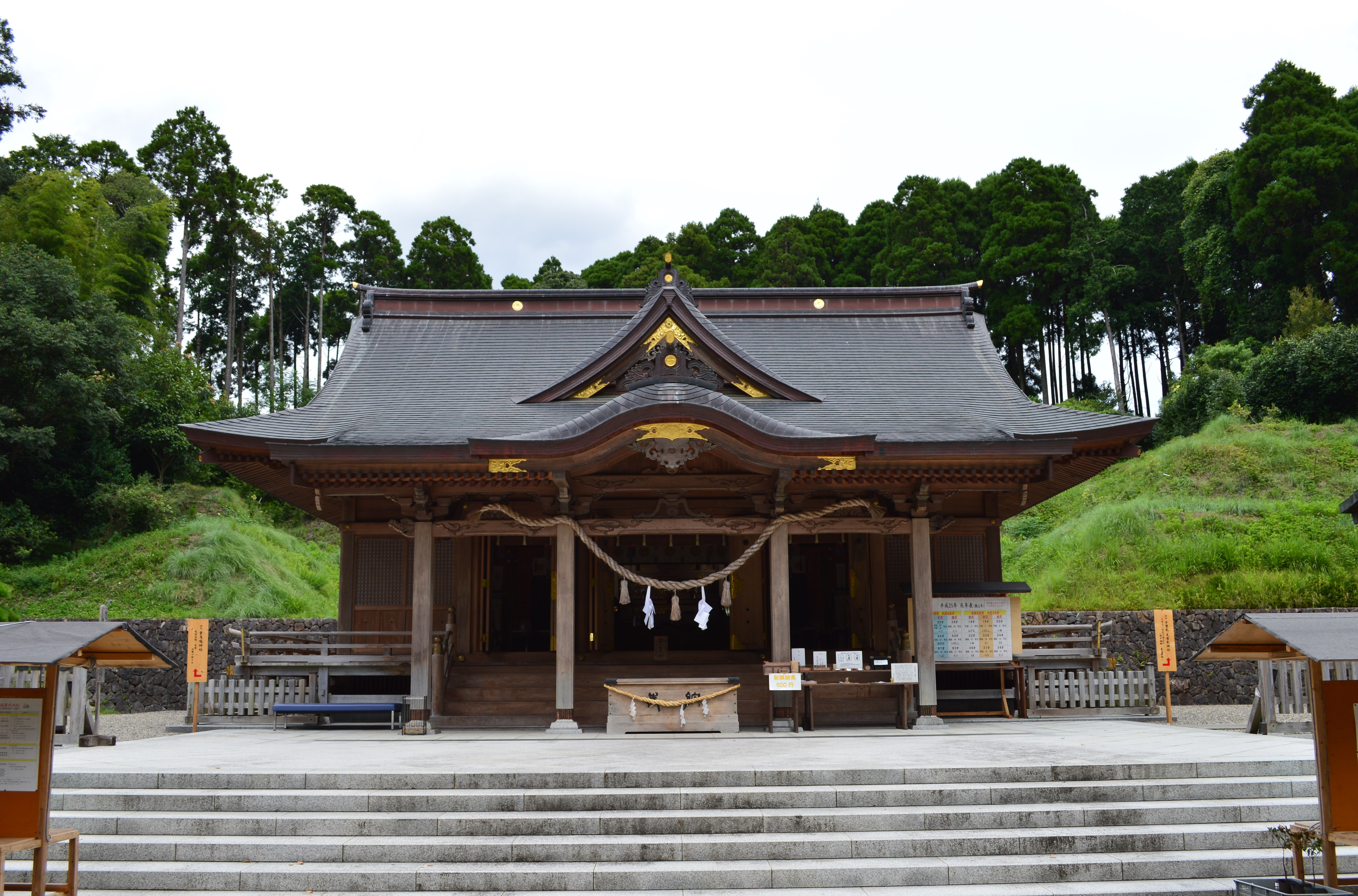
Heiden

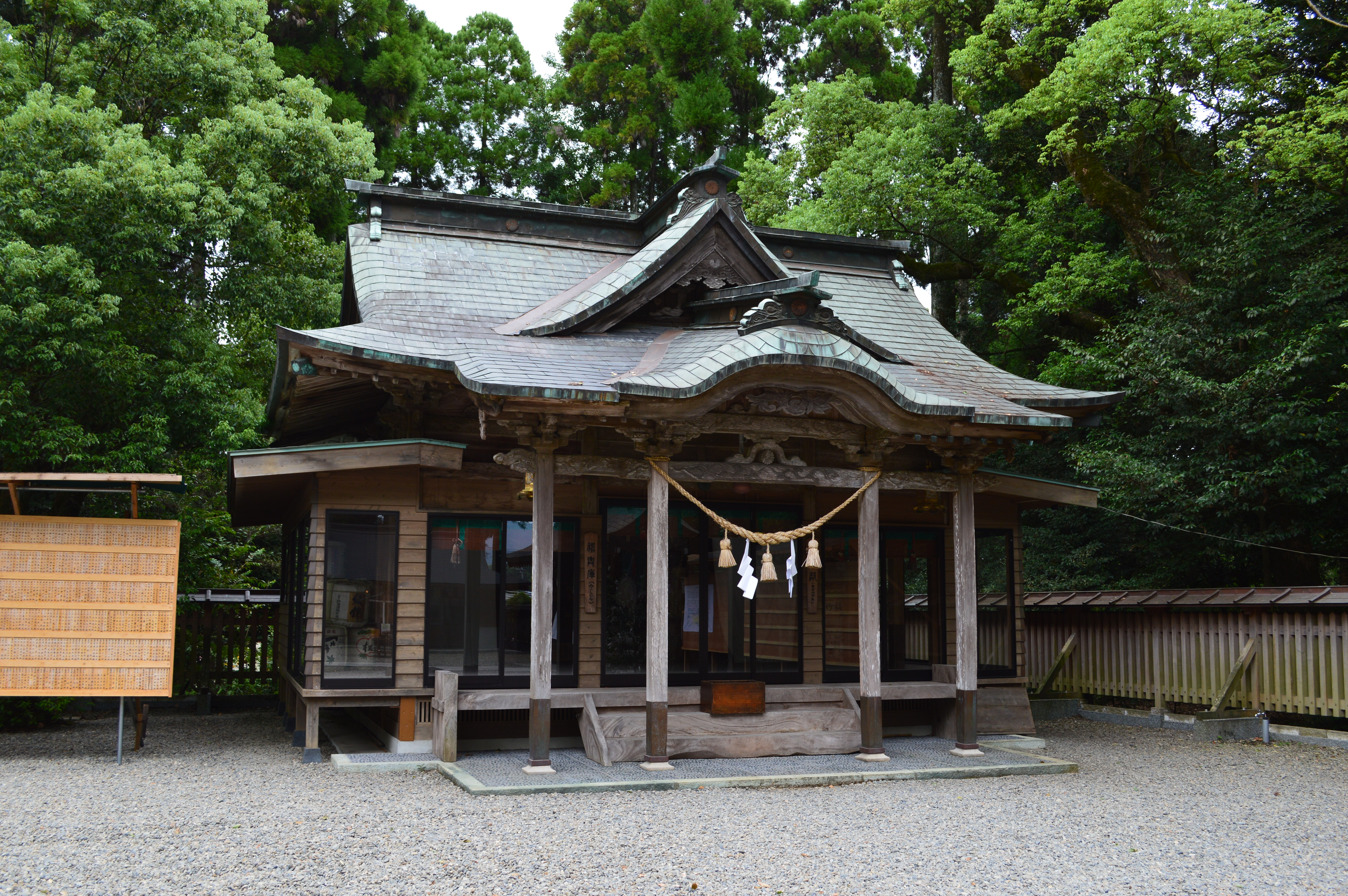
Kagura-den

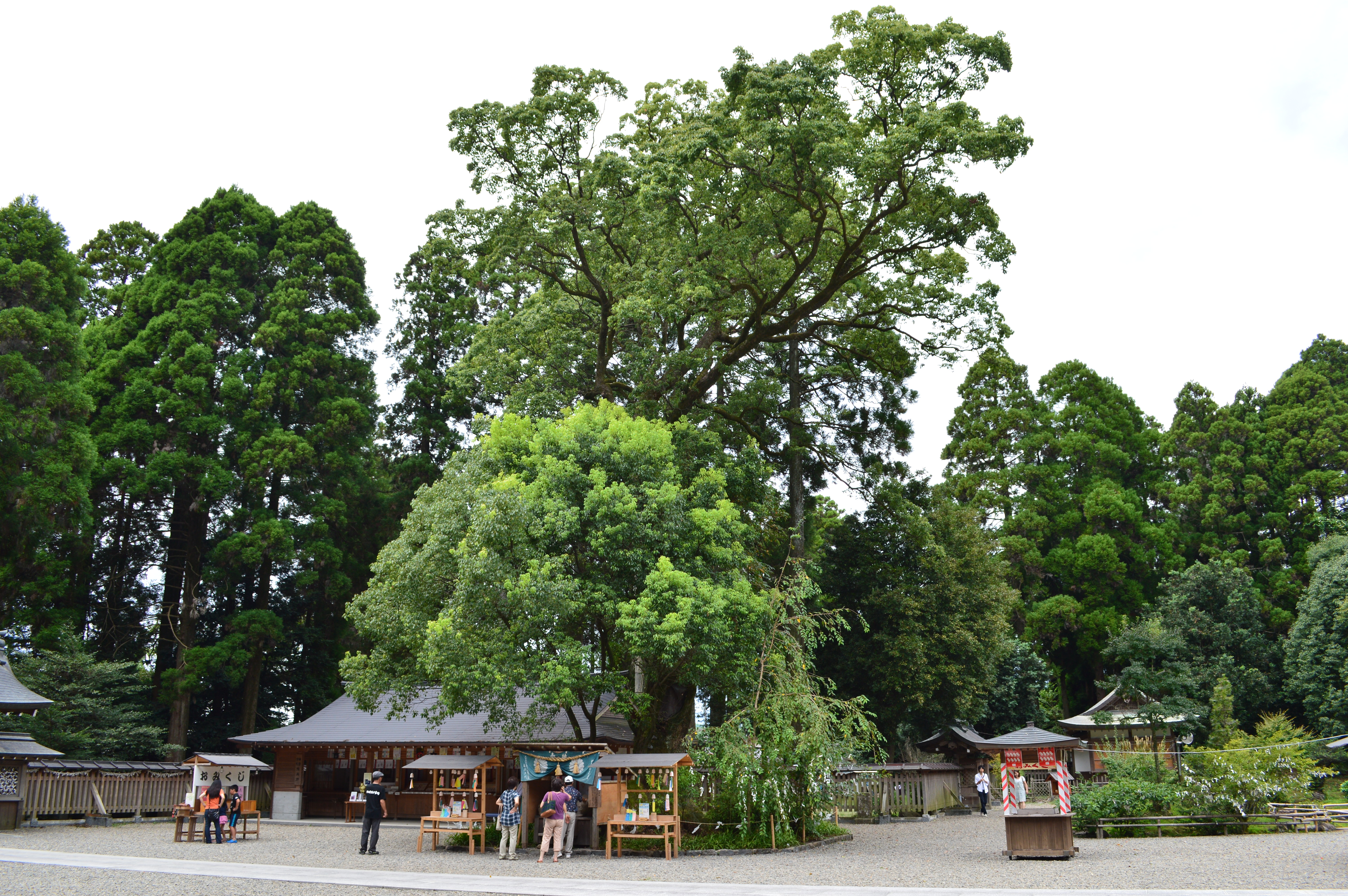
Camphora officinarum, (Tsuno town Natural Monument)

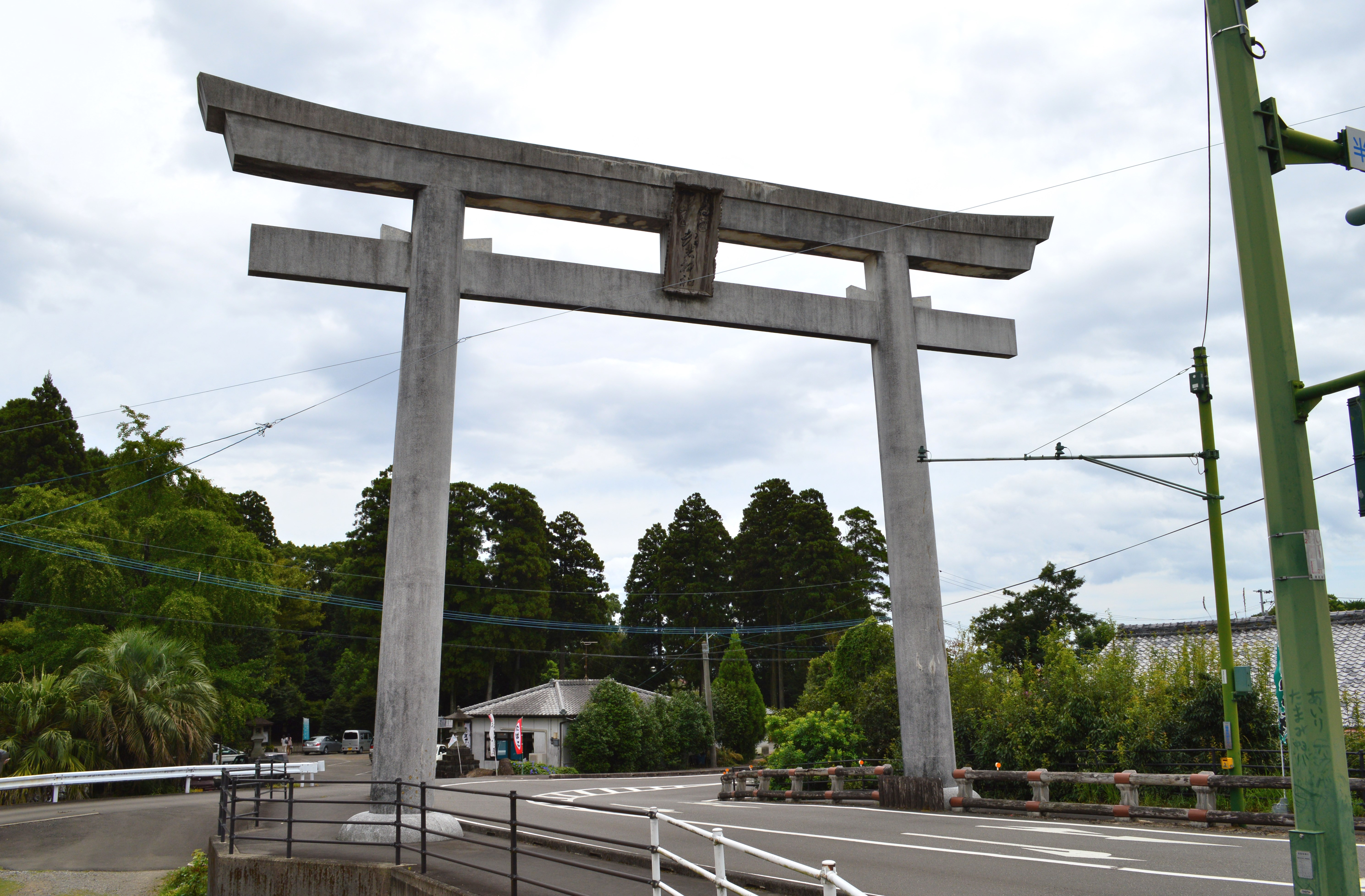
North Torii

== See also ==
- List of Shinto shrines
- Ichinomiya
