= Sōrinbaru kuyōtō =

Sengoku period stone monument

- 宗麟原供養塔 (Japanese)
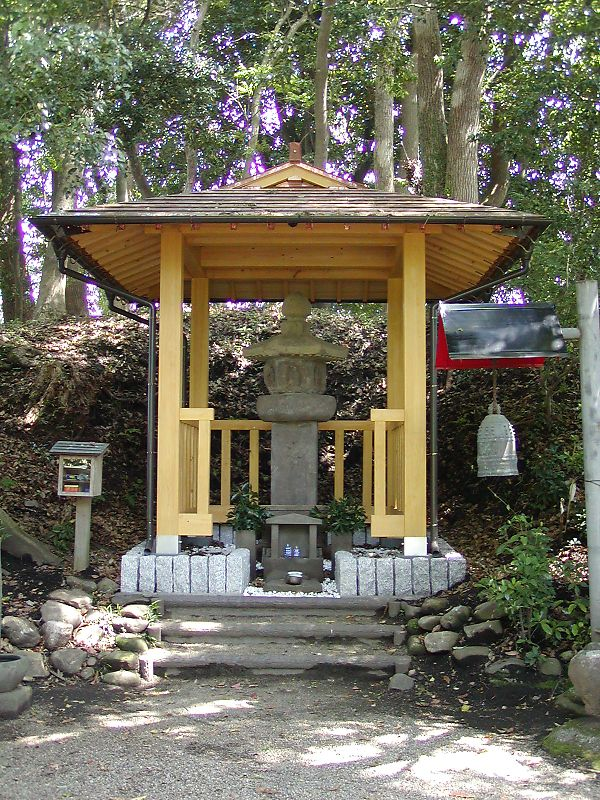
- Sōrinbaru kuyōtō

- Sōrinbaru kuyōtō Sōrinbaru kuyōtō (Japan)
- Interactive map of Sōrinbaru kuyōtō
- 32°10′14.55″N 131°28′58.17″E
- Type: stone monument
- Periods: Sengoku period
- Location: Kawaminami, Miyazaki, Japan
- Region: Kyushu

Site notes
- Public access: Yes (no facilities)

The Sōrinbaru kuyōtō (宗麟原供養塔) is a stone monument with erected in the Sengoku period to honor the dead of the Battle of Mimigawa, located in the town of Kawaminami, Miyazaki Prefecture, Japan. It was designated a National Historic Site in 1933.

== Overview ==
In the late 16th century, following a series of battles, and the Shimazu clan of Satsuma Province gained control of most of Hyūga Province. Meanwhile, Ōtomo Sōrin (retired daimyō) and his heir Yoshimune, had consolidated power in northern Kyushu and in 1578 marched south, control of Agata Prefecture (modern-day Nobeoka). The Kirishitan Ōtomo army destroyed Buddhist and Shinto religious buildings along the way. Later, The Ōtomo crossed the Mimigawa and laid siege to Takajō Castle, which was garrisoned by 500 men led by Yamada Arinobu, a Shimazu retainer. In the ensuing Battle of Mimigawa, the Shimazu used their favored "decoy tactic", with Shimazu Yoshihiro making a hasty retreat to lure the main Ōtomo army across a river, and then attacking it with his main forces from the flanks and rear. The Ōtomo were annihilated, and with this battle the Shimazu became the dominant force in Kyushu. The number of casualties in this battle was very high, with at least 4,000 from the Ōtomo army and 3,000 from the Shimazu side. The Shimazu collected the corpses of both armies, and buried them in a mass grave at the battle site.In 1585, on the seventh anniversary of the battle, Yamada Arinobu erected a kuyōtō in the form of a stone lantern with a lotus-base and carvings of six Jizō Bosatsu, to commemorate the war dead, regardless of friend or foe. A kuyōtō is a form of stupa built for the purpose of memorial service so that the deceased can rest in peace, and is thus slightly different from the more secular cenotaph.

The material used was hard tuff from Kiyotake, Miyazaki Prefecture. During the early Meiji period Haibutsu kishaku movement, it was destroyed and dumped at the bottom of a valley called "Jizodani", located to the east. Local residents salvaged the fragments in the Taisho period and rebuilt the monument, but no accurate written record remains. All of the Jizo statues are heavily damaged, and many parts of the original monument are missing and have been replaced during restoration work. The current height is approximately 3.5 meters and it is located approximately 20 minutes by car from Kawaminami Station on the JR Kyushu Nippō Main Line.

== See also ==
- List of Historic Sites of Japan (Miyazaki)
