= Mochida Kofun Cluster =

Mochida Kofun cluster
- 持田古墳群 (Japanese)
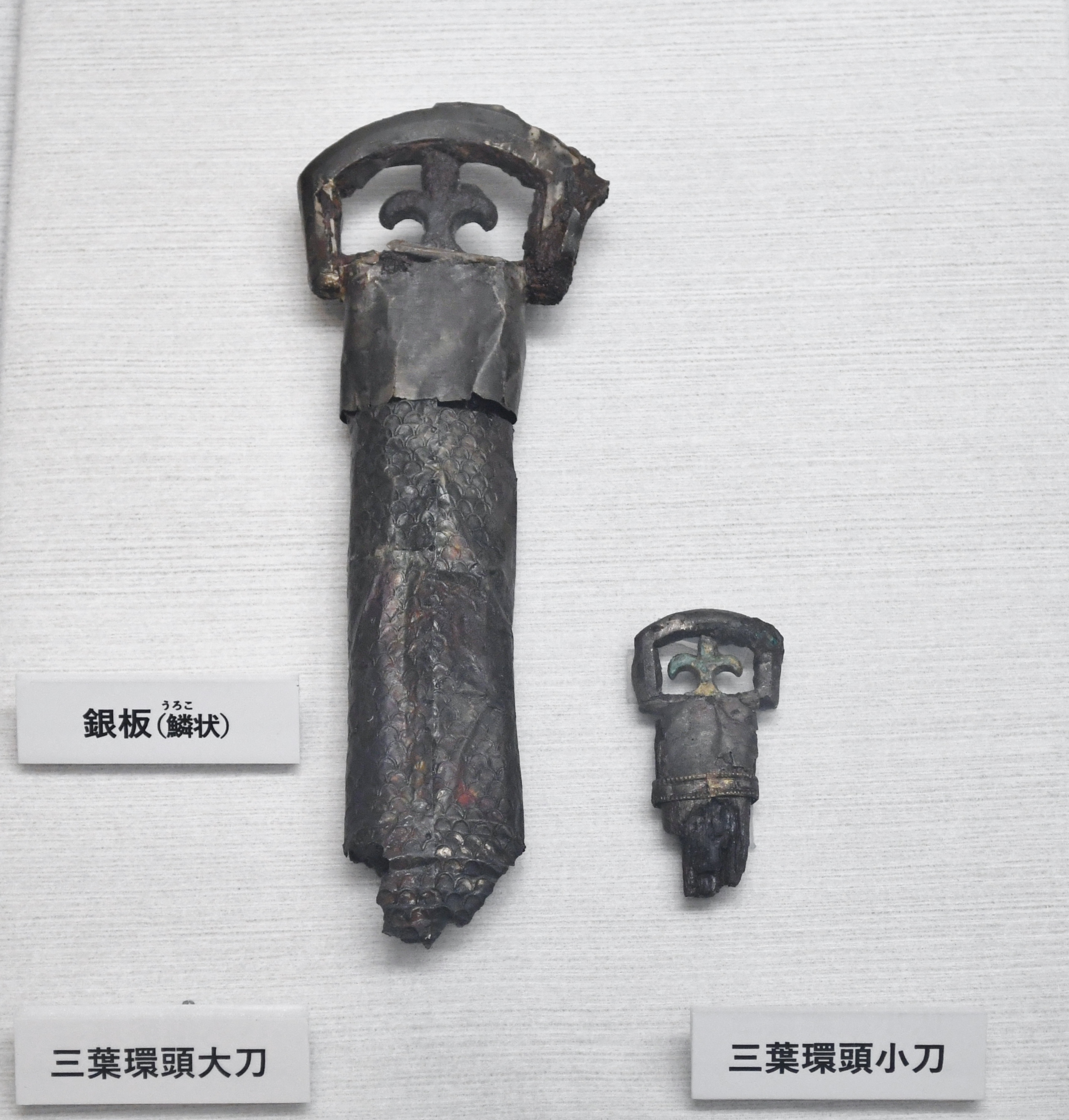
- Three leaf ring-headed swords and short swords excavated from Mochida Tomb No. 26

- Mochida Kofun cluster Mochida Kofun Cluster (Japan)
- Interactive map of Mochida Kofun cluster
- 32°08′32″N 131°31′47″E
- Type: kofun
- Periods: Kofun period
- Location: Takanabe, Miyazaki, Japan
- Region: Kyushu

History
- Built: c. 5th century AD

Site notes
- Public access: No facilities

The Mochida Kofun cluster (持田古墳群) is a group of Kofun period burial mounds located in the Mochida-cho neighborhood of the town of Takanabe, Miyazaki Prefecture in Kyushu Japan. The tumulus group was designated a National Historic Site of Japan in 1961.

== Overview ==
The Mochida Kofun Cluster consists of ten zenpō-kōen-fun (前方後円墳), which are shaped like a keyhole, having one square end and one circular end, when viewed from above, and 75 empun (円墳)-style round tombs located on the downstream left bank of the Komaru River, which runs through the center of the prefecture. The burial mounds are on a plateau at an elevation of approximately 50 meters, extending from east-to-west, bordering Japan National Route 10, and on an alluvial plain that spreads out to the southeast, but most of the burial mounds are concentrated on the west side of the plateau.

Mochida No. 1, also known as the "Hakarizuka Kofun", located on the southwest edge of the flat plateau, is a keyhole-shaped tumulus with a total length of approximately 100 meters and is the oldest and largest of the group. It was built in the first half of the 5th century. Burial mound building reached its peak from the late 5th century to the beginning of the 6th century. Of particular note are the grave goods which included bronze mirrors, and 34 of which have been designated as National Important Cultural Properties. The bronze mirrors from Mochida Kofun No. 20, 24 and 25 are identical in design to a bronze mirror found in the Gokantenjinyama Kofun in Maebashi, Gunma. Other valuable artifacts include a large amount of beads and a ring-headed iron sword. These grave goods are strongly associated with the Kinai region, and are thought to indicate that the area served as an important base for the expansion of the Yamato Kingdom within eastern Kyushu. Around 1929 and 1930, the area suffered from extensive tomb robbery, and as a result, many grave goods were scattered into private collections or have otherwise become lost.

The Mochida Kofun Cluster is approximately 10 minutes by car from Takanabe Station on the JR Kyushu Nippō Main Line.

== See also ==
- List of Historic Sites of Japan (Miyazaki)
