= Kijō, Miyazaki =

Kijō 木城町
- Town
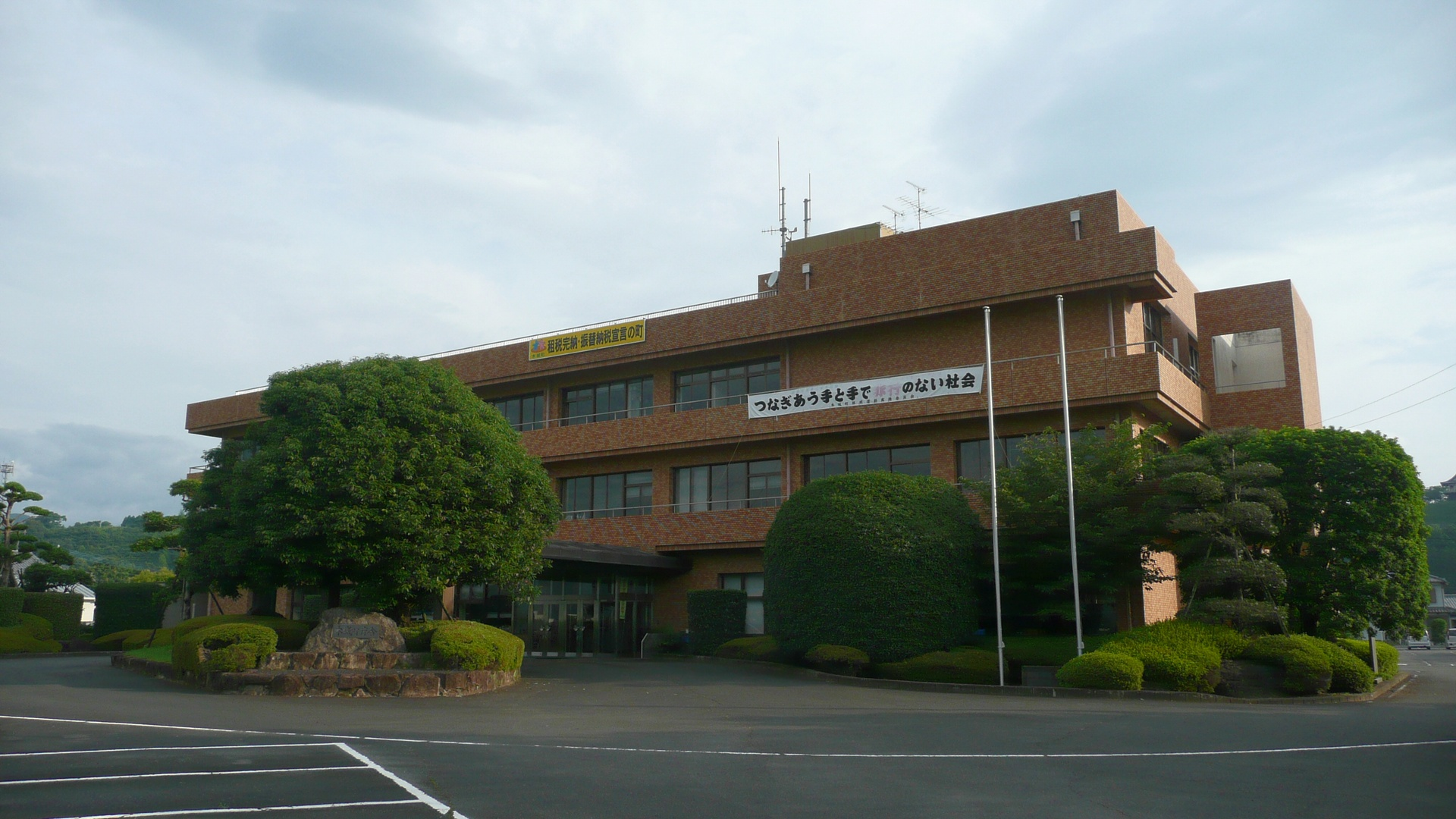
- Kijō Town Hall

- Flag Chapter
- Interactive map of Kijō
- Location in Japan
- Coordinates: 32°09′50″N 131°28′24″E
- Country: Japan
- Region: Kyushu
- Prefecture: Miyazaki
- District: Koyu

Area
  - Total: 145.96 km^{2} (56.36 sq mi)

Population (October 1, 2023)
  - Total: 4,642
  - Density: 31.80/km^{2} (82.37/sq mi)
- Time zone: UTC+09:00 (JST)
- City hall address: 1227-1 Takagi, Kijō-chō, Koyu-gun, Miyazaki-ken 884-0101
- Website: Official website
- Symbols
- Bird: White-bellied green pigeon
- Flower: Cosmos
- Tree: Evergreen oak

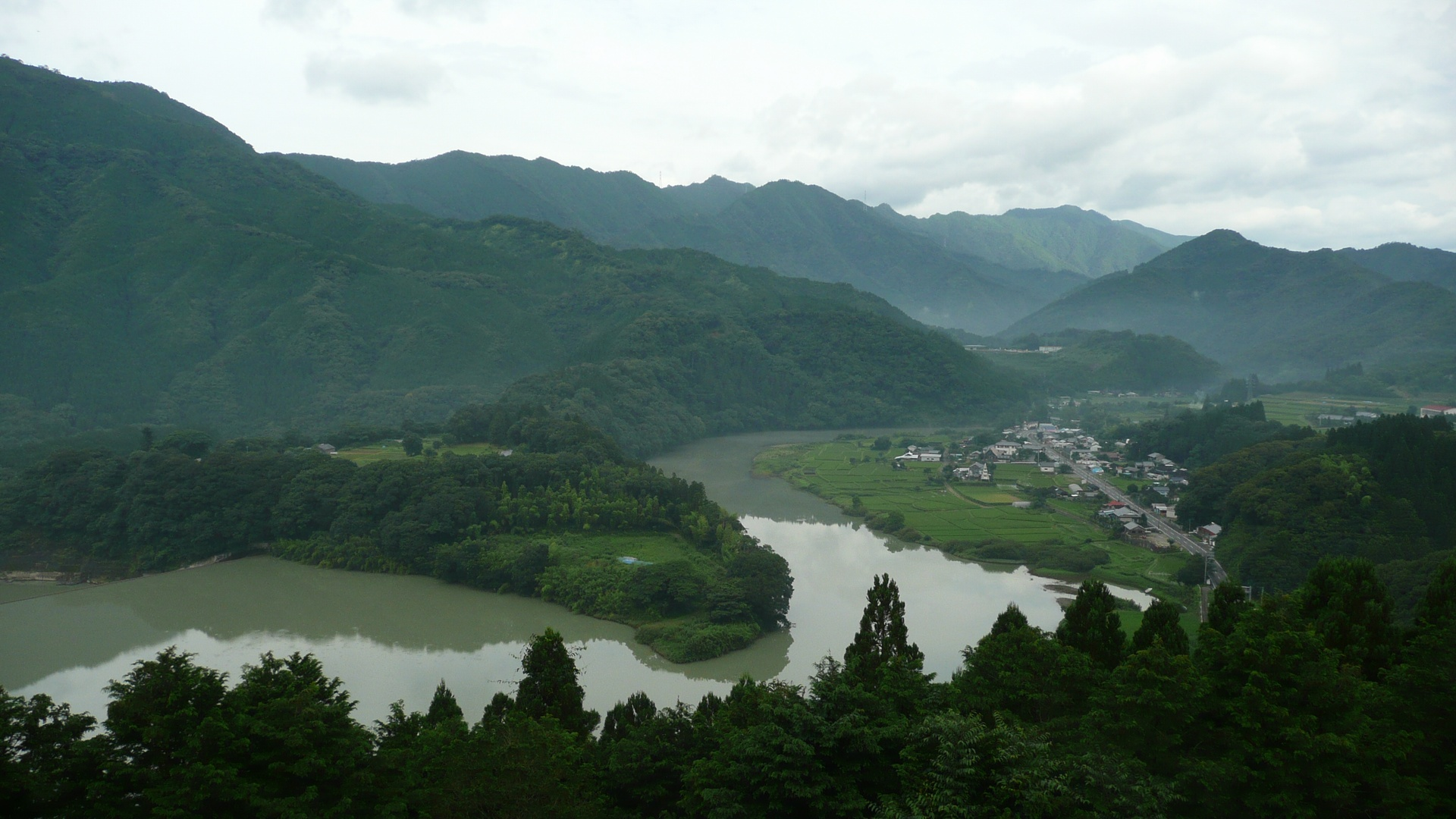
Komaru River flowing through Ishikawachi district

Kijō (木城町, Kijō-chō) is a town located in Koyu District, Miyazaki Prefecture, Japan. As of 1 October 2023, the town has an estimated population of 4,642 in 1857 households, and a population density of 32 persons per km^{2}. The total area of the town is 145.96 square kilometres (56.36 sq mi).

== Geography ==
Kijō is an inland town located in the central eastern part of Miyazaki Prefecture The Komaru River flows north to south through the center of the town, and along which multiple hydroelectric power generation dams have been constructed.

=== Neighbouring municipalities ===
Miyazaki Prefecture

- Hyūga
- Kawaminami
- Misato
- Saito
- Takanabe
- Tsuno

=== Climate ===
Kijō has a humid subtropical climate (Köppen Cfa) characterized by warm summers and cool winters with light to no snowfall. The average annual temperature in Kijō is 15.6 °C. The average annual rainfall is 2234 mm with September as the wettest month. The temperatures are highest on average in August, at around 25.6 °C, and lowest in January, at around 5.5 °C.

=== Demographics ===
Per Japanese census data, the population of Kijō has been relatively steady for the past 40 years.

Historical population
| Year | Pop. | ±% |
|---|---|---|
| 1970 | 8,063 | — |
| 1980 | 6,031 | −25.2% |
| 1990 | 5,857 | −2.9% |
| 2000 | 5,871 | +0.2% |
| 2010 | 5,759 | −1.9% |
| 2020 | 5,177 | −10.1% |

== History ==
The area of Kijō was part of ancient Hyūga Province. The area was under the control of the Shimazu clan from the Nanboku-chō period, and was a contested borderland fought over many times during the Sengoku period. During the Edo period, it was part of the holdings of Takanabe Domain. The village of Kijō within Koyu District, Miyazaki was established on April 1, 1889, with the creation of the modern municipalities system. It was raised to town status on April 1, 1973.

== Government ==
Kijō has a mayor-council form of government with a directly elected mayor and a unicameral town council of 11 members. Kijō, collectively with the other municipalities of Koyu District contributes three members to the Miyazaki Prefectural Assembly. In terms of national politics, the town is part of the Miyazaki 2nd district of the lower house of the Diet of Japan.

== Economy ==
The main industry of Kijō is agriculture and forestry.

== Education ==
Kijō has one public elementary school and one public junior high school operated by the town government. The town does not have a high school.

== Transportation ==
=== Railways ===
Kijō has no passenger rail service. The nearest train station is Takanabe on the JR Kyushu Nippō Main Line.

=== Highways ===
There are no expressways or national highways running through Kijō. The nearest interchange is the Takanabe Interchange (Higashikyushu Expressway) in neighbouring Takanabe. It is located approximately 3 kilometers from the center of town, making it easily accessible.
