= Tsuno Station =

Railway station in Tsuno, Miyazaki Prefecture, Japan

Tsuno Station 都農駅
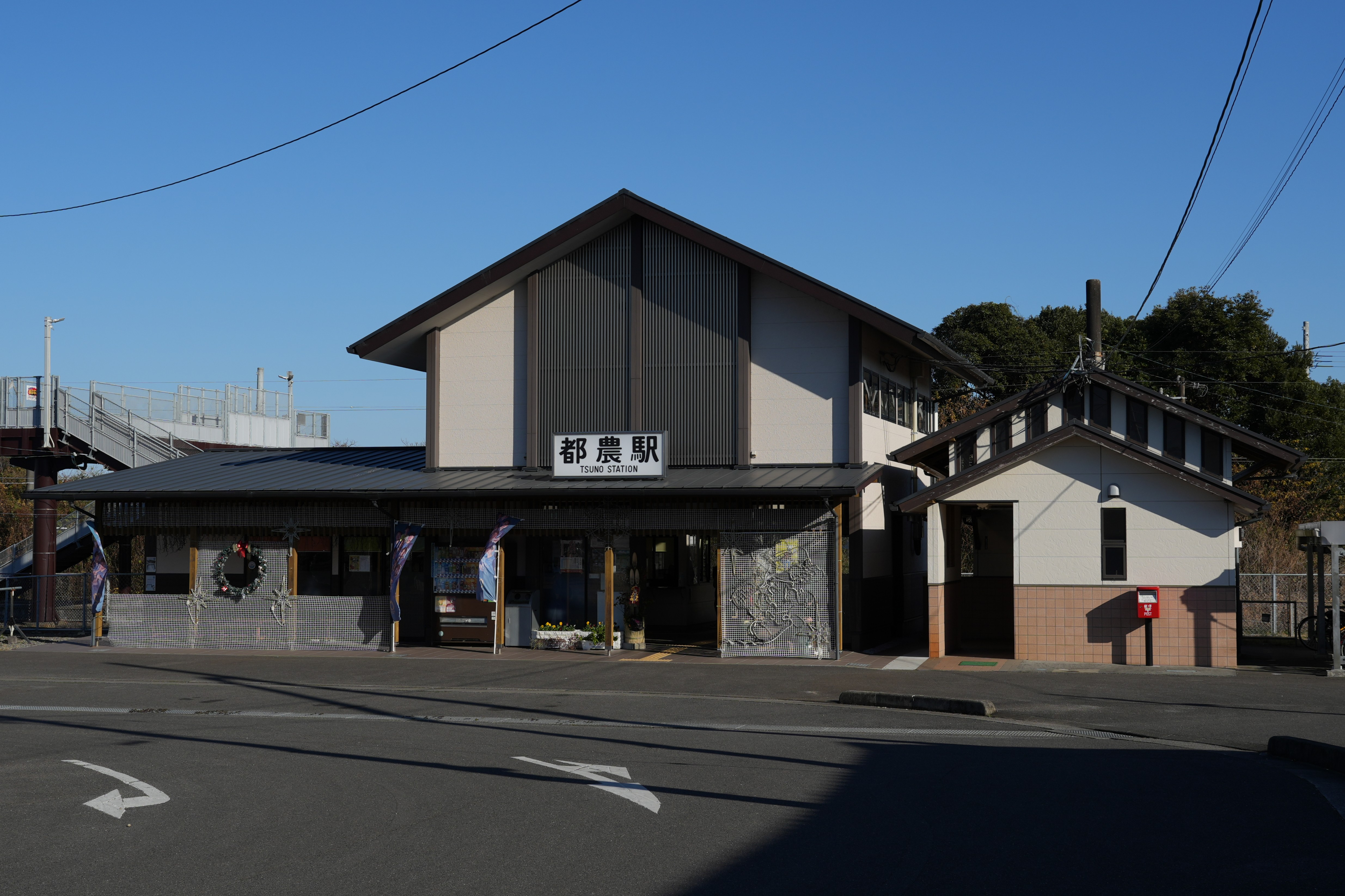
- Tsuno Station in 2024

General information
- Location: Kawakita, Tsuno-cho, Koyu-gun, Miyazaki-ken 889-1201; Japan
- Coordinates: 32°15′03″N 131°34′05″E
- Operator: JR Kyushu
- Line: ■ Nippō Main Line
- Distance: 298.7 km from Kokura
- Platforms: 1 island platform
- Tracks: 2 + 1 siding

Construction
- Structure type: At grade
- Cycle facilities: Bike shed
- Accessible: Yes - platforms linked by footbridge with elevator

Other information
- Status: Kan'i itaku station
- Website: Official website

History
- Opened: 11 June 1921

Passengers
- FY2016: 395 daily
- Rank: 272nd (among JR Kyushu stations)

Services
Preceding station	JR Kyushu	Following station
Kawaminami towards Kagoshima	Nippō Main Line	Higashi-Tsuno towards Kokura
Location
- Location within Miyazaki Prefecture Location within Japan

Tsuno Station (都農駅, Tsuno-eki) is a passenger railway station in the town of Tsuno, Miyazaki, Japan. It is operated by JR Kyushu and is on the Nippō Main Line.

== Lines ==
The station is served by the Nippō Main Line and is located 298.7 kilometres (185.6 mi) from the starting point of the line at Kokura.

== Layout ==
The station consists of an island platform serving two tracks at grade with a siding. The station building is wooden structure built in traditional Japanese style and remodelled in 2017. It houses a staffed ticket window, a waiting area, the office of the local tourism association and a community space which features a diorama maintained by local railway enthusiasts. Access to the island platform is by means of a footbridge. A bike shed is provided at the station forecourt.

JR Kyushu had planned to cease staffing the station. To maintain service to residents, the Tsuno town authorities took over the management of the ticket window as a kan'i itaku agent on 1 April 2015.

=== Platforms ===
1	■ ■ Nippō Main Line	for Nobeoka and Oita
2	■ ■ Nippō Main Line	for Miyazaki and Miyazaki Airport

== History ==
In 1913, the Miyazaki Prefectural Railway (宮崎県営鉄道) had opened a line from Miyazaki northwards to Hirose (now closed). After the Miyazaki Prefectural Railway was nationalized on 21 September 1917, Japanese Government Railways (JGR) undertook the subsequent extension of the track as part of the then Miyazaki Main Line, reaching Takanabe by 11 September 1920. In the next phase of expansion, the track was extended to Mimitsu, which opened as the new northern terminus on 11 June 1921. Tsuno was opened on the same day as an intermediate station on the new track. Expanding north from Mimitsu in phases and joining up with other networks, the track eventually reached Kokura and the entire stretch from Kokura through this station to Miyakonojō was redesignated as the Nippō Main Line on 15 December 1923. Fright operations ceased in 1981 and baggage handling in 1984. With the privatization of Japanese National Railways (JNR), the successor of JGR, on 1 April 1987, the station came under the control of JR Kyushu.

== Passenger statistics ==
In fiscal 2016, the station was used by an average of 395 passengers daily (boarding passengers only), and it ranked 272nd among the busiest stations of JR Kyushu.

== Surrounding area ==
- Tsuno Town Hall

== See also ==
- List of railway stations in Japan
