= Shintomi, Miyazaki =

Shintomi 新富町
- Town
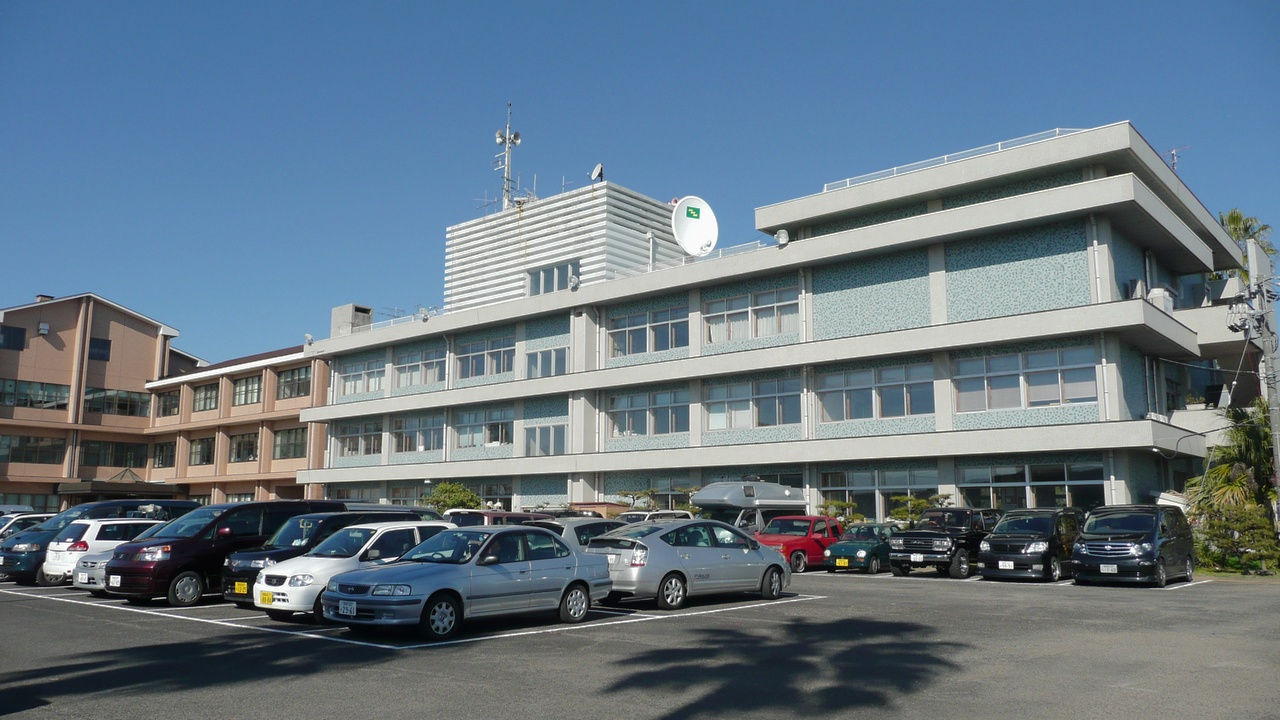
- Shintomi Town Office

- Flag Chapter
- Location of Shintomi in Miyazaki Prefecture

- Location in Japan
- Coordinates: 32°4′08″N 131°29′17″E
- Country: Japan
- Region: Kyushu
- Prefecture: Miyazaki
- District: Koyu

Area
  - Total: 61.53 km^{2} (23.76 sq mi)

Population (October 1, 2023)
  - Total: 16,117
  - Density: 261.9/km^{2} (678.4/sq mi)
- Time zone: UTC+09:00 (JST)
- City hall address: 7491 Kamitonda, Shintomi-cho, Koyu-gun, Miyazaki-ken 889-1493
- Website: Official website
- Symbols
- Flower: Lupinus
- Tree: Prunus mume

Shintomi (新富町, Shintomi-chō) is a town located in Koyu District, Miyazaki Prefecture, Japan. As of 1 October 2023, the town had an estimated population of 16,117 in 6,593 households, and a population density of 260 persons per km^{2}. The total area of the town is 61.53 square kilometres (23.76 sq mi).

== Geography ==
Shintomi is located in central Miyazaki Prefecture, bordered by the Hyūga Sea to the east. The town is generally flat, with plains on the sides and south and a plateau on the west side. Approximately 70% of the town area is flat. The Hitotsuse River flows through the south of the town.

=== Neighbouring municipalities ===
Miyazaki Prefecture

- Miyazaki
- Saito
- Takanabe

=== Climate ===
Shintomi has a humid subtropical climate (Köppen Cfa) characterized by warm summers and cool winters with light to no snowfall. The average annual temperature in Shintomi is 16.4 °C. The average annual rainfall is 2216 mm with September as the wettest month. The temperatures are highest on average in August, at around 26.1 °C, and lowest in January, at around 6.5 °C.

=== Demographics ===
Per Japanese census data, the population of Shintomi is as shown below

Historical population
Year	Pop.	±%
1950	12,106	—
1960	16,463	+36.0%
1970	17,123	+4.0%
1980	16,514	−3.6%
1990	17,220	+4.3%
2000	18,085	+5.0%
2010	19,058	+5.4%
2020	18,094	−5.1%

== History ==
The area of Shintomi was part of ancient Hyūga Province. During the Edo period, the area was largely part of the holdings of Sadowara Domain. The villages of Tonda and Nyūta within Koyu District, Miyazaki was established on April 1, 1889, with the creation of the modern municipalities system. The villages merged on March 31, 1959, to form the town of Shintomi.

== Government ==
Shintomi has a mayor-council form of government with a directly elected mayor and a unicameral town council of 12 members. Shinomi, collectively with the other municipalities of Koyu District contributes three members to the Miyazaki Prefectural Assembly. In terms of national politics, the town is part of the Miyazaki 2nd district of the lower house of the Diet of Japan. The town is the location of the JASDF Nyutabaru Air Base.

== Economy ==
The main industry of Shintomi is agriculture. Bell peppers, tomatoes, cymbidium, and cucumbers are cultivated. In the mountain areas, chickens and other livestock are raised.

== Education ==
Shintomi has two public elementary schools and one public junior high school operated by the town government and one public high school operated by the Miyazaki Prefectural Board of Education. The prefecture also operates one special education school for the handicapped. In Shintomi, all of the windows in the schools are double-paned to block noise from a nearby military base.

== Transportation ==
=== Railways ===
JR Kyushu - Nippō Main Line

- Hyūga-Shintomi

=== Highways ===
- Higashikyushu Expressway
- National Route 10
- National Route 219

== Local attractions ==
- Nyūtabaru Kofun Cluster, National Historic Site
