= Higashikyushu Expressway =

Expressway in East Kyushu, Japan

Higashikyushu Expressway
- 東九州自動車道

Route information
- Length: 500 km (310 mi)
- Existed: 1999–present

Major junctions
- From: Kitakyushu Junction in Kyushu Expressway
- To: Kajiki Junction in Aira; Kyushu Expressway

Location
- Country: Japan
- Major cities: Oita, Nobeoka, Miyazaki; Kanoya, Kirishima

Highway system
- National highways of Japan; Expressways of Japan

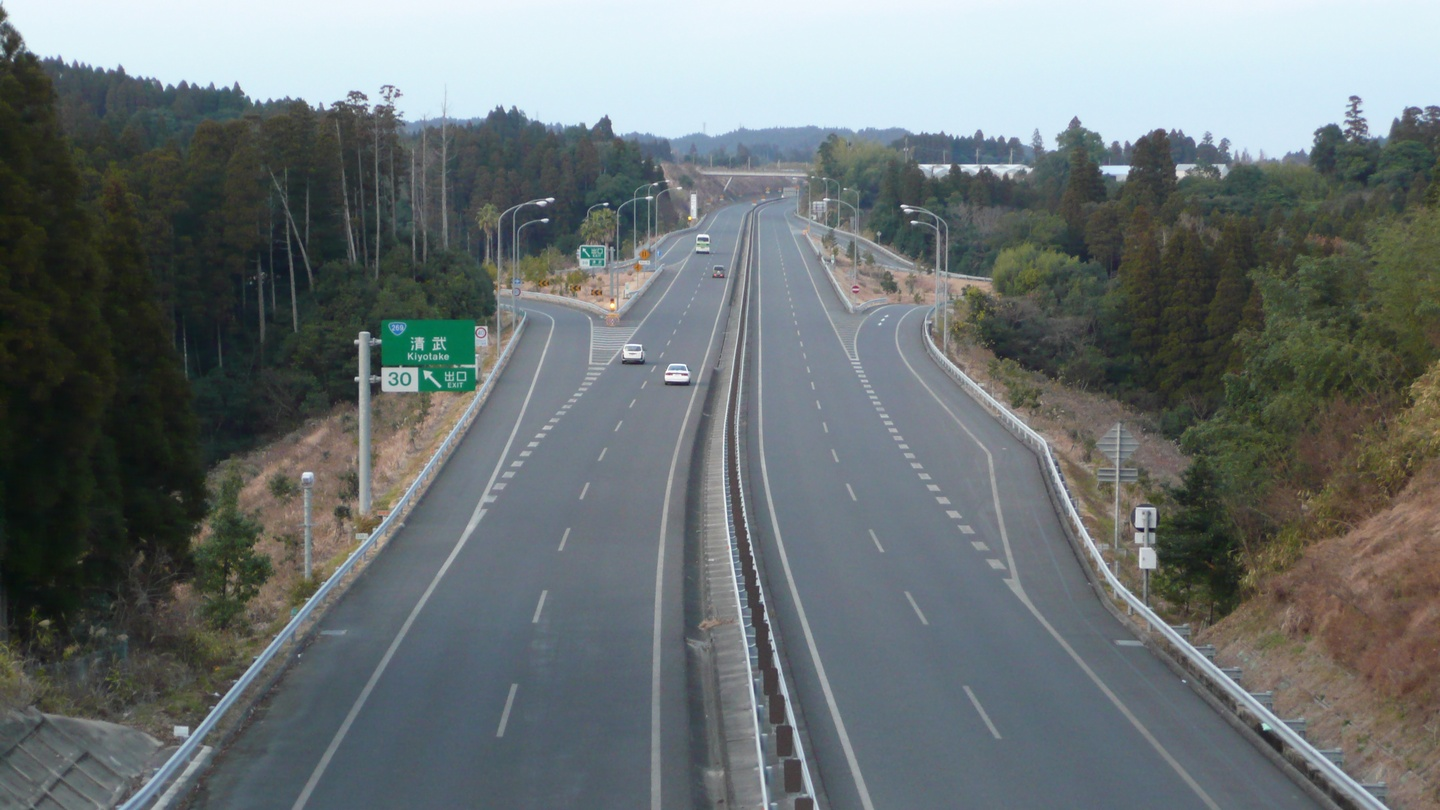
Miyazaki, Japan

The Higashikyushu Expressway (東九州自動車道, Higashi-Kyūshū jidōshadō) is one of the expressways of Japan from Kitakyūshū (and the bridge to Honshū) to east of Kagoshima linking with the Kyushu Expressway. It runs north to south, through the prefectures of Fukuoka, Oita, Miyazaki and the Kagoshima prefectures. The freeway runs entirely on the island of Kyūshū. The total length is 500 km.

== Overview ==
The first section of the expressway was opened to traffic in 1999. As of March 2009 the expressway is incomplete in many areas. The section between Soo Yagorō Interchange and Sueyoshi Takarabe Interchange opened in 2010. Most of the incomplete areas were built according to the New Direct Control System, whereby the burden for construction costs will be shared by the national and local governments and no tolls will be collected. Currently the section between Saiki Interchange and Nobeoka Minami Interchange, and Kanoya Kushira Junction and Sueyoshi Takarabe Interchange operates according to this principle.

The expressway is 4 lanes from Kitakyushu Junction to Kanda Kitakyushu-kūkō Interchange and Hiji Junction to Ōita Miyagawachi Interchange, and 2 lanes for all remaining sections.

The route parallels the Nippō Main Line of Kyushu Railway Company and National Route 10 for much of its length.

== History ==
- December 15, 1994, a section from Hiji Junction to Hayami Interchange was opened to traffic.
- November 27, 1999, a section from Oita Mera to Oita Miyagawachi Interchanges was opened to traffic.
- March 4, 2000, a section from Kokubu to Hayato Higashi Interchange was opened to traffic with another freeway.
- March 25, 2000, a section from Miyazaki Nishi Interchange to Kiyotake Junction was opened to traffic.
- March 31, 2001, a section from Saito to Miyazaki Nishi Interchange was opened to traffic.
- April 18, 2001, the Oita Nogyo Bunka Koen Interchange was opened.
- December 19, 2001, the Kajiki Junction was opened to traffic with another freeway.
- December 27, 2001, a section from Oita Miyagawachi to Tsukumi Interchanges was opened to traffic.
- March 2, 2002, a section from Sueyoshi Takarabe to Kokubu Interchanges was opened to traffic.
- March 30, 2002, the Hiji Junction was opened to traffic with another freeway.
- February 26, 2006, a section from Kitakyushu Junction to Kanda Kitakyushu Airport Interchange was opened to traffic.
- June 28, 2008, a section from Tsukumi to Saiki Interchange was opened to traffic.
- March 14, 2010, a section from Soo Yagoro to Sueyoshi Takarabe Interchange was opened to traffic.
- July 17, 2010, a section from Takanabe to Saito Interchange was opened to traffic.
- December 14, 2010, a section from Kadogawa to Hyuga Interchange was opened to traffic with another freeway.
- December 15, 2012, a section from Sumie to Kitagawa Interchange was opened to traffic.
- December 22, 2012, a section from Tsuno to Takanabe Interchange was opened to traffic.
- February 16, 2013, a section from Kamae to Kitaura Interchange was opened to traffic.
- March 23, 2013, a section from Kiyotake Junction to Kiyotake Minami Interchange was opened to traffic.
- March 8, 2014, a section from Kitaura to Sumie Interchange was opened to traffic.
- March 16, 2014, a section from Hyuga to Tsuno Interchange was opened to traffic.
- March 23, 2014, a section from Kanda Kitakyushu Airport to Yukuhashi Interchange was opened to traffic.
- December 13, 2014, a section from Yukuhashi to Miyako Toyotsu Interchange was opened to traffic with another freeway.
- December 13, 2014, the Shiida Minami Interchange was opened.
- December 21, 2014, a section from Kanoya Kushira Junction to Soo Yagoro Interchange was opened to traffic.
- December 21, 2014, the Kanoya Kushira Junction was opened to traffic with another freeway.
- March 1, 2015, a section from Buzen to Usa Interchanges was opened to traffic with another freeway.
- March 21, 2015, a section from Saiki to Kamae Interchanges was opened to traffic.
- April 28, 2015, the Imagawa Parking Area and the Yukuhashi Imagawa Bus Stop was opened.
- April 24, 2016, a section from Shiida Minami to Buzen Interchange was opened to traffic which made the Higashikyushu Expressway from Kitakyushu to Miyazaki fully accessible with no gaps.
- March 25, 2017, the Kadogawa Minami Smart Interchange was opened.
- March 11, 2018, a section from Nishinan Kitago to Nichinan Togo Interchanges was opened to traffic.
- August 5, 2018, a section from Hiji Junction to Oita Mera Interchange is incorporated as part of the Higashikyushu Expressway.
- August 5, 2018, the Beppuwan Smart Interchange was fully accessible.
- October 6, 2019, the Kunitomi Smart Interchange was opened.

== Interchanges ==
- IC - interchange, SIC - smart interchange, JCT - junction, SA - service area, PA - parking area, BS - bus stop, TN - tunnel, BR - bridge, TB - toll gate
- Bus stops labeled "○" are currently in use; those marked "◆" are closed.

=== Between Kitakyushu Junction and Aburatsu Interchange ===
No.	Name	Connections	Dist. from Origin	Bus stop	Notes	Location	
(2-1)	Kitakyushu JCT	Kyushu Expressway	0.0			Fukuoka	Kokuraminami-ku, Kitakyūshū
1	Kanda Kitakyushu Airport IC	Pref. Route 245 (Kitakyushu Airport Route)	8.2			Fukuoka	Kanda
2	Yukuhashi IC	National Route 201	16.8			Fukuoka	Yukuhashi
PA/SIC	Imagawa PA/SIC	Pref. Route 34 (Yukuhashi Soeda Route) via Yukuhashi city road	19.1	○		Fukuoka	Yukuhashi
3	Miyako Toyotsu IC	National Route 10 (Shiida Road)	24.2			Fukuoka	Miyako
4	Tsuiki IC	Pref. Route 237 (Sawada Shimobefu Route)	26.4			Fukuoka	Chikujō
-	Shiida TB	-	27.1		Abandoned on December 13, 2014	Fukuoka	Chikujō
5	Shiida IC	Pref. Route 231 (Kurohira Shiida Route)	31.5			Fukuoka	Chikujō
6	Shiida Minami IC	National Route 10 (Shiida Road)	33.1		For Kitakyushu only	Fukuoka	Chikujō
7	Buzen IC	Pref. Route 32 (Saigawa Buzen Route)	40.3			Fukuoka	Buzen
PA/SIC	Kōge PA/SIC	National Route 10 (Buzen Bypass, Nakatsu Bypass) via Kōge town road	45.5			Fukuoka	Kōge
8	Nakatsu IC	Nakatsu Hita Road	52.5			Oita	Nakatsu
9	Usa IC	National Route 10 (Usa Road, Usa Beppu Road)	61.4			Oita	Usa
9-1	Innai IC/TB	National Route 387	66.0		For Oita only TB: Abandoned on September 16, 2014	Oita	Usa
9-2	Ajimu IC	Pref. Route 42 (Yamaga Innai Route)	71.2	○		Oita	Usa
9-3	Oita Nōgyō Bunka Kōen IC	Pref. Route 42 (Yamaga Innai Route)	77.5			Oita	Usa
9-4	Hayami IC	National Route 10 (Usa Beppu Road, Hiji Bypass); Pref. Route 24 (Hiji Yamaga Route)	83.8			Oita	Hiji
10	Hiji JCT	Ōita Expressway	87.1			Oita	Hiji
SA/SIC	Beppuwan SA/SIC	National Route 500 via Beppu city road Pref. Route 218 (Beppu Yamaga Route)	89.5	○		Oita	Beppu
11	Beppu IC	Pref. Route 11 (Beppu Ichinomiya Route)	94.3	◆		Oita	Beppu
BS	Hasama BS		103.7	◆		Oita	Yufu
12	Oita IC	Pref. Route 21 (Oita Usuki Route)	109.1			Oita	Oita
13	Oita Mitsuyoshi IC	National Route 210 (Kinoue Bypass)	113.5			Oita	Oita
14	Oita Mera IC	National Route 10 (Oita-Minami Bypass); Pref. Route 56 (Nakahanda Shimogori Route)	116.9			Oita	Oita
PA	Oita Matsuoka PA		119.8			Oita	Oita
15	Oita Miyagawachi IC	National Route 197 (Oita-Higashi Bypass)	123.1			Oita	Oita
16	Usuki IC	National Route 502	137.1			Oita	Usuki
17	Tsukumi IC	Pref. Route 648 (Tsukumi Interchange Route)	144.1			Oita	Tsukumi
PA	Yayoi PA				Scheduled to be opened in 2021	Oita	Saiki
TB	Saiki TB				Toll Barrier	Oita	Saiki
18	Saiki IC	Pref. Route 36 (Saiki Tsukumi Route)	157.1			Oita	Saiki
18-1	Saiki Katata IC	Pref. Route 603 (Akagi Fukihara Saiki Route)	162.2			Oita	Saiki
19	Kamae IC	National Route 388	177.5			Oita	Saiki
19-1	Kamae Hatōzu IC	Pref. Route 122 (Furue Maruichibi Route)	186.3			Oita	Saiki
20	Kitaura IC	National Route 388	191.7			Miyazaki	Nobeoka
20-1	Sumie IC	Pref. Route 243 (Sumie Interchange Route)	198.1		For Nobeoka only	Miyazaki	Nobeoka
21	Kitagawa IC	National Route 10 (Nobeoka Road)	203.7			Miyazaki	Nobeoka
22	Nobeoka JCT/IC	Kyushu Chūō Expressway; Pref. Route 241 (Nobeoka Interchange Route)	216.5	○		Miyazaki	Nobeoka
23	Nobeoka Minami IC	National Route 10 (Totoro Bypass, Nobeoka Road, Nobeoka-Minami Road)	223.5			Miyazaki	Nobeoka
TB	Kadogawa TB		227.9		Toll Barrier	Miyazaki	Kadogawa
24	Kadogawa IC	National Route 10 (Nobeoka-Minami Road); Pref. Route 226 (Totoro Hyūga Route)	228.0		For Nobeoka only	Miyazaki	Kadogawa
BS	Kadogawa BS			○		Miyazaki	Kadogawa
SIC	Kadogawa Minami SIC	National Route 10 (Nobeoka-Minami Road); Pref. Route 226 (Totoro Hyūga Route) via Kadogawa town road	229.6		For Miyazaki only	Miyazaki	Kadogawa
25	Hyūga IC	National Route 327 (Hyūga Bypass)	241.9	○		Miyazaki	Hyūga
26	Tsuno IC	Pref. Route 303 (Tsuno Interchange Route)	261.9			Miyazaki	Tsuno
PA	Kawaminami PA		268.9			Miyazaki	Kawaminami
27	Takanabe IC	Pref. Route 308 (Takanabe Interchange Route)	274.8			Miyazaki	Takanabe
28	Saito IC	Pref. Route 321 (Saito Interchange Route)	286.9	○		Miyazaki	Saito
BS	Kunitomi BS		297.9	○		Miyazaki	Kunitomi
SIC	Kunitomi SIC	Pref. Route 26 (Miyazaki Suki Route)	298.5			Miyazaki	Kunitomi
BS	Miyazaki BS		302.6	○		Miyazaki	Miyazaki
29	Miyazaki Nishi IC	National Route 10 (Miyazaki-Nishi Bypass)	303.7			Miyazaki	Miyazaki
PA	Miyazaki PA		306.7			Miyazaki	Miyazaki
30	Kiyotake IC	Pref. Route 371 (Kiyotake Interchange Route)	311.6			Miyazaki	Miyazaki
(4-1)	Kiyotake JCT	Miyazaki Expressway	313.8			Miyazaki	Miyazaki
TB	Kiyotake Minami TB				Toll Barrier	Miyazaki	Miyazaki
30-1	Kiyotake Minami IC	Pref. Route 378 (Kiyotake Minami Interchange Route)	315.0			Miyazaki	Miyazaki
Under Construction						Miyazaki	Miyazaki
31	Nichinan Kitagō IC	Pref. Route 28 (Nichinan Takaoka Route); Pref. Route 429 (Inohae Route)	332.8			Miyazaki	Nichinan
32	Nichinan Togō IC	National Route 220 (Nichinan Shibushi Road); Pref. Route 434 (Kazeda Hoshikura Route)	341.8			Miyazaki	Nichinan
	Aburatsu IC	National Route 222	345.0		Planned	Miyazaki	Nichinan
Planned route

=== Between Shibushi Interchange and Kajiki Junction ===
No.	Name	Connections	Dist. from Origin	Dist. from Terminus	Bus stop	Notes	Location	
Planned route
	Natsui IC		0.0	85.5		Planned	Kagoshima	Shibushi
35	Shibushi IC	National Route 220 (Nichinan Shibushi Road); Miyakonojō Shibushi Road (planned); Pref. Route 63 (Shibushi Fukuyama Route)	3.7	81.8			Kagoshima	Shibushi
35-1	Shibushi Ariake IC		7.1	78.4			Kagoshima	Shibushi
36	Ōsaki IC	Pref. Route 64 (Ōsaki Kihoku Route)	13.4	72.1			Kagoshima	Ōsaki
37	Kanoya Kushira JCT	Ōsumi Jūkan Road; Pref. Route 552 (Kanoya Kushira Interchange Route)	22.9	62.6			Kagoshima	Kanoya
37-1	Nogata IC	Pref. Route 64 (Ōsaki Kihoku Route)	29.4	56.1			Kagoshima	Ōsaki
38	Soo Yagorō JCT	Pref. Route 71 (Tarumizu Minaminogō Route)	40.6	44.9			Kagoshima	Soo
39	Sueyoshi Takarabe IC	National Route 10	51.7	33.8			Kagoshima	Soo
	Sueyoshi Takarabe TB		51.7	33.8		Toll Barrier	Kagoshima	Soo
PA	Kokubu PA		68.4	17.1			Kagoshima	Kirishima
40	Kokubu IC	National Route 10	74.2	11.3			Kagoshima	Kirishima
41	Hayato Higashi IC	National Route 10 (Hayato Road); Pref. Route 58 (Hayato Port Route)	79.0	6.5			Kagoshima	Kirishima
42	Hayato Nishi IC	Pref. Route 471 (Kita-Naganoda Obama Route)	82.6	2.9			Kagoshima	Kirishima
(25)	Kajiki IC	National Route 10 (Kajiki Bypass); Pref. Route 55 (Kurino Kajiki Route)	85.1	0.4			Kagoshima	Aira
(25-1)	Kajiki JCT	Kyushu Expressway; National Route 10 (Hayato Road)	85.5	0.0			Kagoshima	Aira
