= Kawaminami Station =

Railway station in Kawaminami, Miyazaki Prefecture, Japan

Kawaminami Station 川南駅
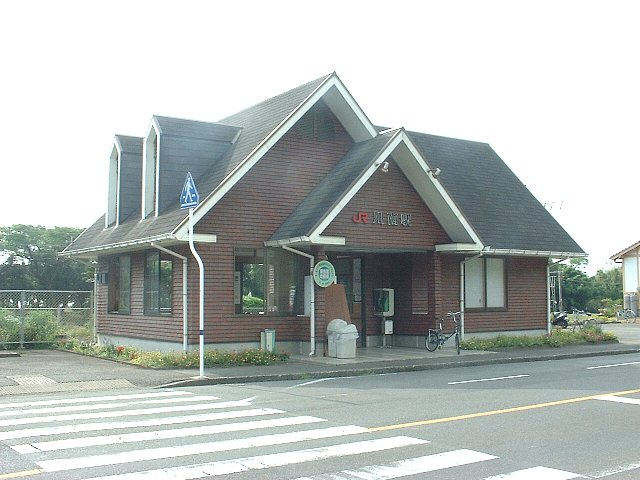
- Kawaminami Station in 2006

General information
- Location: Heida, Kawaminami-cho, Koyu-gun, Miyazaki-ken 889-1302; Japan
- Coordinates: 32°11′31″N 131°33′11″E
- Operator: JR Kyushu
- Line: ■ Nippō Main Line
- Distance: 305.6 km from Kokura
- Platforms: 1 island platform
- Tracks: 2 + 1 siding

Construction
- Structure type: At grade
- Accessible: Yes - level crossing and ramp to platform

Other information
- Status: Kan'i itaku agent on site
- Website: Official website

History
- Opened: 11 June 1921

Passengers
- FY2016: 291 daily

Services
| Preceding station | JR Kyushu | Following station |
|---|---|---|
| Takanabe towards Kagoshima | Nippō Main Line | Tsuno towards Kokura |
Location
- Location within Miyazaki Prefecture Location within Japan

Kawaminami Station (川南駅, Kawaminami-eki) is a passenger railway station located in the town of Kawaminami, Miyazaki, Japan. It is operated by JR Kyushu and is on the Nippō Main Line.

== Lines ==
The station is served by the Nippō Main Line and is located 305.6 km from the starting point of the line at Kokura.

== Layout ==
The station consists of an island platform serving two tracks at grade with a siding. The station building is a modern timber structure built in western style to resemble a mountain cabin. It houses a staffed ticket window and a waiting area. Access to the island platform is by means of a level crossing with ramps at both ends. The station is not staffed by JR Kyushu but some types of tickets are available from a kan'i itaku agent on site who staffs the ticket window.

=== Platforms ===
| 1 | ■ ■ Nippō Main Line | for Nobeoka for Miyazaki |
| 2 | ■ ■ Nippō Main Line | siding |

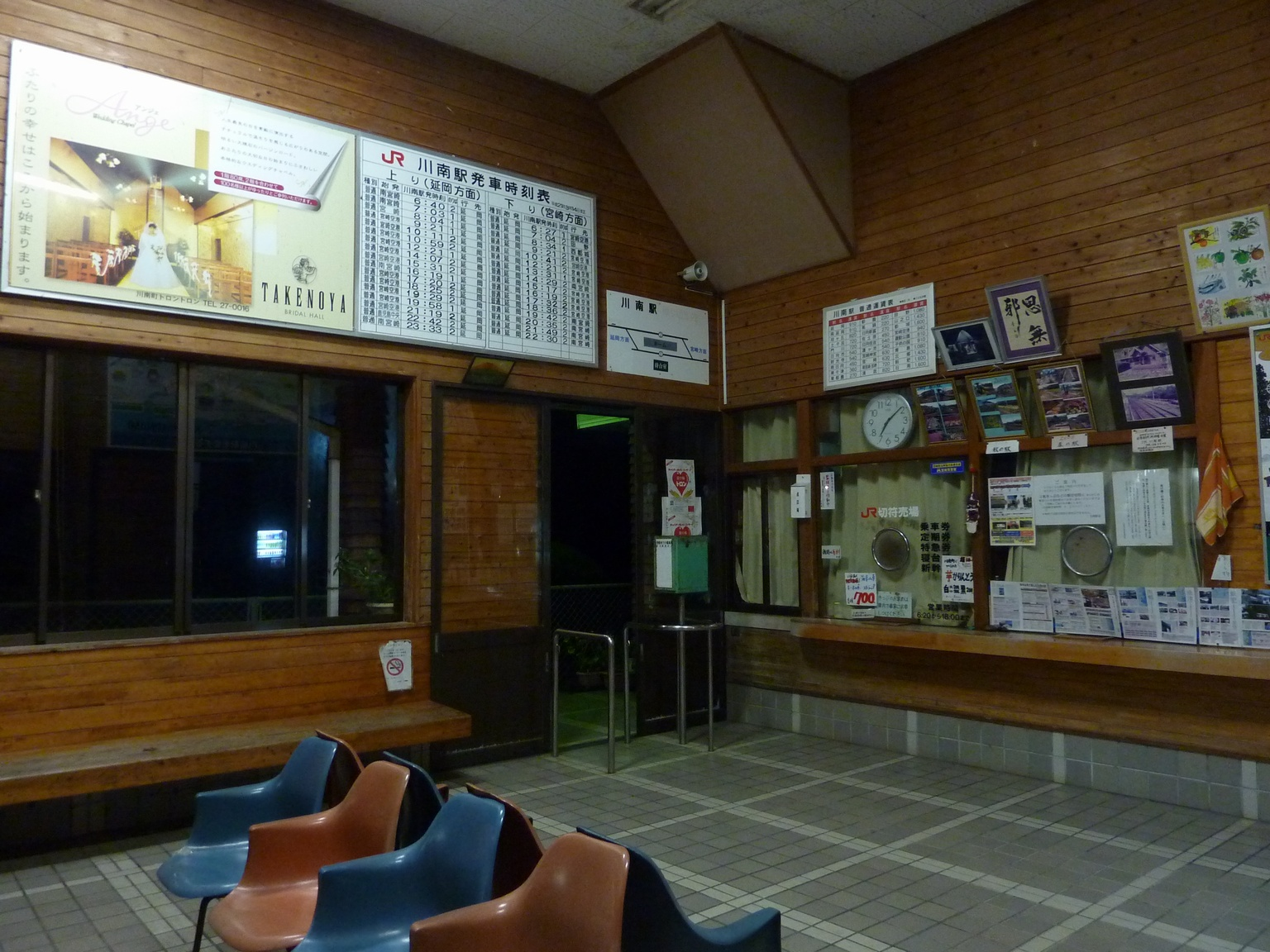
Interior of station building.

== History ==
In 1913, the Miyazaki Prefectural Railway (宮崎県営鉄道) had opened a line from Miyazaki northwards to Hirose (now closed). After the Miyazaki Prefectural Railway was nationalized on 21 September 1917, Japanese Government Railways (JGR) undertook the subsequent extension of the track as part of the then Miyazaki Main Line, reaching Takanabe by 11 September 1920. In the next phase of expansion, the track was extended to Mimitsu, which opened as the new northern terminus on 11 June 1921. Kawaminami was opened on the same day as an intermediate station on the new track. Expanding north from Mimitsu in phases and joining up with other networks, the track eventually reached Kokura and the entire stretch from Kokura through this station to Miyakonojō was redesignated as the Nippō Main Line on 15 December 1923. With the privatization of Japanese National Railways (JNR), the successor of JGR, on 1 April 1987, the station came under the control of JR Kyushu.

== Surrounding area ==
The center of Kawaminami Town is located inland, about 3 kilometers west of this station, and there are only a few private houses and no commercial facilities around the station.

== Passenger statistics ==
In fiscal 2016, the station was used by an average of 291 passengers (boarding only) per day.

== See also ==
- List of railway stations in Japan
