= Takanabe, Miyazaki =

Takanabe 高鍋町
- Town
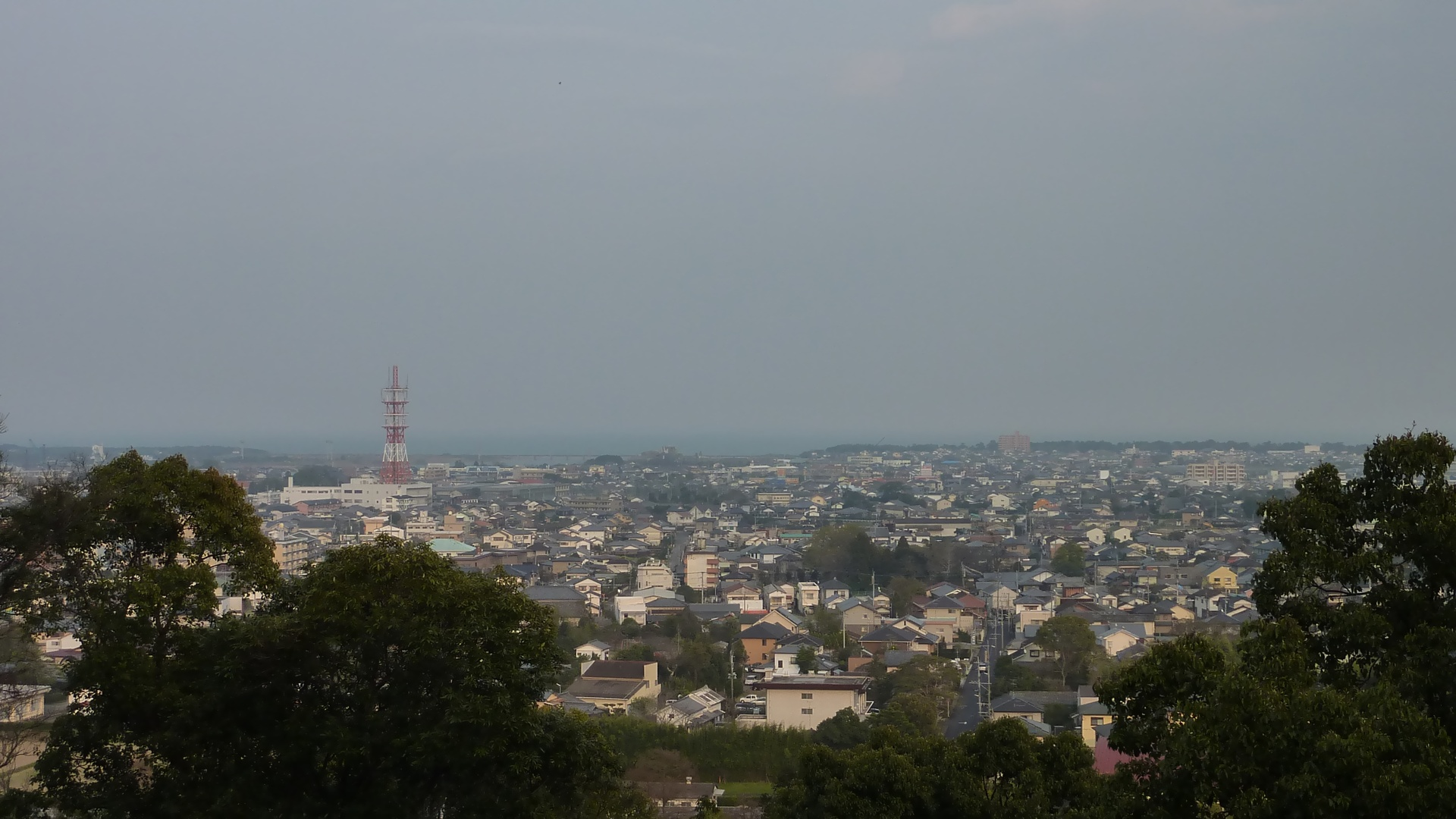
- View of Takanabe

- Flag Seal
- Location of Takanabe in Miyazaki Prefecture

- Location in Japan
- Coordinates: 32°07′41″N 131°30′12″E
- Country: Japan
- Region: Kyushu
- Prefecture: Miyazaki
- District: Koyu

Area
  - Total: 43.80 km^{2} (16.91 sq mi)

Population (October 1, 2023)
  - Total: 19,242
  - Density: 439.3/km^{2} (1,138/sq mi)
- Time zone: UTC+09:00 (JST)
- City hall address: 8437 Kamie, Takanabe-cho, Koyu-gun, Miyazaki-ken 884-8655
- Website: Official website
- Symbols
- Flower: Dianthus
- Tree: Osmanthus fragrans

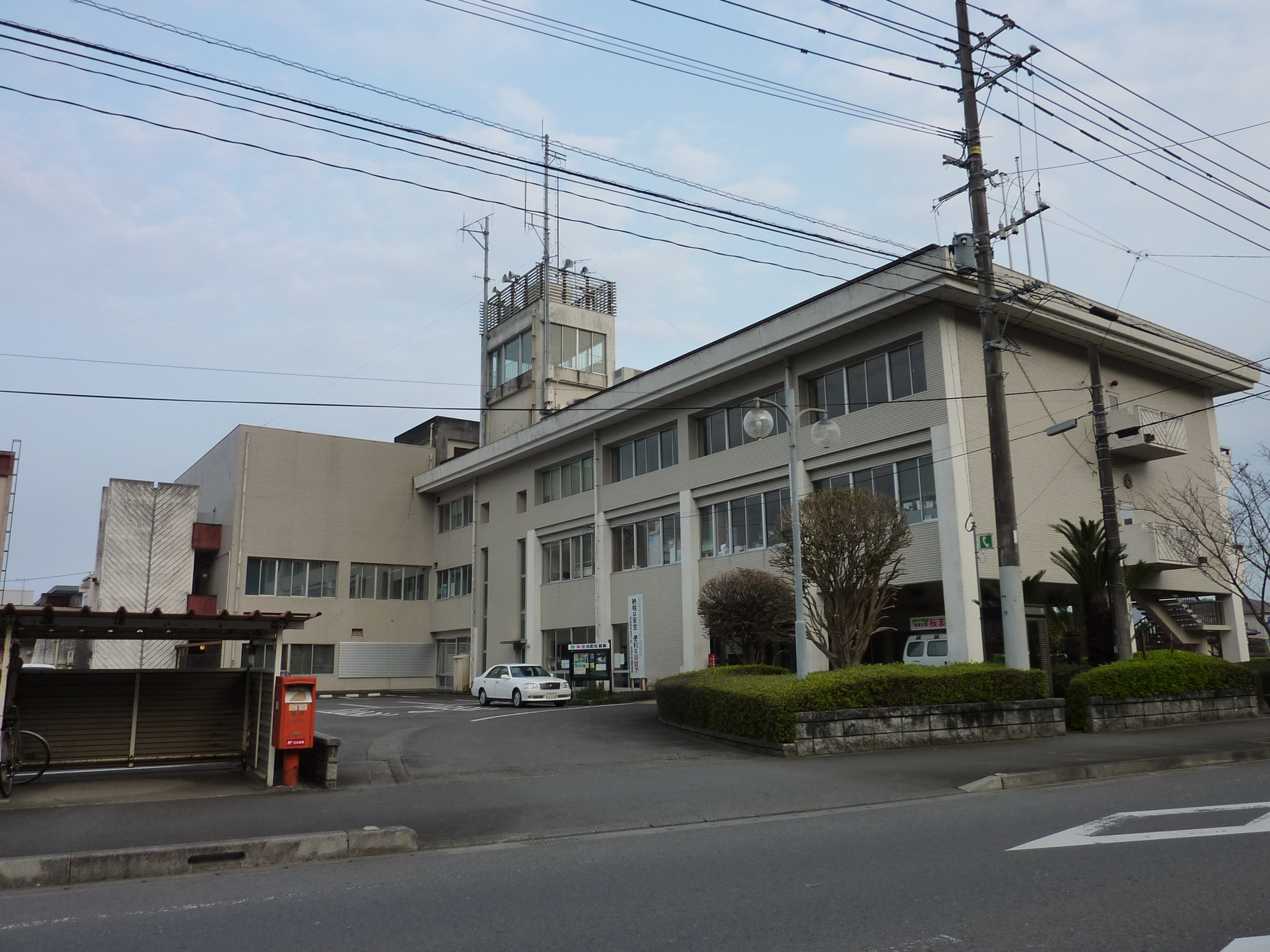
Takanabe Town Hall

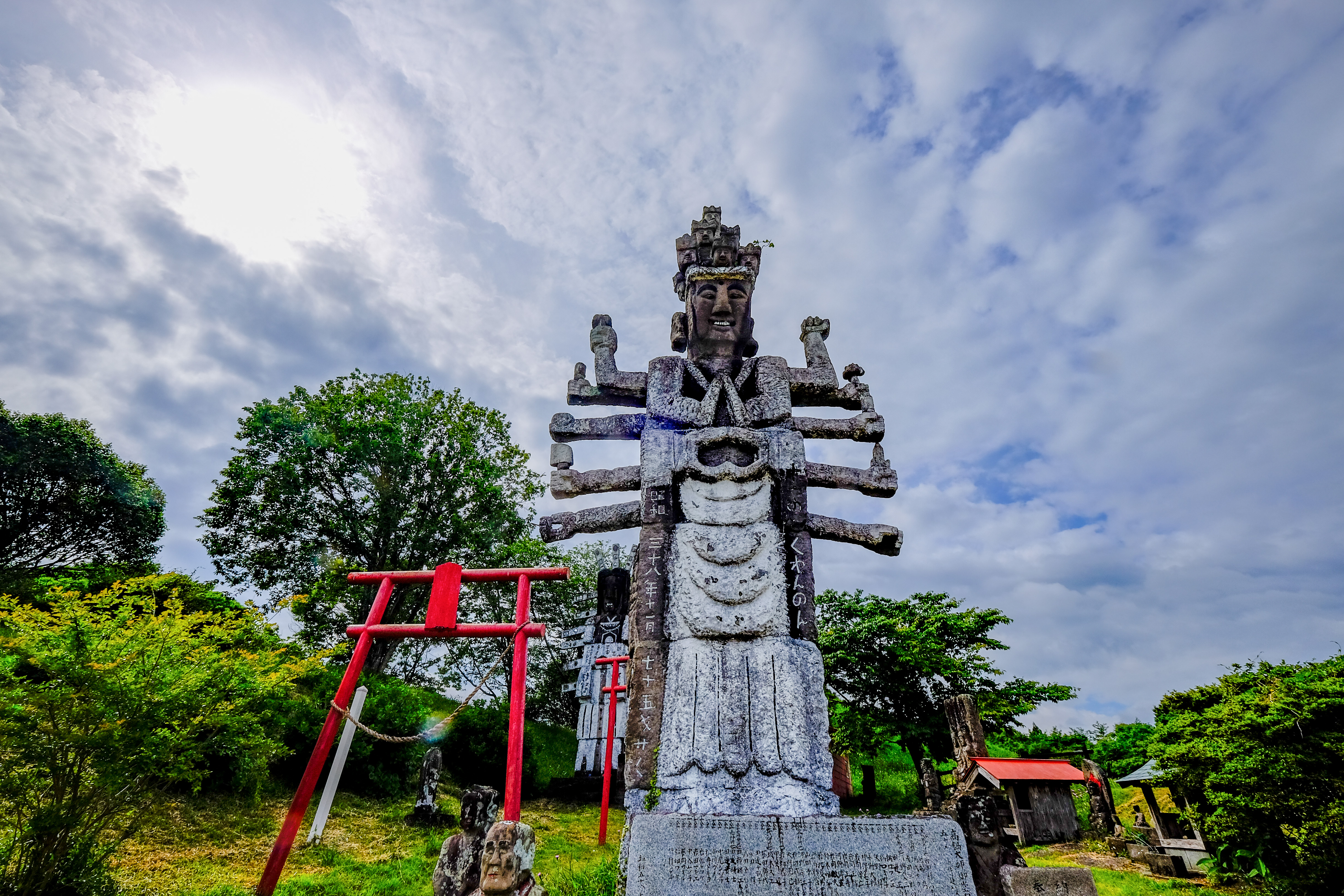
Takanabe Daishi

Takanabe (高鍋町, Takanabe-chō) is a town located in Koyu District, Miyazaki Prefecture, Kyushu, Japan. As of 1 October 2023, the town had an estimated population of 19242 in 8650 households, and a population density of 160 persons per km^{2}. The total area of the town is 43.80 square kilometres (16.91 sq mi).

== Geography ==
Takanabe is located in the northern part of the Miyazaki Plain, the Komaru River flows through the center and empties into the Hyūga Sea which forms the eastern border of the town. There are only alluvial plains and diluvial plateaus, and the area is generally flat.

=== Neighbouring municipalities ===
Miyazaki Prefecture

- Kawaminami
- Kijō
- Saito
- Shintomi

=== Climate ===
Takanabe has a humid subtropical climate (Köppen Cfa) characterized by warm summers and cool winters with light to no snowfall. The average annual temperature in Takanabe is 16.4 °C. The average annual rainfall is 2234 mm with September as the wettest month. The temperatures are highest on average in August, at around 26.1 °C, and lowest in January, at around 6.5 °C.

=== Demographics ===
Per Japanese census data, the population of Takanabe is as shown below

Historical population
Year	Pop.	±%
1950	14,434	—
1960	20,106	+39.3%
1970	20,041	−0.3%
1980	19,777	−1.3%
1990	22,950	+16.0%
2000	22,970	+0.1%
2010	22,748	−1.0%
2020	21,736	−4.4%

== History ==
The area of Takanabe was part of ancient Hyūga Province. The area was under the control of the Akizuki clan from the end of the Sengoku period, who ruled Takanabe Domain under the Edo period Tokugawa shogunate. The town developed as a jōkamachi around Takanabe Castle. The village of Takanabe within Koyu District, Miyazaki was established on April 1, 1889, with the creation of the modern municipalities system. It was raised to town status on February 7, 1901.

== Government ==
Takanabe has a mayor-council form of government with a directly elected mayor and a unicameral town council of 14 members. Takanabe, collectively with the other municipalities of Koyu District contributes three members to the Miyazaki Prefectural Assembly. In terms of national politics, the town is part of the Miyazaki 2nd district of the lower house of the Diet of Japan.

== Economy ==
The main industry of Takanabe is agriculture, mainly livestock, including pig and poultry farming.

== Education ==
Takanabe has two public elementary schools and two public junior high schools operated by the town government, and two public high schools operated by the Miyazaki Prefectural Board of Education.

== Transportation ==
=== Railways ===
JR Kyushu - Nippō Main Line

- Takanabe

=== Highways ===
- Higashikyushu Expressway
- National Route 10

== Local attractions ==
- Mochida Kofun Cluster, National Historic Site
- Ruins of Takanabe Castle
- Takanabe Daishi temple

== Notable people from Takanabe ==
- Sky Brown, professional skateboarder
- Miki Imai, pop singer and actress
- Kaneshiro Kofuku, sumo wrestler
- Akizuki Satsuo, diplomat
