= Kawaminami, Miyazaki =

Kawaminami 川南町
- Town
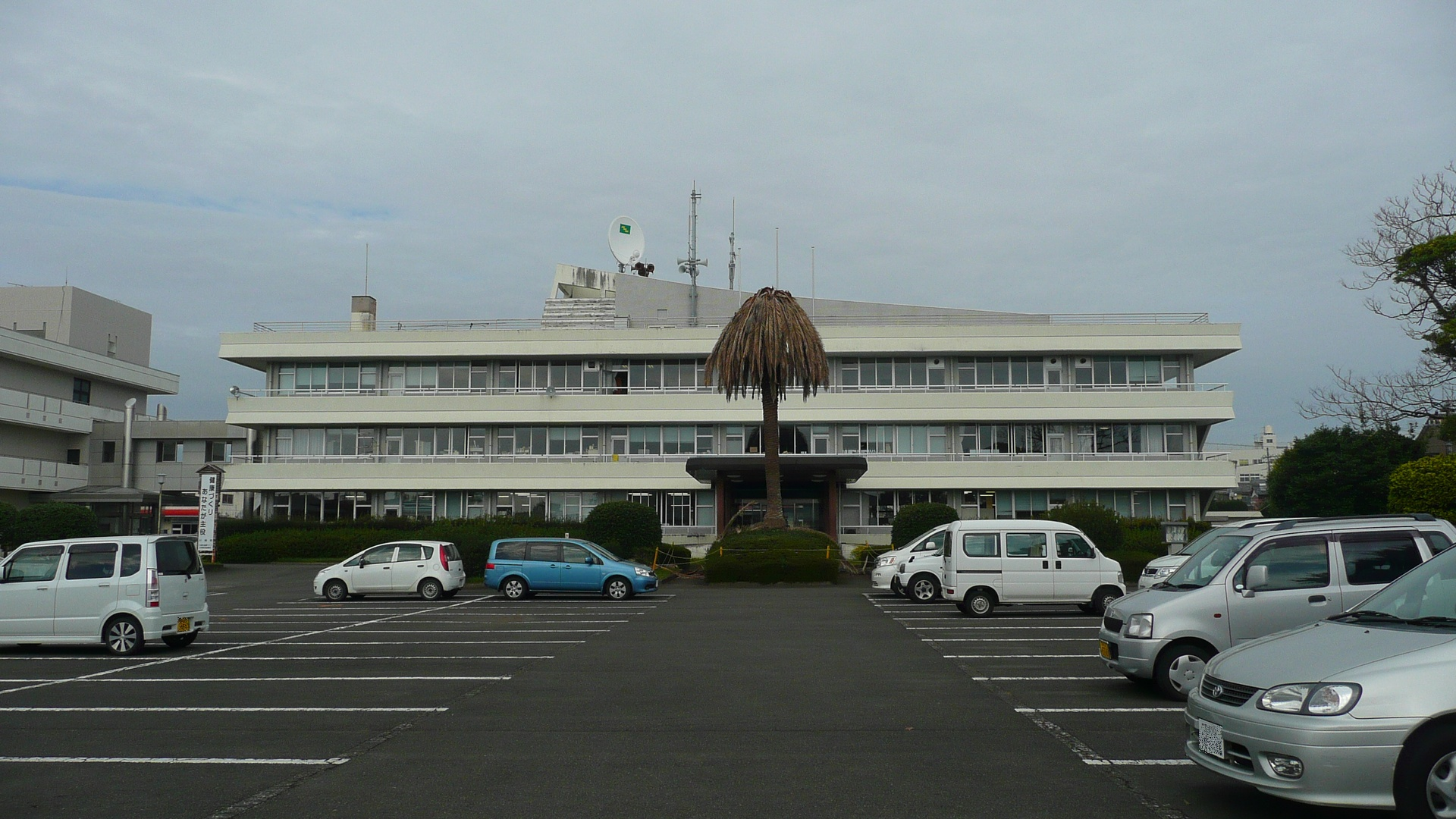
- Kawaminami Town Hall

- Flag Emblem
- Interactive map of Kawaminami
- Location in Japan
- Coordinates: 32°11′31″N 131°31′33″E
- Country: Japan
- Region: Kyushu
- Prefecture: Miyazaki
- District: Koyu

Area
  - Total: 90.12 km^{2} (34.80 sq mi)

Population (September 1, 2023)
  - Total: 14,647
  - Density: 162.5/km^{2} (420.9/sq mi)
- Time zone: UTC+09:00 (JST)
- City hall address: 13680-1 Kawaminami, Kawaminami-cho, Koyu-gun, Miyazaki-ken 889-1301
- Website: Official website
- Symbols
- Tree: Camellia sasanqua

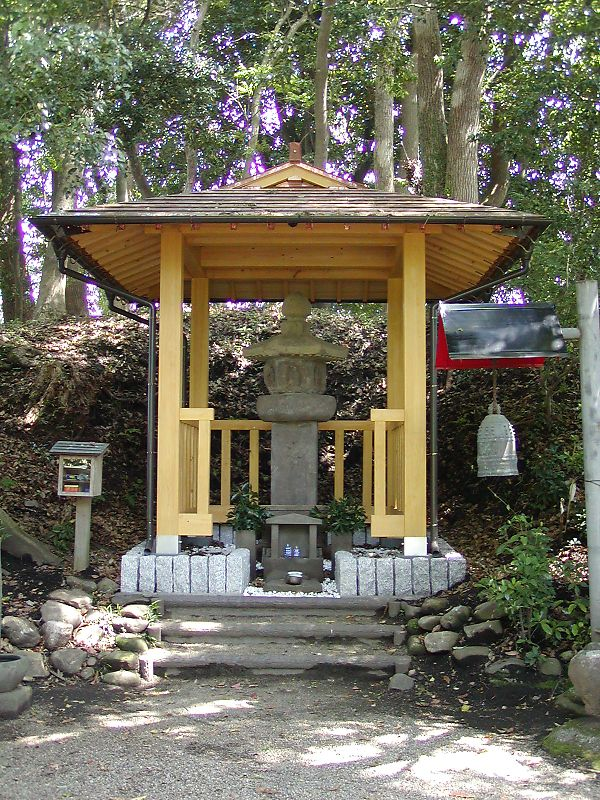
Sōrinbaru kuyōtō

Kawaminami (川南町, Kawaminami-chō) is a town located in Koyu District, Miyazaki Prefecture, Japan. As of 1 September 2023, the town had an estimated population of 14,647 in 6,075 households, and a population density of 160 persons per km^{2}. The total area of the town is 145.96 square kilometres (56.36 sq mi).

== Geography ==
Kawaminami is located in the north-central part of Miyazaki Prefecture, approximately 35 kilometers, about 35 km northeast of Miyazaki City. Part of the west side is the Osuzu Mountains, and the rest is a river terrace that approaches the coast of the Hyūga Sea. The Hirata River flows through the center of the town, and the Nanuki River flows through the northern end of the town. The town's name, Kawanami, comes from the southern part of the Nanuki River. The hilly area that occupies much of the town is arid, and remained largely undeveloped for many years until full-scale development began after World War II.

=== Neighbouring municipalities ===
Miyazaki Prefecture

- Kijo
- Takanabe
- Tsuno

=== Climate ===
Kawaminami has a humid subtropical climate (Köppen Cfa) characterized by warm summers and cool winters with light to no snowfall. The average annual temperature in Kawaminami is 16.4 °C. The average annual rainfall is 2234 mm with September as the wettest month. The temperatures are highest on average in August, at around 26.1 °C, and lowest in January, at around 6.5 °C.

=== Demographics ===
Per Japanese census data, the population of Kawaminami is as shown below

Historical population
Year	Pop.	±%
1950	10,404	—
1960	19,567	+88.1%
1970	19,294	−1.4%
1980	16,707	−13.4%
1990	18,026	+7.9%
2000	18,371	+1.9%
2010	17,630	−4.0%
2020	17,012	−3.5%

== History ==
The area of Kawaminami was part of ancient Hyūga Province. The area was under the control of the Shimazu clan from the Nanboku-chō period, and was a contested borderland fought over many times during the Sengoku period. During the Edo period, During the Meiji period, the ex-samurai of Takanabe Domain built irrigation canals to develop new rice fields, and large-scale farm development was carried out by gathering farmers from inside and outside the prefecture, but most of the area remained undeveloped, and there were constant conflicts over water. Before World War II, much of the hilly land was acquired to provide fodder and grazing land for warhorses. In the fall 1941, the training range for the Imperial Japanese Army Airborne Regiment was moved from Manchukuo to Kawaminami, which became the site for parachute training. Post-war, despite the difficult conditions for agriculture, settlers came from all prefectures, so the town came to be nicknamed the "Kawaminami United States". The village of Kawaminami within Koyu District, Miyazaki, was established on April 1, 1889, with the creation of the modern municipalities system. It was raised to town status on February 11, 1953.

== Government ==
Kawaminami has a mayor-council form of government with a directly elected mayor and a unicameral town council of 13 members. Kawaminami, collectively with the other municipalities of Koyu District contributes three members to the Miyazaki Prefectural Assembly. In terms of national politics, the town is part of the Miyazaki 2nd district of the lower house of the Diet of Japan.

== Economy ==
The main industry of Kawaminami is large-scale agriculture, mainly livestock, is carried out on the vast plateau. The Shiotsuke Industrial Park in the northern part of the town is the largest industrial park in the prefecture.

== Education ==
Kawaminami has five public elementary schools and two public junior high schools operated by the town government. The town does not have a high school.

== Transportation ==
=== Railways ===
JR Kyushu - Nippō Main Line

- Kawaminami

=== Highways ===
- Higashikyushu Expressway
- National Route 10

== Local attractions ==
- Kawaminami Kofun Cluster, National Historic Site
- Sōrinbaru kuyōtō, National Historic Site
