= Tsuno, Miyazaki =

Tsuno 都農町
- Town
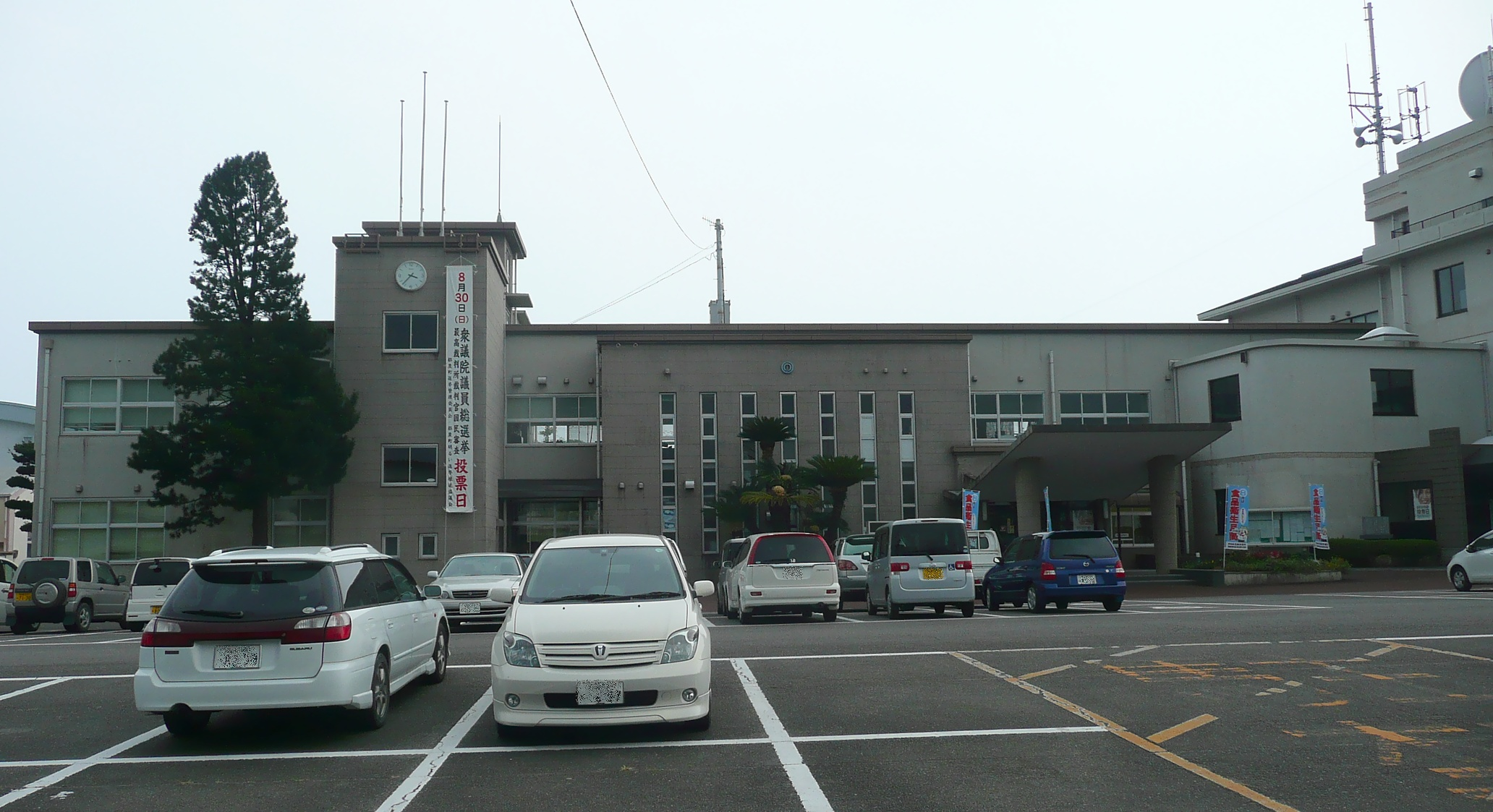
- Tsuno Town Hall

- Flag Seal
- Location of Tsuno in Miyazaki Prefecture

- Location in Japan
- Coordinates: 32°15′23″N 131°33′35″E
- Country: Japan
- Region: Kyushu
- Prefecture: Miyazaki
- District: Koyu

Area
  - Total: 102.11 km^{2} (39.42 sq mi)

Population (October 1, 2023)
  - Total: 9,577
  - Density: 93.79/km^{2} (242.9/sq mi)
- Time zone: UTC+09:00 (JST)
- City hall address: 4874-2 Kawakita, Tsuno-cho, Koyu-gun, Miyazaki-ken 889-1201
- Website: Official website
- Symbols
- Bird: Japanese white-eye
- Flower: Orchidaceae
- Tree: Ginkgo biloba

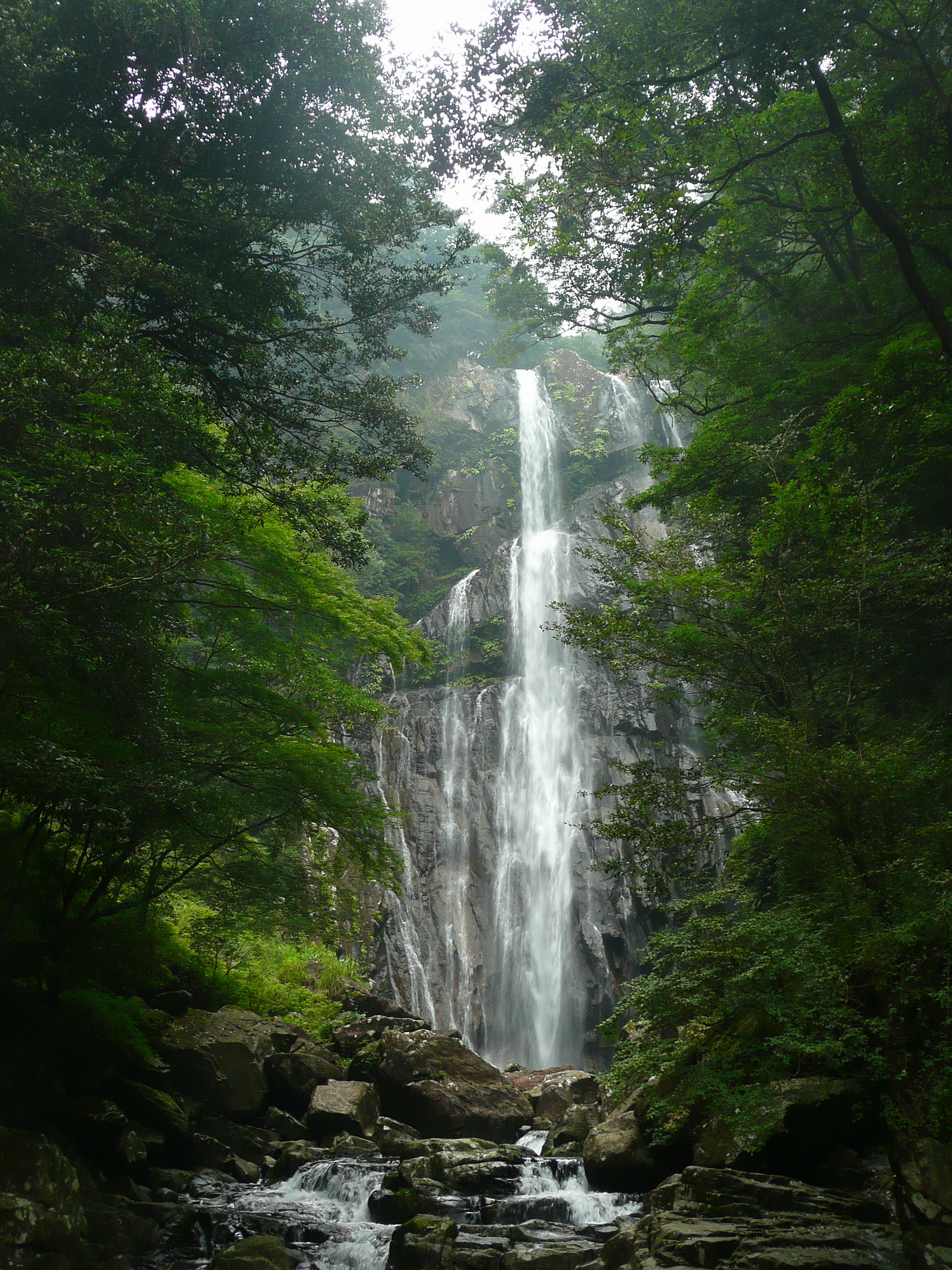
Yatogi Falls

Tsuno (都農町, Tsuno-chō) is a town located in Koyu District, Miyazaki Prefecture, Japan. As of 1 October 2023, the town has an estimated population of 9,577 in 3997 households, and a population density of 94 persons per km². The total area of the town is 145.96 square kilometres (56.36 sq mi).

== Geography ==
Tsuno is located in the central eastern part of Miyazaki Prefecture, approximately 40 kilometers north-northeast of Miyazaki City. The town is long from east-to-west, measuring 15 kilometers from east-to-west and 10 kilometers from north-to-southThe west side is a mountainous area that is part of the Kyushu Mountains, and the east side faces the Hyūga Sea. Approximately 63% of the town's land is forest, and the Osuzu Mountain Range is home to more than 30 large and small waterfalls, including Yatogi Falls, which has been selected as one of Japan's Top 100 Waterfalls.

=== Neighbouring municipalities ===
Miyazaki Prefecture

- Hyuga
- Kawaminami
- Kijo

=== Climate ===
Tsuno has a humid subtropical climate (Köppen Cfa) characterized by warm summers and cool winters with light to no snowfall. The average annual temperature in Tsuno is 15.5 °C. The average annual rainfall is 2234 mm with September as the wettest month. The temperatures are highest on average in August, at around 25.3 °C, and lowest in January, at around 5.6 °C.

=== Demographics ===
Per Japanese census data, the population of Tsuno has been decreasing for the past 30 years.

Historical population
Year	Pop.	±%
1950	11,067	—
1960	15,670	+41.6%
1970	14,524	−7.3%
1980	12,479	−14.1%
1990	13,486	+8.1%
2000	13,229	−1.9%
2010	12,321	−6.9%
2020	11,130	−9.7%

== History ==
The area of Tsuno was part of ancient Hyūga Province. The area was under the control of the Shimazu clan from the Nanboku-chō period, and was a contested borderland fought over many times during the Sengoku period. During the Edo period, it was part of the holdings of Sadowara Domain. The village of Tsuno within Koyu District, Miyazaki was established on April 1, 1889 with the creation of the modern municipalities system. It was raised to town status on August 1, 1920.

== Government ==
Tsuno has a mayor-council form of government with a directly elected mayor and a unicameral town council of 11 members. Tsuno, collectively with the other municipalities of Koyu District contributes three members to the Miyazaki Prefectural Assembly. In terms of national politics, the town is part of the Miyazaki 2nd district of the lower house of the Diet of Japan.

== Economy ==
The main industry of Tsuno is agriculture and food processing.

== Education ==
Tsuno has three public elementary schools and one public junior high school operated by the town government, and one public high school operated by the Miyazaki Prefectural Board of Education.

== Transportation ==
=== Railways ===
JR Kyushu - Nippō Main Line

- Higashi-Tsuno - Tsuno

=== Highways ===
- Higashikyushu Expressway
- National Route 10

== Local attractions ==
- Tsuno Shrine, ichinomiya of Hyūga Province
