= Japan National Route 10 =

National highway in Japan

National Route 10
- 国道10号

Route information
- Length: 454.8 km (282.6 mi)
- Existed: 4 December 1952–present

Major junctions
- North end: National Route 3 in Kitakyushu
- National Route 57; National Route 212; National Route 213; National Route 223
- South end: National Route 3 / National Route 58 / National Route 225 in Kagoshima

Location
- Country: Japan

Highway system
- National highways of Japan; Expressways of Japan
← National Route 9	→ National Route 11

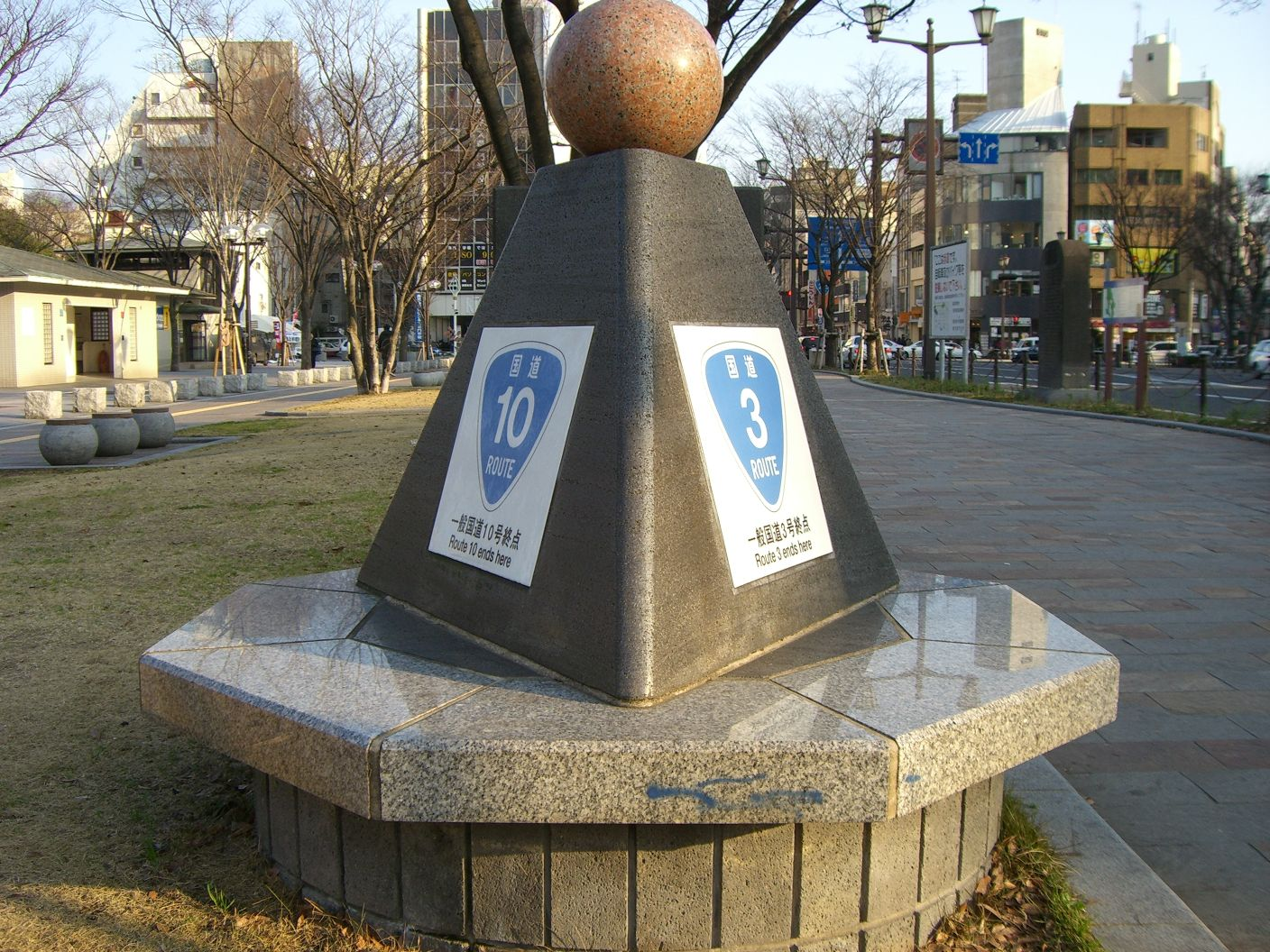
A milestone between Route 10 and Route 3.

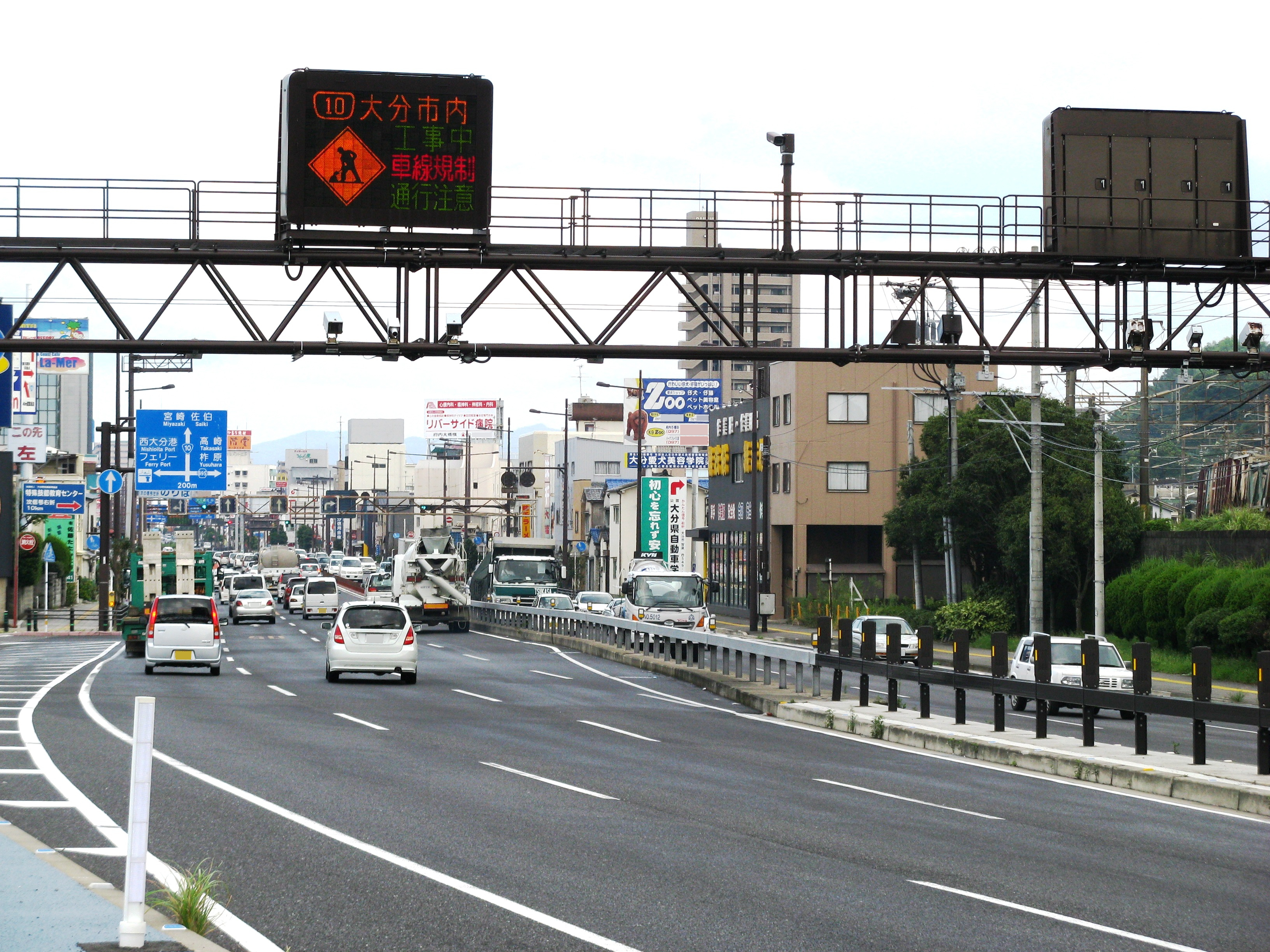
Route 10, Ōita

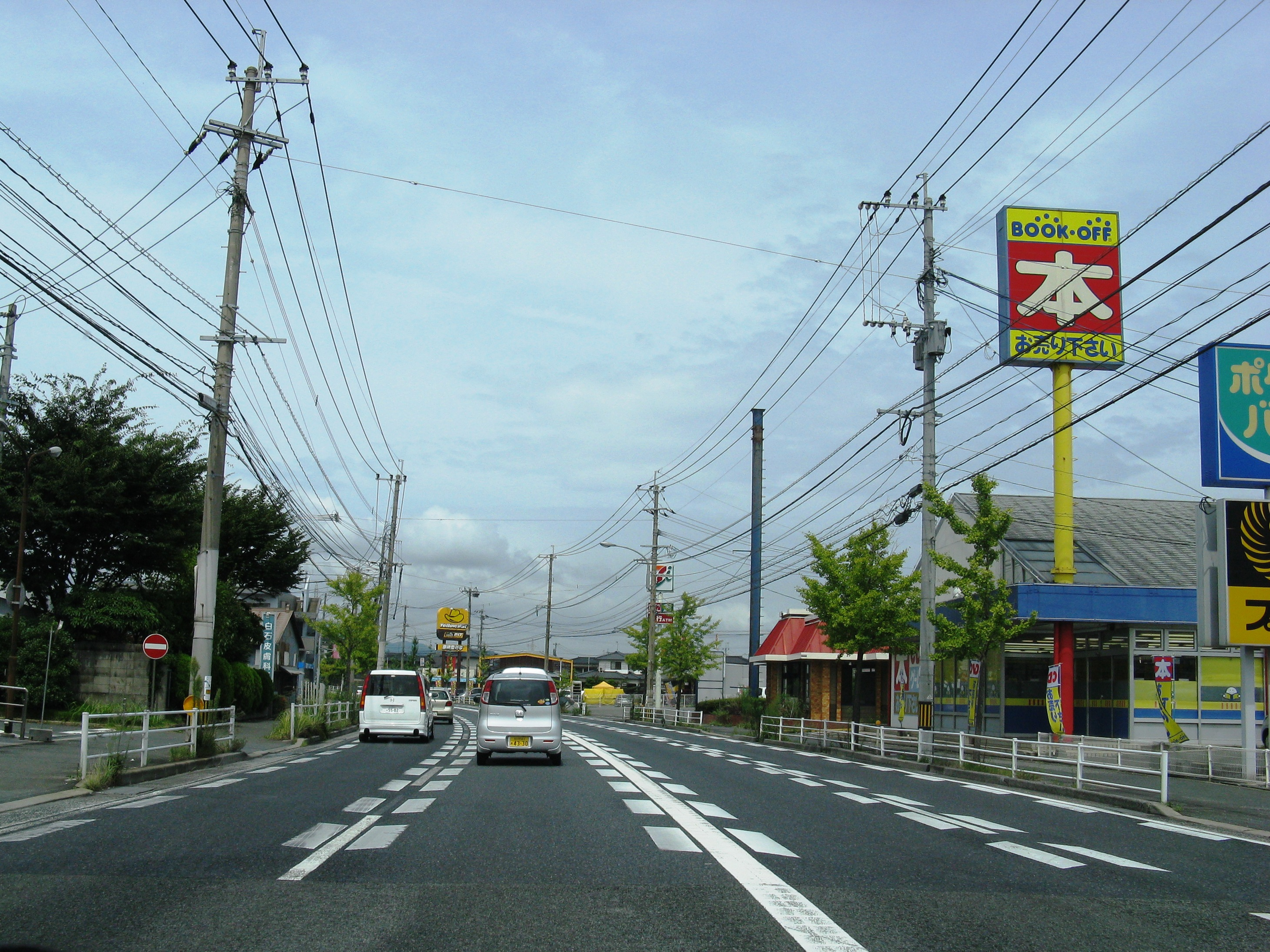
Route 10, Fukuoka, Kanda

National Route 10 (国道10号, Kokudō Jū-gō) is a Japanese highway on the island of Kyushu. It originates at the intersection with Route 2 in Kitakyushu, Furoka and passes through the prefectural capitals of Ōita and Miyazaki, terminating at the intersection with Route 3 in Kagoshima. Route 10 follows the eastern coast along the Inland Sea and the Hyūga Sea. For much of its length, it parallels the JR Kyushu Nippō Main Line. Route 10 measures 454.8 km in length.

== Route data ==
- Length: 454.8 km (282.6 mi)
- Origin: Moji-ku, Kitakyushu (originates at junction with Route 2)
- Terminus: Kagoshima (ends at Junction with Routes 3 and 225)
- Major cities: Kitakyushu, Ōita, Miyazaki, Miyakonojō, Kagoshima

== History ==
- 4 December 1952 - First Class National Highway 10 (from Kitakyushu to Kagoshima)
- 1 April 1965 - General National Highway 10 (from Kitakyushu to Kagoshima)

== Overlapping sections ==
- From Moji-ku, Kitakyushu (Oimatsu-Park intersection) to Kokurakita-ku, Kitakyūshū (Mihagino intersection): Route 3
- From Kokurakita-ku, Kitakyūshū (Mihagino intersection) to Kokuraminami-ku, Kitakyūshū (Jōno intersection): Route 322
- From Nakatsu to Usa (Iwasaki intersection) and from Hiji (Hori intersection) to Beppu: Route 213
- From Oita (Omichi Cross Bridge North intersection) to Bungo-Ōno Inukai-machi Kubaru (Kubaru intersection): Route 57
- From Oita (Funai Bridge North intersection) to Oita (Miyazaki intersection): Route 210
- From Usuki (Notsu-machi Hinata Crossroad intersection) to Usuki (Notsu-machi Meiji Bridge intersection): Route 502
- From Nobeoka Kitagawa-machi Kawachimyō (Sodachi intersection) to Nobeoka Showa-machi: Route 326
- From Nobeoka Okado-machi to Kadogawa Nakasu: Route 388
- From Miyazaki (Niinazume intersection) to Miyazaki (Tachibana-dori 4 Chome intersection): Route 219
- From Miyakonojō (Miyakonojō Station Entrance intersection) to Miyakonojō (Oiwada intersection): Route 269
- From Kirishima Fukuyama-cho Fukuyama (Makinohara intersection) to Kirishima Hayato Shinkō (junction with Route 223): Route 504

== Municipalities passed through ==
- Fukuoka Prefecture
  - Kitakyushu - Kanda - Yukuhashi - Miyako (part of ‘Shiida Toll Road’ Bypass section) - Chikujō - Buzen - Kōge
- Ōita Prefecture
  - Nakatsu - Usa - Kitsuki - Hiji - Beppu - Ōita - Bungo-Ōno - Usuki - Saiki
- Miyazaki Prefecture
  - Nobeoka - Kadogawa - Hyūga - Tsuno - Kawaminami - Takanabe - Shintomi - Miyazaki - Miyakonojō
- Kagoshima Prefecture
  - Soo - Kirishima - Aira - Kagoshima
