= Takanabe Station =

Railway station in Takanabe, Miyazaki Prefecture, Japan

Takanabe Station 高鍋駅
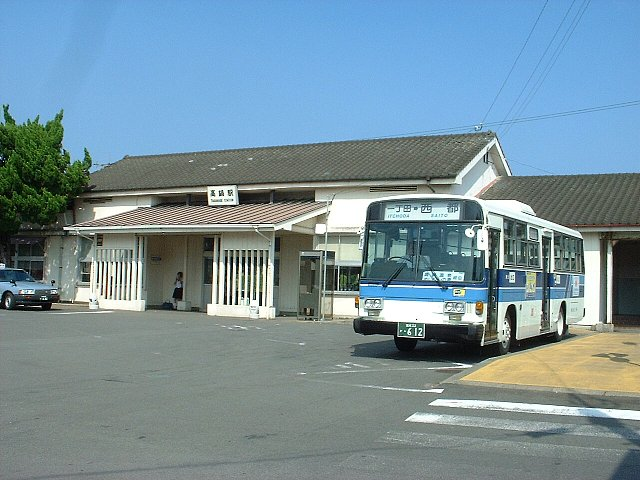
- Takanabe Station in 2005

General information
- Location: 6211 Kaguchiura, Takanabe-cho, Koyu-gun, Miyazaki-ken 884-0004; Japan
- Coordinates: 32°07′20″N 131°32′01″E
- Operator: JR Kyushu
- Line: ■ Nippō Main Line
- Distance: 313.6 km from Kokura
- Platforms: 1 island platform
- Tracks: 2 + 1 passing loop and 1 siding
- Connections: Bus terminal

Construction
- Structure type: At grade
- Accessible: No - island platformed accessed by footbridge

Other information
- Status: Staffed (Midori no Madoguchi) (outsourced)
- Website: Official website

History
- Opened: 11 September 1920

Passengers
- FY2016: 799 daily
- Rank: 192nd (among JR Kyushu stations)

Services
Preceding station	JR Kyushu	Following station
Hyūga-Shintomi towards Kagoshima	Nippō Main Line	Kawaminami towards Kokura
Location
- Location within Miyazaki Prefecture Location within Japan

Takanabe Station (高鍋駅, Takanabe-eki) is a passenger railway station located in the town of Takanabe, Miyazaki, Japan. It is operated by JR Kyushu and is on the Nippō Main Line. Until 1984, it was a junction for the now closed Tsuma Line.

== Lines ==
The station is served by the Nippō Main Line and is located 313.6 km from the starting point of the line at Kokura.

== Layout ==
The station consists of an island platform serving two tracks at grade with a passing loop and siding branching off track 2. The station building is a wooden structure in traditional Japanese style with a tiled roof. It houses a staffed ticket window, a waiting area, an automatic ticket vending machine and a shop selling local produce. Access to the island platform is by means of a covered footbridge.

Management of the passenger facilities at the station has been outsourced to the JR Kyushu Tetsudou Eigyou Co., a wholly owned subsidiary of JR Kyushu specialising in station services. It staffs the ticket booth which is equipped with a Midori no Madoguchi facility.

=== Platforms ===
1, 2	■ ■ Nippō Main Line	for Nobeoka for Miyazaki

== History ==
In 1913, the Miyazaki Prefectural Railway (宮崎県営鉄道) had opened a line from Miyazaki northwards to Hirose (now closed). After the Miyazaki Prefectural Railway was nationalized on 21 September 1917, Japanese Government Railways (JGR) undertook the subsequent extension of the track as part of the then Miyazaki Main Line. In the first phase of expansion, the track from Jirogabyū (now Hyūga-Sumiyoshi forked off from the track to Hirose and extended north, with Takanabe which opened on 11 September 1920 as the new northern terminus. Takanabe became a through station on 11 June 1921 when the track was further extended to Mimitsu. Expanding north in phases and joining up with other networks, the track eventually reached Kokura and the entire stretch from Kokura through Takanabe to Miyakonojō was redesignated as the Nippō Main Line on 15 December 1923. The original station building was destroyed on July 16, 1945 by an air raid in World War II, and was rebuilt in 1947. Freight service and baggage handling were discontinued in 1985. With the privatization of Japanese National Railways (JNR), the successor of JGR, on 1 April 1987, the station came under the control of JR Kyushu.

== Surrounding area ==
The station is located near the coast at the eastern end of the town. Facilities such as the town hall, Maizuru Park, Takanabe Town Museum of Art, Takanabe Town Historical Museum, and Miyazaki Prefectural Takanabe Agricultural High School are located in the center of the town, but they are approximately 2 kilometers away from the station.

== Passenger statistics ==
In fiscal 2016, the station was used by an average of 799 passengers daily (boarding passengers only), and it ranked 192nd among the busiest stations of JR Kyushu.

== See also ==
- List of railway stations in Japan
