= Takasaki Shinden Station =

Railway station in Miyakonojō, Miyazaki Prefecture, Japan

Takasaki Shinden Station 高崎新田駅
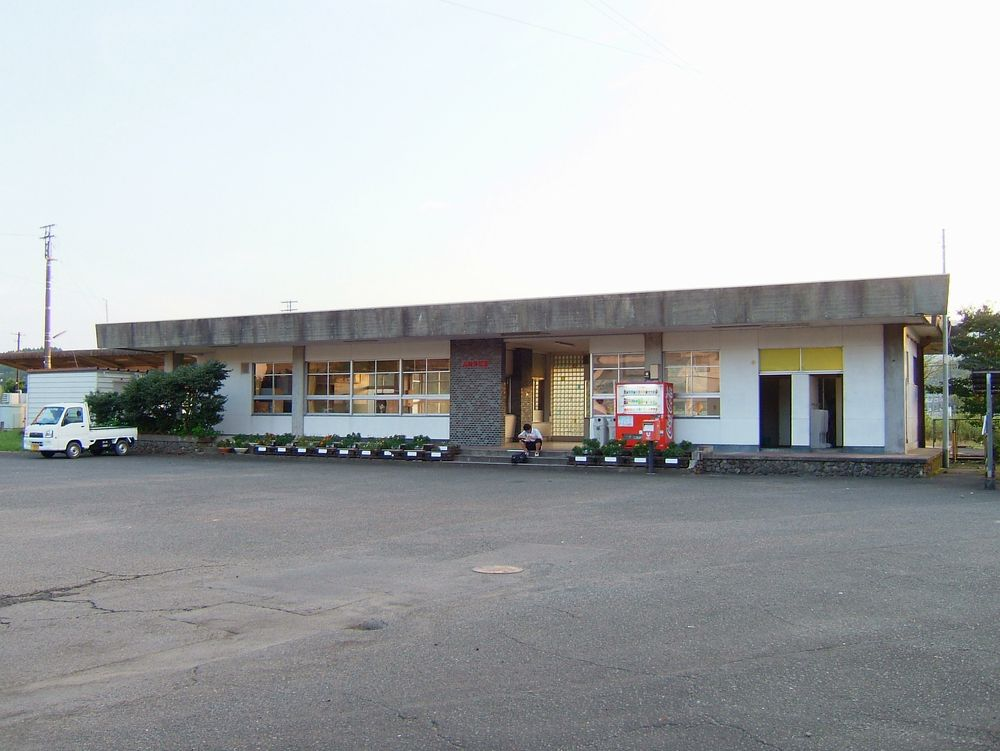
- Takasaki Shinden Station in 2006

General information
- Location: Takazakicho Maeda, Miyakonojō-shi, Miyazaki-ken 889-4506; Japan
- Coordinates: 31°52′34″N 131°03′45″E
- Operator: JR Kyushu
- Line: ■ Kitto Line
- Distance: 17.8 from km Miyakonojō
- Platforms: 1 island platform
- Tracks: 2 + 1 siding

Construction
- Structure type: At grade
- Parking: Available at forecourt
- Cycle facilities: Bike shed
- Accessible: Yes - level crossing and ramp to platform

Other information
- Status: Unstaffed
- Website: Official website

History
- Opened: 11 May 1913

Passengers
- FY2016: 65 daily

Services
Preceding station	JR Kyushu	Following station
Hyūga Maeda towards Yoshimatsu	Kitto Line	Higashi Takasaki towards Miyakonojō
Location
- Location within Miyazaki Prefecture Location within Japan

Takasaki Shinden Station (高崎新田駅, Takasaki Shinden-eki) is a passenger railway station located in the city of Miyakonojō, Miyazaki Prefecture, Japan. It is operated by JR Kyushu.

== Lines ==
The station is served by the Kitto Line and is located 17.8 km from the starting point of the line at Miyakonojō.

== Layout ==
The station consists of an island platform serving two tracks at grade with a siding. The station building is a modern flat-roofed concrete structure; formerly staffed, it is now unattended and now serves only as a waiting room. A level crossing and ramp leads to the island platform. Parking and bike sheds are available at the station forecourt.

=== Platforms ===
1	■ ■ Kitto Line	for Miyakonojō and Miyazaki
2	■ ■ Kitto Line	for Yoshimatsu and Hayato

== History ==
Japanese Government Railways (JGR) opened what it then designated as the Miyazaki Line between Yoshimatsu and Kobayashi (then named Kobayashimachi) on 1 October 1912. In the second phase of expansion, the track was extended southeast to Tanigashira which opened as the eastern terminus on 11 May 1913. Takasaki Shinden opened on the same day as one of several intermediate stations on the new track. On 15 December 1923, the stretch of track between Yoshimatsu and Miyakonojō which included Takasaki Shinden, was designated as part of the Nippō Main Line. On 6 December 1932, the same stretch was separated out and was designated as the Kitto Line with Miyakonojō as the starting point. The current station building was completed in 1969. Freight services were discontinued in 1980 and baggage handling in 1984. With the privatization of Japanese National Railways (JNR), the successor of JGR, on 1 April 1987, Takasaki Shinden came under the control of JR Kyushu.

== Passenger statistics ==
In fiscal 2016, the station was used by an average of 75 passengers (boarding only) per day.

== Surrounding area ==
- Miyakonojo City Hall Takasaki General Branch (formerly Takasaki Town Hall)
- Miyakonojo City Takasaki Elementary School

== See also ==
- List of railway stations in Japan
