= Ebino Station =

Railway station in Ebino, Miyazaki Prefecture, Japan

Ebino Station えびの駅
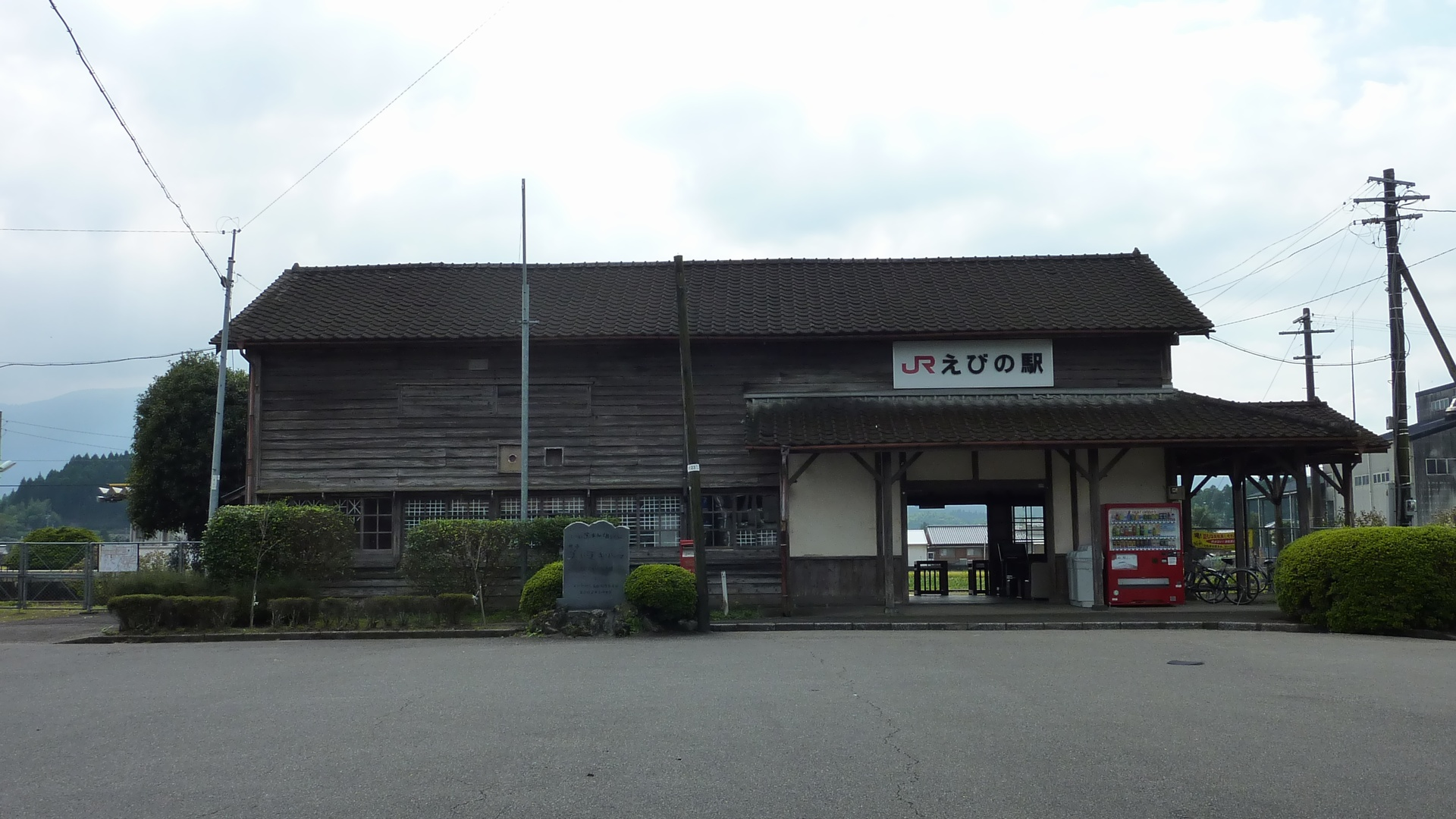
- Ebino Station in 2010

General information
- Location: 162 Kurishita, Ebino-shi, Miyazaki-ken 889-4221; Japan
- Coordinates: 32°02′33″N 130°48′56″E
- Operator: JR Kyushu
- Line: ■ Kitto Line
- Distance: 52.0 km from Miyakonojō
- Platforms: 1 island platform
- Tracks: 2

Construction
- Structure type: At grade
- Parking: Available at forecourt
- Cycle facilities: Bike shed
- Accessible: Yes - level crossing and ramps to platform

Other information
- Status: Unstaffed
- Website: Official website

History
- Opened: 1 October 1912
- Former names: Kakutō (until 1 November 1990)

Passengers
- FY2016: 79 daily

Services
Preceding station	JR Kyushu	Following station
Kyōmachi Onsen towards Yoshimatsu	Kitto Line	Ebino Uwae towards Miyakonojō
Location
- Location within Miyazaki Prefecture Location within Japan

Ebino Station (えびの駅, Ebino-eki) is a passenger railway station located in the city of Ebino, Miyazaki Prefecture, Japan. It is operated by JR Kyushu and is on the Kitto Line.

== Lines ==
The station is served by the Kitto Line and is located 52.0 km from the starting point of the line at Miyakonojō.

== Layout ==
The station consists of an island platform serving two tracks at grade. The station building is the original timber structure in traditional Japanese style from the time the station was opened in 1912 during the Taisho period. It has become unstaffed and now serves only as a waiting room. Access to the island platform is by means of a level crossing with ramps. Parking and a bike shed are available at the forecourt.

=== Platforms ===
1	■ ■ Kitto Line	for Miyakonojō and Miyazaki
2	■ ■ Kitto Line	for Yoshimatsu and Hayato

== History ==
On 1 October 1912, Japanese Government Railways (JGR) opened a track between Yoshimatsu and Kobayashi (then named Kobayashimachi) during the first phase of construction of what it then designated as the Miyazaki Line. Ebino (at that time named Kakutō Station (加久藤駅)) was opened on the same day as one of several intermediate stations along the track. On 15 December 1923, the stretch of track between Yoshimatsu and Miyakonojō which included Kakutō, was designated as part of the Nippō Main Line. On 6 December 1932, the same stretch was separated out and was designated as the Kitto Line with Miyakonojō as the starting point. Freight operations were discontinued in 1962 and baggage handling in 1984. With the privatization of Japanese National Railways (JNR), the successor of JGR, on 1 April 1987, Kakutō came under the control of JR Kyushu. On 1 November 1990, Kakutō was renamed Ebino.

On 25 April 2014, the station building gained protected status as a Registered Tangible Cultural Property.

== Passenger statistics ==
In fiscal 2016, the station was used by an average of 79 passengers (boarding only) per day.

== Surrounding area ==
- Ebino City Hall
- Nissho Gakuen Kyushu International High School
- Ebino City Kakuto Junior High School
- Ebino City Kakuto Elementary School

== See also ==
- List of railway stations in Japan
