= Kyōmachi Onsen Station =

Railway station in Ebino, Miyazaki Prefecture, Japan

Kyōmachi Onsen Station 京町温泉駅
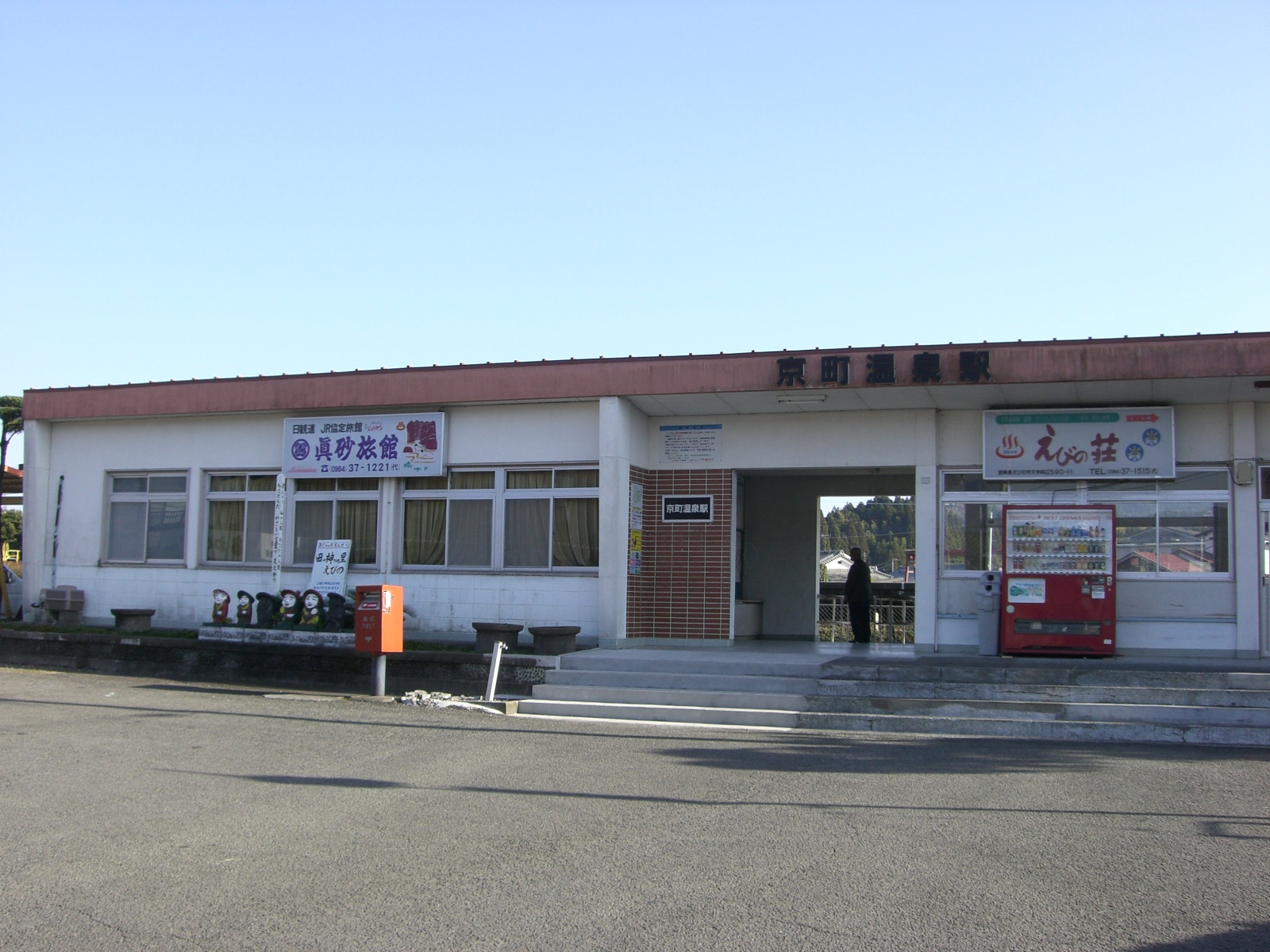
- Kyōmachi Onsen Station in 2007

General information
- Location: 590 Mukae, Ebino-shi, Miyazaki-ken 889-415; Japan
- Coordinates: 32°02′43″N 130°46′02″E
- Operator: JR Kyushu
- Line: ■ Kitto Line
- Distance: 56.6 km from Miyakonojō
- Platforms: 1 side platform
- Tracks: 1

Construction
- Structure type: At grade
- Parking: Available at forecourt
- Cycle facilities: Bike shed
- Accessible: Yes - level crossing and ramp to platform

Other information
- Status: Unstaffed
- Website: Official website

History
- Opened: 1 October 1912
- Former names: Kyōmachi (until 1 November 1990)

Passengers
- FY2016: 69 daily

Services
Preceding station	JR Kyushu	Following station
Tsurumaru towards Yoshimatsu	Kitto Line	Ebino towards Miyakonojō
Location
- Location within Miyazaki Prefecture Location within Japan

Kyōmachi Onsen Station (京町温泉駅, Kyōmachi Onsen-eki) is a passenger railway station located in the city of Ebino, Miyazaki Prefecture, Japan. It is operated by JR Kyushu and is on the Kitto Line.

== Lines ==
The station is served by the Kitto Line and is located 56.6 km from the starting point of the line at Miyakonojō.

== Layout ==
The station consists of a side platform serving a bi-directional track at grade. The station building is a modern concrete block structure which is now unstaffed and serves only as a waiting room. Access to the island platform is by means of a level crossing with ramps. Parking and a bike shed are available at the forecourt.

== History ==
On 1 October 1912, Japanese Government Railways (JGR) opened a track between Yoshimatsu and Kobayashi (then named Kobayashimachi) during the first phase of construction of what it then designated as the Miyazaki Line. Kyōmachi Onsen (at that time named Kyōmachi Station (京町駅)) was opened on the same day as one of several intermediate stations along the track. On 15 December 1923, the stretch of track between Yoshimatsu and Miyakonojō which included Kyōmachi, was designated as part of the Nippō Main Line. On 6 December 1932, the same stretch was separated out and was designated as the Kitto Line with Miyakonojō as the starting point. The current station building was completed in 1962. Freight operations were discontinued in 1962 and baggage handling in 1984. With the privatization of Japanese National Railways (JNR), the successor of JGR, on 1 April 1987, Kyōmachi came under the control of JR Kyushu. On 1 November 1990, Kyōmachi was renamed Kyōmachi Onsen.

== Passenger statistics ==
In fiscal 2016, the station was used by an average of 69 passengers (boarding only) per day.

== Surrounding area ==
- Kyōmachi Onsen
- Ebino City Masayuki Elementary School
- Ebino City Masayuki Junior High School

== See also ==
- List of railway stations in Japan
