= Ebino Iino Station =

Railway station in Ebino, Miyazaki Prefecture, Japan

Ebino Iino Station えびの飯野駅
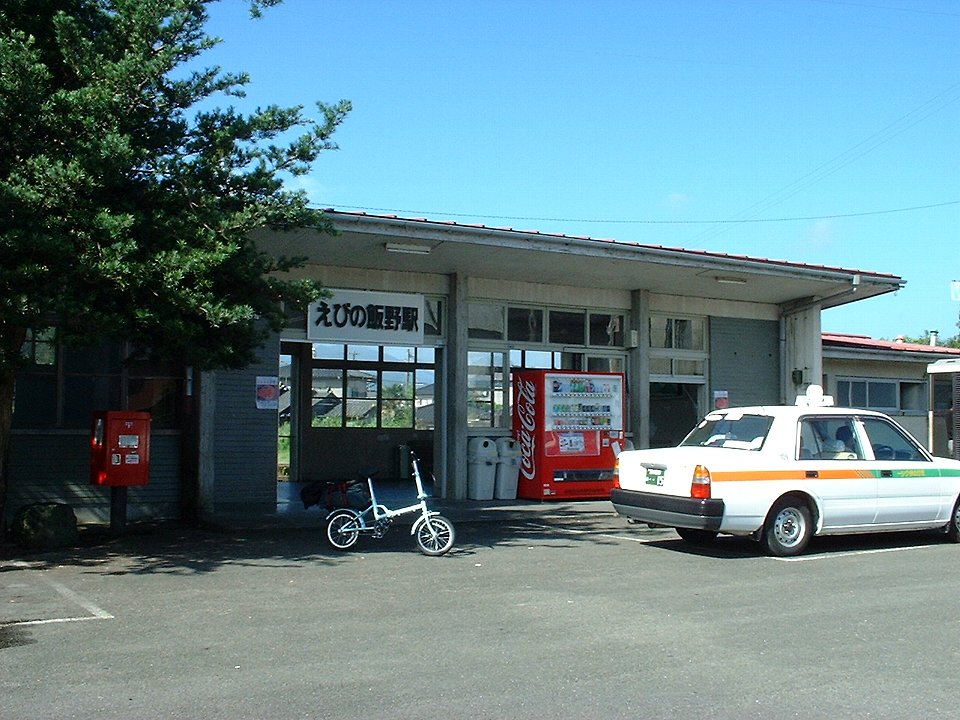
- Ebino Iino Station in 2003

General information
- Location: 2213 Harada, Ebino-shi, Miyazaki-ken 889-4301; Japan
- Coordinates: 32°01′50″N 130°52′15″E
- Operator: JR Kyushu
- Line: ■ Kitto Line
- Distance: 46.6 km from Miyakonojō
- Platforms: 1 island platform
- Tracks: 2 + 1 siding

Construction
- Structure type: At grade
- Parking: Available at forecourt
- Cycle facilities: Bike shed

Other information
- Status: Unstaffed
- Website: Official website

History
- Opened: 1 October 1912
- Former names: Iino (until 1 November 1990)

Passengers
- FY2016: 173 daily

Services
Preceding station	JR Kyushu	Following station
Ebino Uwae towards Yoshimatsu	Kitto Line	Nishi Kobayashi towards Miyakonojō
Location
- Location within Miyazaki Prefecture Location within Japan

Ebino Iino Station (えびの飯野駅, Ebino Iino-eki) is a passenger railway station located in the city of Ebino, Miyazaki Prefecture, Japan. It is operated by JR Kyushu and is on the Kitto Line.

== Lines ==
The station is served by the Kitto Line and is located 46.6 km from the starting point of the line at Miyakonojō.

== Layout ==
The station consists of an island platform serving two tracks at grade with a siding. The station building is a modern concrete block structure which is now unstaffed and serves only as a waiting room. Access to the island platform is by means of a level crossing. Parking and a bike shed are available at the forecourt.

=== Platforms ===
1	■ ■ Kitto Line	for Miyakonojō and Miyazaki
2	■ ■ Kitto Line	for Yoshimatsu and Hayato

== History ==
On 1 October 1912, Japanese Government Railways (JGR) opened a track between Yoshimatsu and Kobayashi (then named Kobayashimachi) during the first phase of construction of what it then designated as the Miyazaki Line. Ebino Iino (at that time named Iino Station (飯野駅)) was opened on the same day as one of several intermediate stations along the track. On 15 December 1923, the stretch of track between Yoshimatsu and Miyakonojō which included Iino, was designated as part of the Nippō Main Line. On 6 December 1932, the same stretch was separated out and was designated as the Kitto Line with Miyakonojō as the starting point. The current station building was completed on 26 August 1960. Freight operations were discontinued in 1980 and baggage handling in 1984. With the privatization of Japanese National Railways (JNR), the successor of JGR, on 1 April 1987, Iino came under the control of JR Kyushu. On 1 November 1990, Iino was renamed Ebino Iino.

== Passenger statistics ==
In fiscal 2016, the station was used by an average of 173 passengers (boarding only) per day.

== Surrounding area ==
- Ebino Daiichi Hospital
- Miyazaki Prefectural Iino High School

== See also ==
- List of railway stations in Japan
