= Tsurumaru Station =

Railway station in Yūsui, Kagoshima Prefecture, Japan

Tsurumaru Station 鶴丸駅
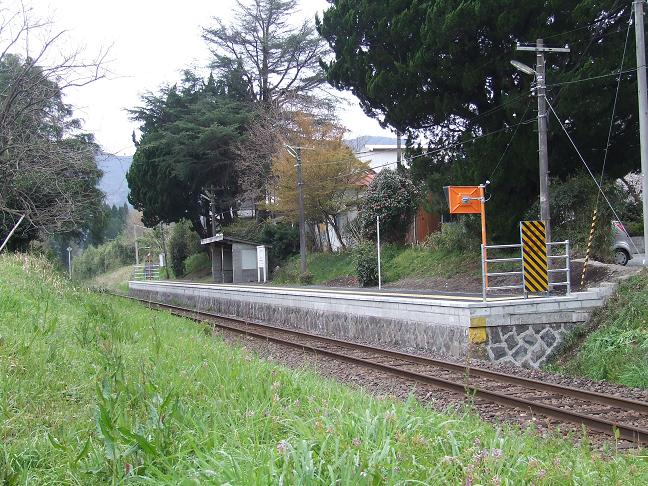
- Platform of Tsurumaru Station in 2009

General information
- Location: Tsurumaru, Yūsui-cho, Aira-gun, Kagoshima-ken 899-6101; Japan
- Coordinates: 32°01′50″N 130°44′54″E
- Operator: JR Kyushu
- Line: ■ Kitto Line
- Distance: 59.0 from km from Miyakonojō
- Platforms: 1 side platform
- Tracks: 1

Construction
- Structure type: At grade
- Cycle facilities: Bike shed
- Accessible: No - steps to platform

Other information
- Status: Unstaffed
- Website: Official website

History
- Opened: 1 February 1958

Passengers
- FY2013: 79 daily

Services
Preceding station	JR Kyushu	Following station
Yoshimatsu Terminus	Kitto Line	Kyōmachi Onsen towards Miyakonojō
Location
- Location within Kagoshima Prefecture Location within Japan

Tsurumaru Station (鶴丸駅, Tsurumaru-eki) is a passenger railway station located in the town of Yūsui, Aira District, Kagoshima Prefecture, Japan. It is operated by JR Kyushu.

== Lines ==
The station is served by the Kitto Line and is located 59.0 km from the starting point of the line at Miyakonojō.

== Layout ==
The station consists of a side platform serving a single track. There is no station building at this unstaffed station, only a shelter on the platform for waiting passengers. The access road is at a higher level than the station platform which is accessed by going down a short flight of steps. A bike shed is provided at the station entrance.

== History ==
Japanese National Railways (JNR) opened the station on 1 February 1958 as an additional station on the existing track of the Kitto Line. With the privatization of JNR on 1 April 1987, the station came under the control of JR Kyushu.

== Passenger statistics ==
In fiscal 2013, the station was used by an average of 13 passengers per day.

== Nearby places ==
- Japan National Route 268
- Tsurumaru Onsen

== See also ==
- List of railway stations in Japan
