= Tanigashira Station =

Railway station in Miyakonojō, Miyazaki Prefecture, Japan

Tanigashira Station 谷頭駅
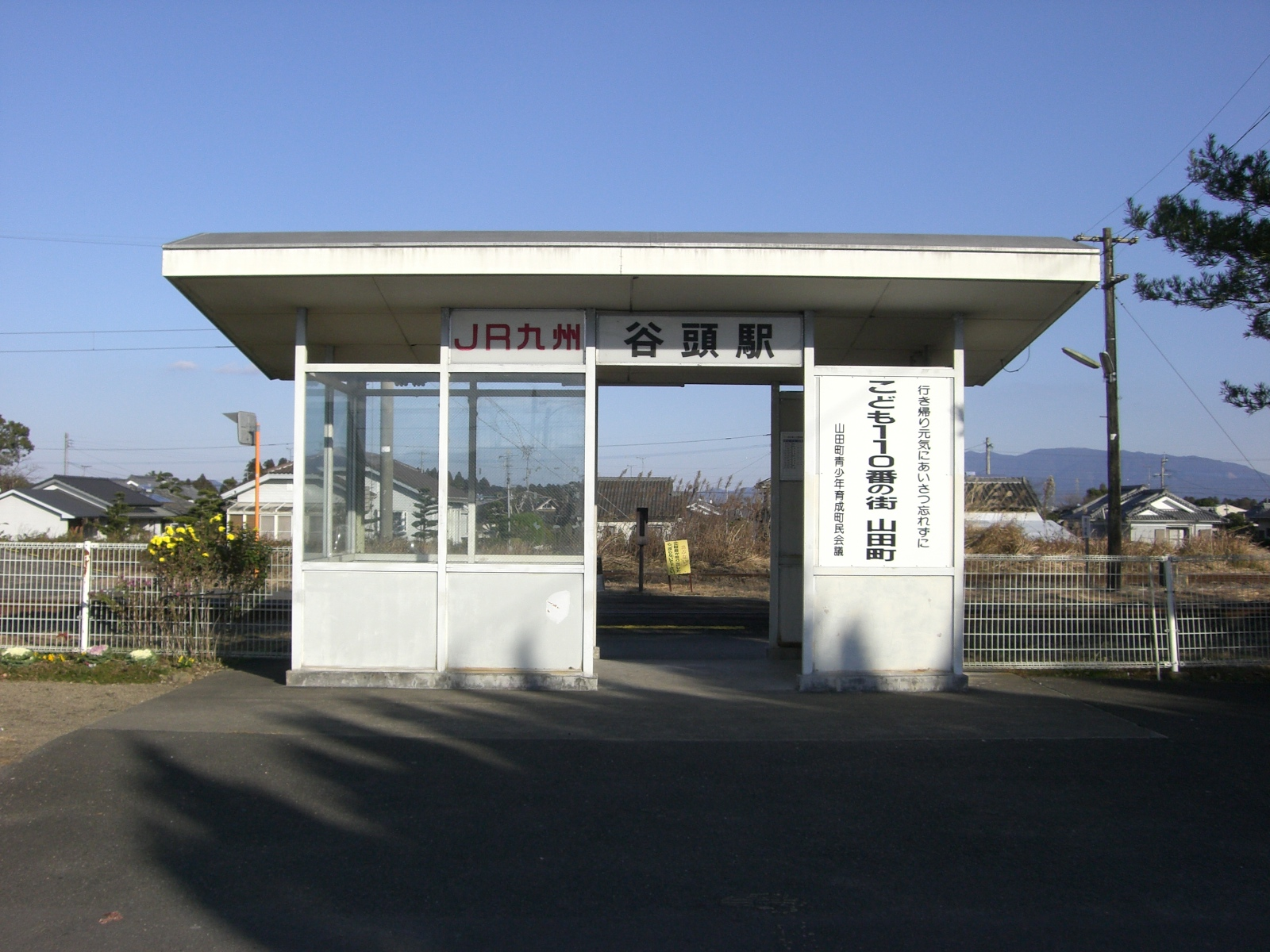
- Tanigashira Station in 2008

General information
- Location: Yamadacho Nakakirishima, Miyakonojō-shi, Miyazaki-ken 889-4602; Japan
- Coordinates: 31°47′19″N 131°03′15″E
- Operator: JR Kyushu
- Line: ■ Kitto Line
- Distance: 7.1 km from Miyakonojō
- Platforms: 1 island platform
- Tracks: 2 + 1 siding

Construction
- Structure type: At grade
- Parking: Available at forecourt
- Cycle facilities: Bike shed
- Accessible: Yes - level crossing and ramp to platform

Other information
- Status: Unstaffed
- Website: Official website

History
- Opened: 11 May 1913

Passengers
- FY2016: 65 daily

Services
Preceding station	JR Kyushu	Following station
Mangatsuka towards Yoshimatsu	Kitto Line	Hyūga Shōnai towards Miyakonojō
Location
- Location within Miyazaki Prefecture Location within Japan

Tanigashira Station (谷頭駅, Tanigashira-eki) is a passenger railway station located in the city of Miyakonojō, Miyazaki Prefecture, Japan. It is operated by JR Kyushu.

== Lines ==
The station is served by the Kitto Line and is located 7.1 km from the starting point of the line at Miyakonojō.

== Layout ==
The station consists of an island platform serving two tracks at grade with a siding. There is no station building but a shed has been set up at the station entrance as a waiting room. A level crossing and ramp leads to the island platform which also has a shelter. Parking and a bike shed are available at the station forecourt.

=== Platforms ===
1	■ ■ Kitto Line	for Yoshimatsu and Hayato
2	■ ■ Kitto Line	for Miyakonojō and Miyazaki

== History ==
Japanese Government Railways (JGR) opened what it then designated as the Miyazaki Line between Yoshimatsu and Kobayashi (then named Kobayashimachi) on 1 October 1912. In the second phase of expansion, the track was extended southeast to Tanigashira which opened as the eastern terminus on 11 May 1913. On 15 December 1923, the stretch of track between Yoshimatsu and Miyakonojō which included Tanigashira, was designated as part of the Nippō Main Line. On 6 December 1932, the same stretch was separated out and was designated as the Kitto Line with Miyakonojō as the starting point. With the privatization of Japanese National Railways (JNR), the successor of JGR, on 1 April 1987, Tanigashira came under the control of JR Kyushu.

== Passenger statistics ==
In fiscal 2016, the station was used by an average of 65 passengers (boarding only) per day.

== Surrounding area ==
- Miyakonojo City Hall/Sega Community Center

== See also ==
- List of railway stations in Japan
