= Higashi Takasaki Station =

Railway station in Miyakonojō, Miyazaki Prefecture, Japan

Higashi Takasaki Station 東高崎駅
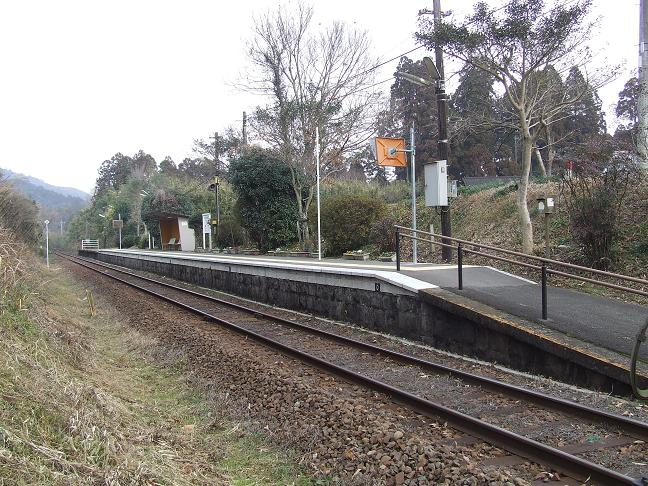
- Higashi Takasaki Station in 2010

General information
- Location: Takazakicho Tsumagirishima, Miyakonojō-shi, Miyazaki-ken 889-4504; Japan
- Coordinates: 31°50′27″N 131°03′55″E
- Operator: JR Kyushu
- Line: ■ Kitto Line
- Distance: 13.5 from km Miyakonojō
- Platforms: 1 side platform
- Tracks: 1

Construction
- Structure type: At grade
- Cycle facilities: Bike shed
- Accessible: Yes - ramp to platform

Other information
- Status: Unstaffed
- Website: Official website

History
- Opened: 1 December 1963

Passengers
- FY2016: 17 daily

Services
Preceding station	JR Kyushu	Following station
Takasaki Shinden towards Yoshimatsu	Kitto Line	Mangatsuka towards Miyakonojō
Location
- Location within Miyazaki Prefecture Location within Japan

Higashi Takasaki Station (東高崎駅, Higashi Takasaki-eki) is a passenger railway station located in the city of Miyakonojō, Miyazaki Prefecture, Japan. It is operated by JR Kyushu .

== Lines ==
The station is served by the Kitto Line and is located 13.5 km from the starting point of the line at Miyakonojō.

== Layout ==
The station consists of a side platform serving a single track at grade. There is no station building, only a shelter on the platform for waiting passengers. The entrance to the platform is at one end of the platform where a road crosses the track at a level crossing. From the entrance, a ramp leads up to the platform. A bike shed is provided nearby.

== History ==
Japanese National Railways (JNR) opened the station on 1 December 1963 as an additional station on the existing track of the Kitto Line. With the privatization of JNR on 1 April 1987, the station came under the control of JR Kyushu.

== Passenger statistics ==
In fiscal 2016, the station was used by an average of 17 passengers (boarding only) per day.

== Surrounding area ==
- Higashi Kirishima Shrine

== See also ==
- List of railway stations in Japan
