= Hyūga Maeda Station =

Railway station in Miyakonojō, Miyazaki Prefecture, Japan

Hyūga Maeda Station 日向前田駅
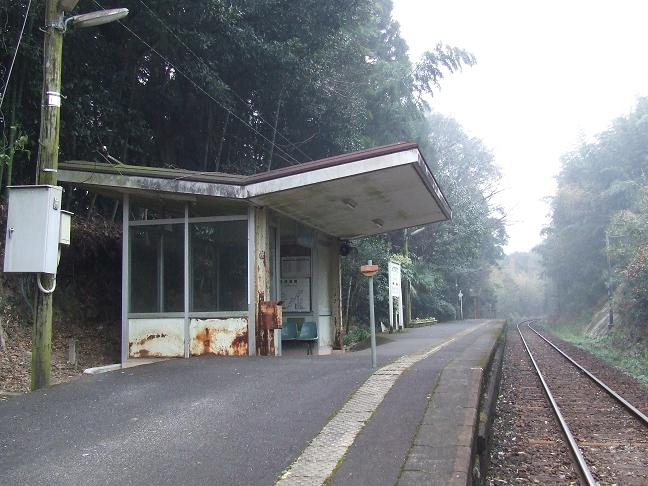
- Hyūga Maeda Station in 2010

General information
- Location: Takazakicho Maeda, Miyakonojō-shi, Miyazaki-ken 889-4506; Japan
- Coordinates: 31°54′31″N 131°02′26″E
- Operator: JR Kyushu
- Line: ■ Kitto Line
- Distance: 22.2 km from Miyakonojō
- Platforms: 1 side platform
- Tracks: 1

Construction
- Structure type: Side hill cutting
- Parking: Not available
- Cycle facilities: Bike shed
- Accessible: No - steep slope from access road

Other information
- Status: Unstaffed
- Website: Official website

History
- Opened: 1 March 1947

Passengers
- FY2016: 11 daily

Services
Preceding station	JR Kyushu	Following station
Takaharu towards Yoshimatsu	Kitto Line	Takasaki Shinden towards Miyakonojō
Location
- Location within Miyazaki Prefecture Location within Japan

Hyūga Maeda Station (日向前田駅, Hyūga Maeda-eki) is a passenger railway station located in the city of Miyakonojō, Miyazaki Prefecture, Japan. It is operated by JR Kyushu.

== Lines ==
The station is served by the Kitto Line and is located 22.2 km from the starting point of the line at Miyakonojō.

== Layout ==
The station consists of a side platform serving a single track on a side hill cutting. There is no station building, only a shelter on the platform for waiting passengers. From the access road, a steep ramp leads up to the platform where a bike shed is also located.

== History ==
Japanese Government Railways (JGR) opened the station on 1 March 1947 as an additional station on the existing track of the Kitto Line. With the privatization of Japanese National Railways (JNR), the successor of JGR, on 1 April 1987, the station came under the control of JR Kyushu.

== Passenger statistics ==
In fiscal 2016, the station was used by an average of 11 passengers (boarding only) per day.

== Surrounding area ==
- Miyakonojo City Takasakiroku Elementary School
- Miyazaki Expressway Hinata Takasaki PA

== See also ==
- List of railway stations in Japan
