= Mangatsuka Station =

Railway station in Miyakonojō, Miyazaki Prefecture, Japan

Mangatsuka Station 万ヶ塚駅
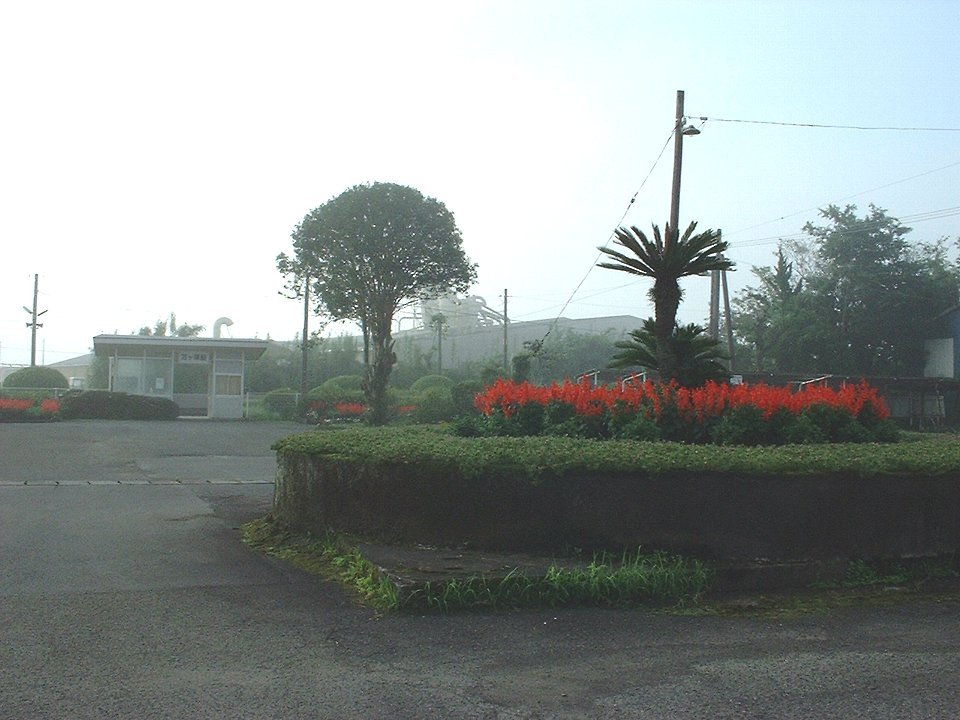
- Mangatsuka Station, August 2003

General information
- Location: Marutanicho, Miyakonojō-shi, Miyazaki-ken 885-1105; Japan
- Coordinates: 31°49′02″N 131°03′50″E
- Operator: JR Kyushu
- Line: ■ Kitto Line
- Distance: 10.6 from km Miyakonojō
- Platforms: 1 side platform
- Tracks: 1

Construction
- Structure type: At grade
- Parking: Available at forecourt
- Cycle facilities: Bike shed
- Accessible: Partial - 2 steps to platform

Other information
- Status: Unstaffed
- Website: Official website

History
- Opened: 1 March 1947

Passengers
- FY2016: 31 daily

Services
Preceding station	JR Kyushu	Following station
Higashi Takasaki towards Yoshimatsu	Kitto Line	Tanigashira towards Miyakonojō
Location
- Location within Miyazaki Prefecture Location within Japan

Mangatsuka Station (万ヶ塚駅, Mangatsuka-eki) is a passenger railway station located in the city of Miyakonojō, Miyazaki Prefecture, Japan. It is operated by JR Kyushu.

== Lines ==
The station is served by the Kitto Line and is located 10.6 km from the starting point of the line at Miyakonojō.

== Layout ==
The station consists of a side platform serving a single track at grade. There is no station building but a shed has been set up at the station entrance as a waiting room. From the shed, there is a short flight of two steps required to access the platform. Parking and a bike shed are available at the station forecourt.

== History ==
Japanese Government Railways (JGR) opened the station on 1 March 1947 as an additional station on the existing track of the Kitto Line. With the privatization of Japanese National Railways (JNR), the successor of JGR, on 1 April 1987, Tanigashira came under the control of JR Kyushu.

== Passenger statistics ==
In fiscal 2016, the station was used by an average of 31 passengers (boarding only) per day.

== Surrounding area ==
- Miyazaki Prefectural Miyazaki Gakuen (child independence support facility)
- Miyazaki Prefectural Route 425 Mangazuka Stop Line

== See also ==
- List of railway stations in Japan
