= Hirowara Station =

Railway station in Takaharu, Miyazaki Prefecture, Japan

Hirowara Station 広原駅
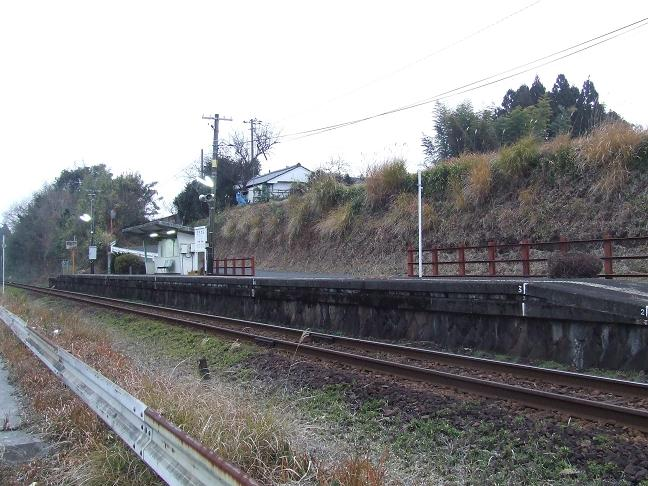
- Hirowara Station in 2010

General information
- Location: 2264 Hirowara, Takaharu-cho, Nishimorokata-gun, Miyazaki-ken 889-4411; Japan
- Coordinates: 31°57′28″N 130°59′05″E
- Operator: JR Kyushu
- Line: ■ Kitto Line
- Distance: 30.8 km from Miyakonojō
- Platforms: 1 side platform
- Tracks: 1

Construction
- Structure type: At grade
- Cycle facilities: Bike shed

Other information
- Status: Unstaffed
- Website: Official website

History
- Opened: 1 October 1961

Passengers
- FY2016: 17 daily

Services
Preceding station	JR Kyushu	Following station
Kobayashi towards Yoshimatsu	Kitto Line	Takaharu towards Miyakonojō
Location
- Location within Miyazaki Prefecture Location within Japan

Hirowara Station (広原駅, Hirowara-eki) is a passenger railway station in the town of Takaharu, Nishimorokata District, Miyazaki Prefecture, Japan. It is operated by JR Kyushu and is on the Kitto Line.

== Lines ==
The station is served by the Kitto Line and is located 30.8 km from the starting point of the line at Miyakonojō.

== Layout ==
The station consists of a side platform serving a single track at grade. There is no station building, only a shelter on the platform for waiting passengers. A bike shed is provided near the station entrance by the side of the access road.

== History ==
Japanese Government Railways (JGR) opened the station on 1 October 1961 as an additional station on the existing track of the Kitto Line. With the privatization of Japanese National Railways (JNR), the successor of JGR, on 1 April 1987, the station came under the control of JR Kyushu.

== Passenger statistics ==
In fiscal 2016, the station was used by an average of 17 passengers (boarding only) per day.

== Surrounding area ==
- Takahara Town Hirohara Elementary School

== See also ==
- List of railway stations in Japan
