= Ebino Uwae Station =

Railway station in Ebino, Miyazaki Prefecture, Japan

Ebino Uwae Station えびの上江駅
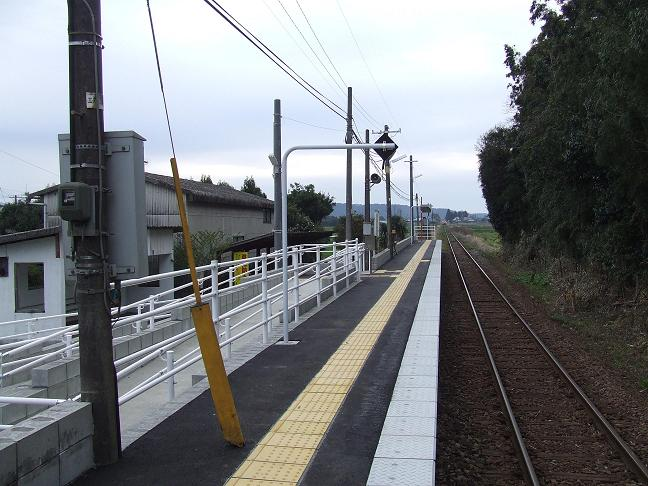
- Ebino Uwae Station in 2009

General information
- Location: 1510 Uwae, Ebino-shi, Miyazaki-ken 889-4304; Japan
- Coordinates: 32°02′08″N 130°51′00″E
- Operator: JR Kyushu
- Line: ■ Kitto Line
- Distance: 48.6 km from Miyakonojō
- Platforms: 1 side platform
- Tracks: 1

Construction
- Structure type: At grade
- Cycle facilities: Bike shed
- Accessible: Yes - ramp to platform

Other information
- Status: Unstaffed
- Website: Official website

History
- Opened: 5 July 1957
- Former names: Uwae (until 1 November 1990)

Passengers
- FY2016: 15 daily

Services
Preceding station	JR Kyushu	Following station
Ebino towards Yoshimatsu	Kitto Line	Ebino Iino towards Miyakonojō
Location
- Location within Miyazaki Prefecture Location within Japan

Ebino Uwae Station (えびの上江駅, Ebino Uwae-eki) is a passenger railway station located in the city of Ebino, Miyazaki Prefecture, Japan. It is operated by JR Kyushu and is on the Kitto Line.

== Lines ==
The station is served by the Kitto Line and is located 48.6 km from the starting point of the line at Miyakonojō.

== Layout ==
The station consists of a side platform serving a single track at grade. There is no station building but a simple shed has been set up at the station entrance to serve as a waiting room. A ramp leads up to the platform from there. A bike shed is provided nearby.

== History ==
The station was opened by Japanese National Railways (JNR) on 5 July 1957 with the name Uwae Station (上江駅) as an additional station on the existing track of the Kitto Line. With the privatization of JNR on 1 April 1987, the station came under the control of JR Kyushu. The station was renamed Ebino Uwae on 1 November 1990.

== Passenger statistics ==
In fiscal 2016, the station was used by an average of 15 passengers (boarding only) per day.

== Surrounding area ==
- Ebino City Kamie Elementary and Junior High School

== See also ==
- List of railway stations in Japan
