= Nishi Kobayashi Station =

Railway station in Kobayashi, Miyazaki Prefecture, Japan

Nishi Kobayashi Station 西小林駅
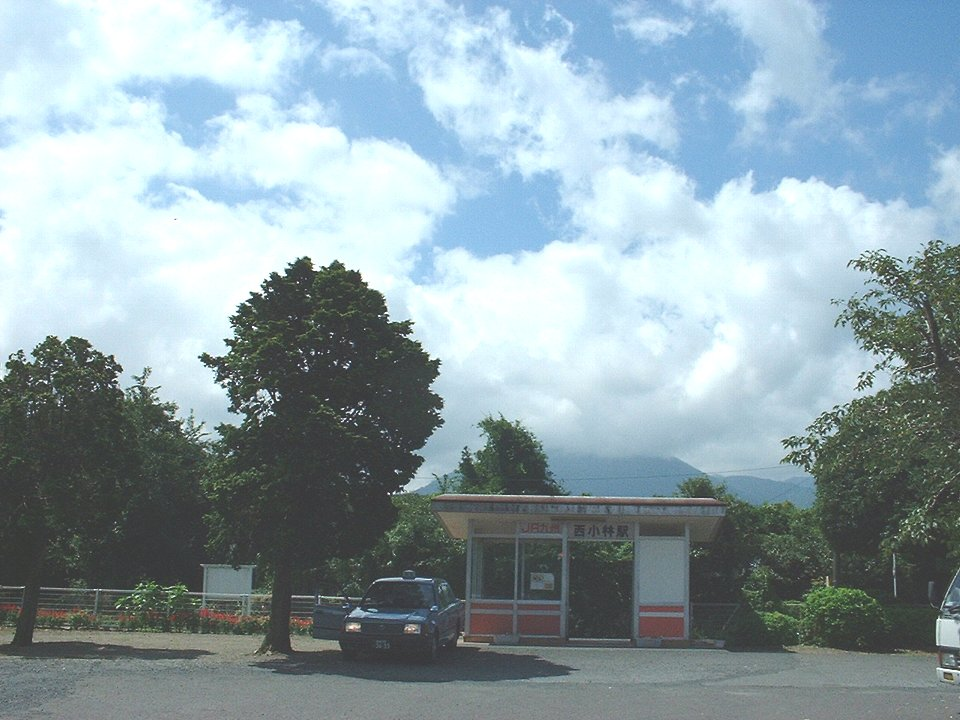
- Nishi Kobayashi Station in 2003

General information
- Location: 1292 Kitanishikata, Kobayashi-shi, Miyazaki-ken 886-0006; Japan
- Coordinates: 32°00′35″N 130°55′18″E
- Operator: JR Kyushu
- Line: ■ Kitto Line
- Distance: 41.0 from km Miyakonojō
- Platforms: 1 side platform
- Tracks: 1

Construction
- Structure type: At grade
- Parking: Available at station forecourt
- Cycle facilities: Bike shed

Other information
- Status: Unstaffed
- Website: Official website

History
- Opened: 1 February 1929

Passengers
- FY2016: 29 daily

Services
Preceding station	JR Kyushu	Following station
Ebino Iino towards Yoshimatsu	Kitto Line	Kobayashi towards Miyakonojō
Location
- Location within Miyazaki Prefecture Location within Japan

Nishi Kobayashi Station (西小林駅, Nishi-Kobayashi-eki) is a passenger railway station located in the city of Kobayashi, Miyazaki Prefecture, Japan. It is operated by JR Kyushu and is on the Kitto Line.

== Lines ==
The station is served by the Kitto Line and is located 41.0 km from the starting point of the line at Miyakonojō.

== Layout ==
The station consists of a side platform serving a single track at grade. There is no station building but a simple shed has been set up at the station entrance to serve as a waiting room. Parking and a bike shed are available at the station forecourt.

== History ==
The station was opened by Japanese Government Railways (JGR) on 1 February 1929 as an additional station on the existing track of what it then designated as part of the Nippō Main Line. On 6 December 1932, the stretch of track between Yoshimatsu and Miyakonojō, which included Nishi Kobayashi, was separated out and redesignated as the Kitto Line with Miyakonojō as the starting point. Freight services were discontinued in 1962 and baggage handling from 1984, with the station becoming unattended from 1985. With the privatization of Japanese National Railways (JNR), the successor of JGR, on 1 April 1987, Nishi Kobayashi came under the control of JR Kyushu.

== Passenger statistics ==
In fiscal 2016, the station was used by an average of 29 passengers (boarding only) per day.

== Surrounding area ==
- Kobayashi City Hall Nishikobayashi Branch

== See also ==
- List of railway stations in Japan
