= Hyūga Shōnai Station =

Railway station in Miyakonojō, Miyazaki Prefecture, Japan

Hyūga Shōnai Station 日向庄内駅
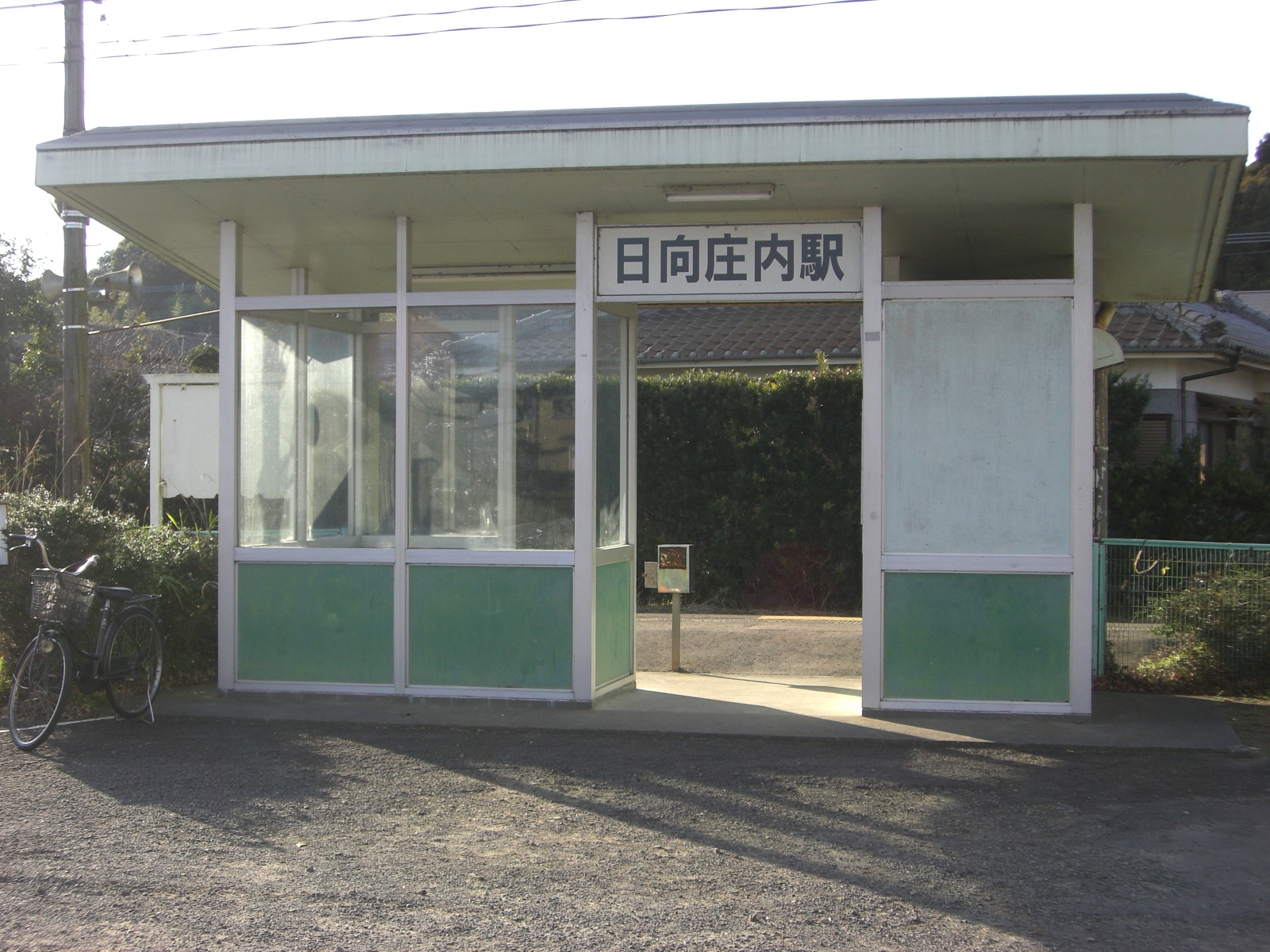
- Hyūga Shōnai Station in 2008

General information
- Location: Otobocho, Miyakonojō-shi, Miyazaki-ken 885-0112; Japan
- Coordinates: 31°45′44″N 131°03′42″E
- Operator: JR Kyushu
- Line: ■ Kitto Line
- Distance: 4.1 from km Miyakonojō
- Platforms: 1 side platform
- Tracks: 1

Construction
- Structure type: At grade
- Cycle facilities: Bike shed
- Accessible: Yes - no steps to platform

Other information
- Status: Unstaffed
- Website: Official website

History
- Opened: 15 April 1952

Passengers
- FY2016: 65 daily

Services
Preceding station	JR Kyushu	Following station
Tanigashira towards Yoshimatsu	Kitto Line	Miyakonojō Terminus
Location
- Location within Miyazaki Prefecture Location within Japan

Hyūga Shōnai Station (日向庄内駅, Hyūga Shōnai-eki) is a passenger railway station located in the city of Miyakonojō, Miyazaki Prefecture, Japan. It is operated by JR Kyushu.

== Lines ==
The station is served by the Kitto Line and is located 4.1 km from the starting point of the line at Miyakonojō.

== Layout ==
The station consists of a side platform, serving a single track at grade. There is no station building but a shed has been set up at the station entrance as a waiting room. A bike shed is available at the station forecourt.

== History ==
Japanese National Railways (JNR) opened Hyūga Shōnai on 15 April 1952 as an additional station on the existing track on the Kitto Line. With the privatization of JNR on 1 April 1987, Tanigashira came under the control of JR Kyushu.

== Passenger statistics ==
In fiscal 2016, the station was used by an average of 65 passengers (boarding only) per day.

== Surrounding area ==
- Miyakonojo National College of Technology
- Ōyodo River

== See also ==
- List of railway stations in Japan
