= Ebino =

City in Miyazaki Prefecture, Japan

Ebino えびの市
- City
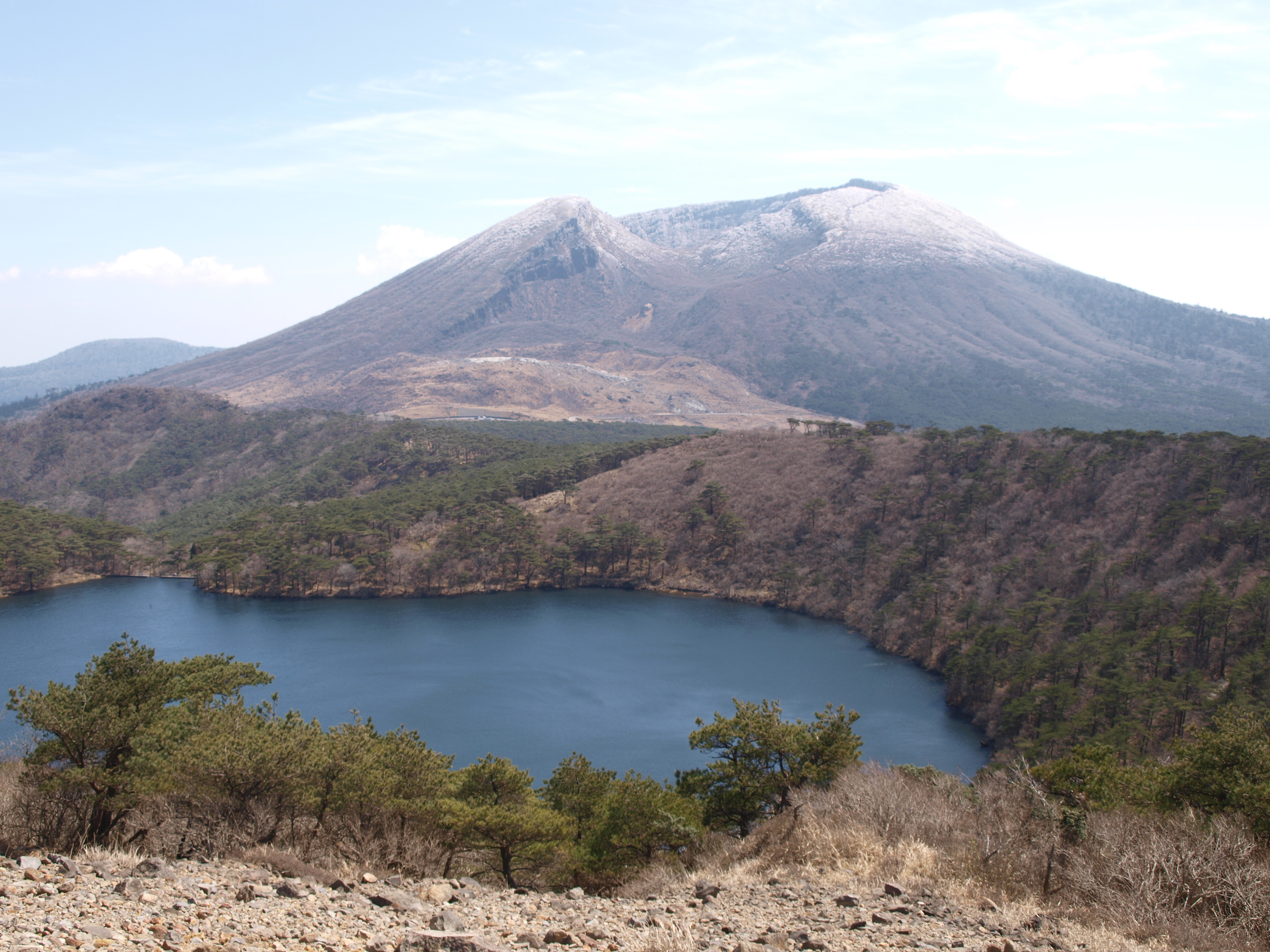
- Mount Karakuni and Byakushi Pond, both volcanoes of Kirisima Volcanoes.

- Flag Chapter

- Location in Japan
- Coordinates: 32°2′43″N 130°48′39″E
- Country: Japan
- Region: Kyushu
- Prefecture: Miyazaki

Government
  - Mayor: Michihiro Miyazaki

Area
  - Total: 282.93 km^{2} (109.24 sq mi)

Population (November 1, 2023)
  - Total: 16,397
  - Density: 57.954/km^{2} (150.10/sq mi)
- Time zone: UTC+09:00 (JST)
- City hall address: 1292 Ōaza Kurishita, Ebino-shi, Miyazaki-ken 889-4292
- Climate: Cfa
- Website: Official website
- Symbols
- Flower: Calanthe discolor (海老根 Ebine)
- Tree: Kirishima Red Pine

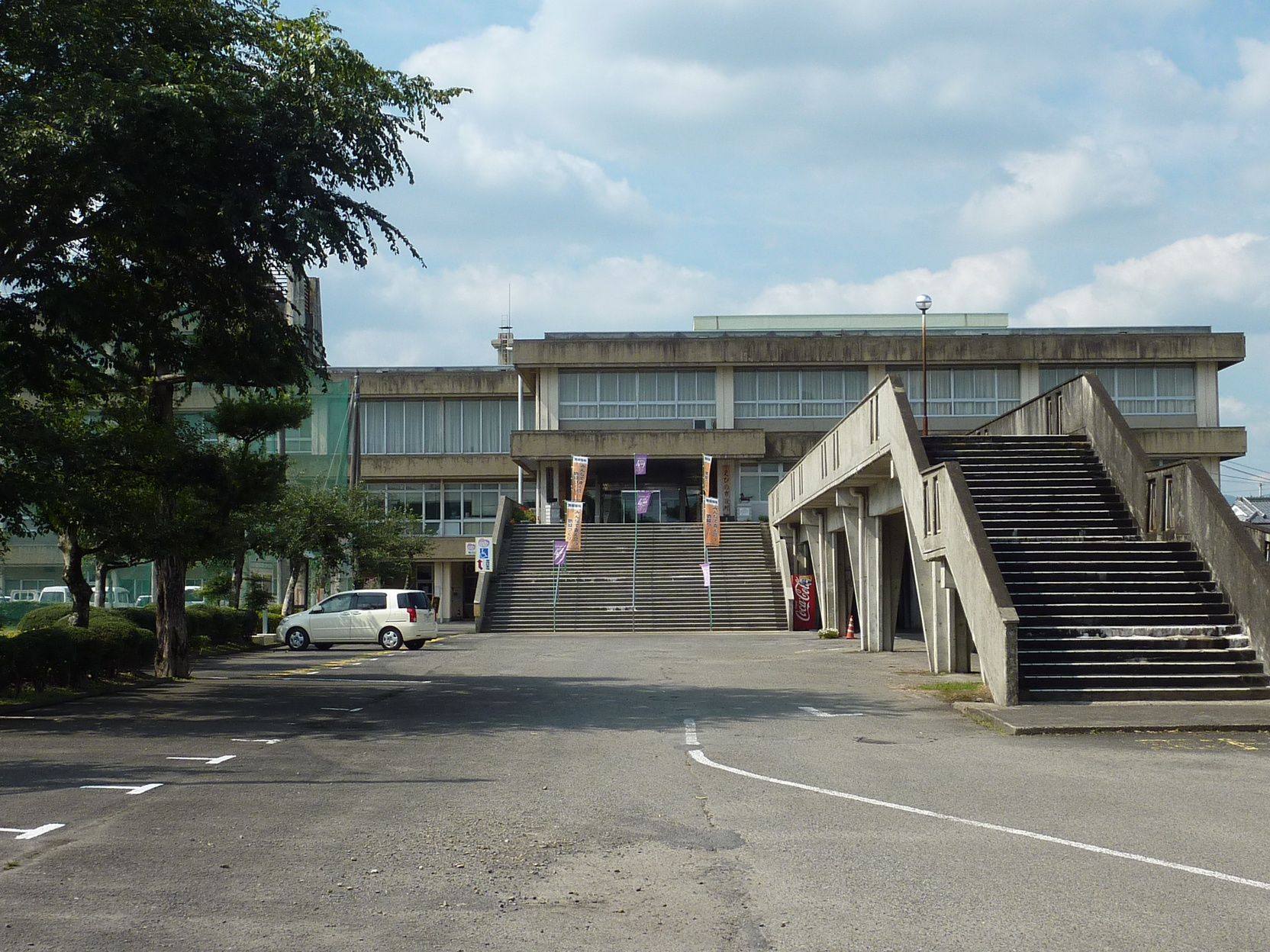
Ebino City Hall

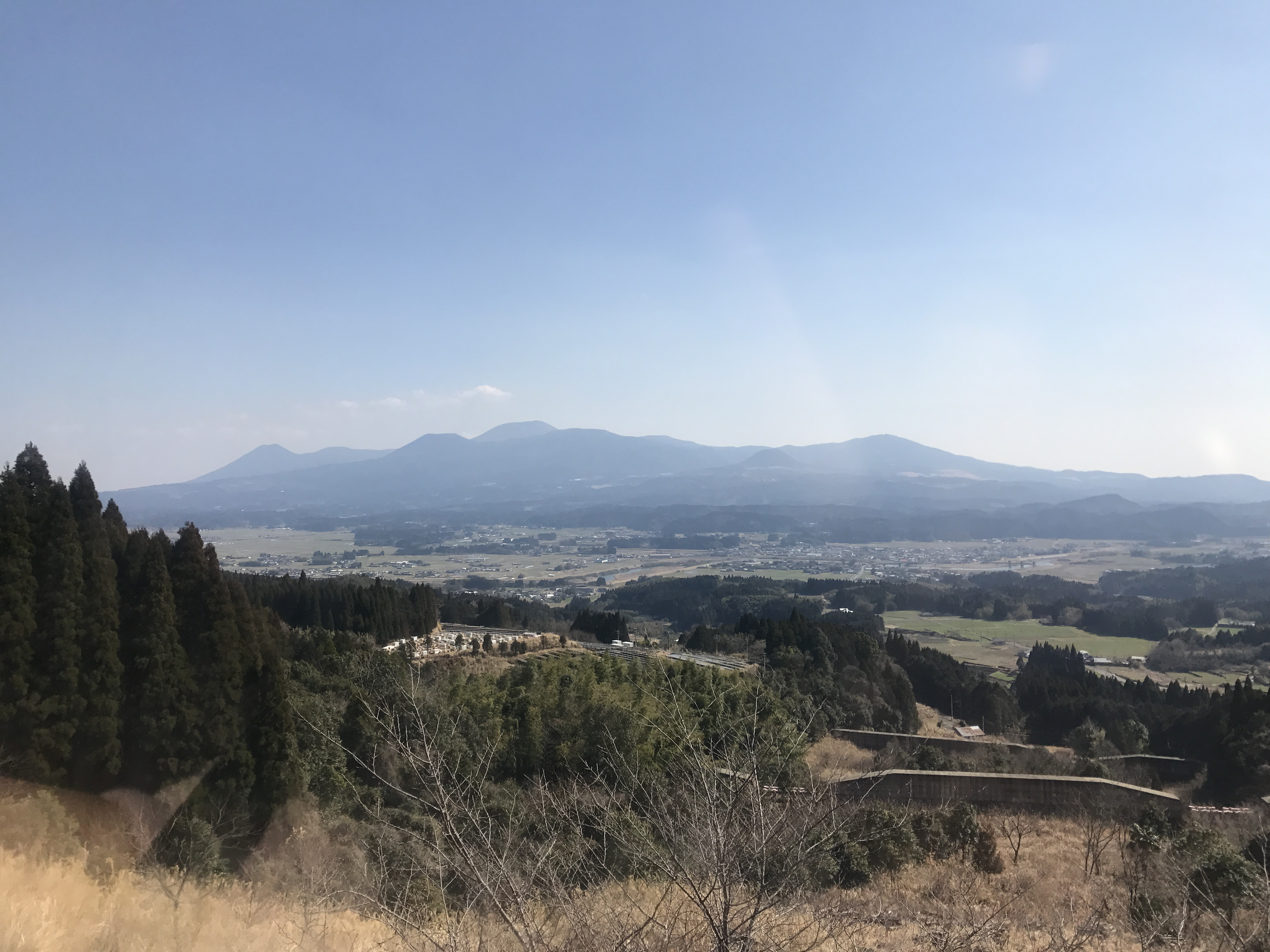
View of Ebino. Massif of Kirishima Volcanoes in the background.

Ebino (えびの市, Ebino-shi; Japanese pronunciation: [è̞.bʲí.nó̞(.ɕì)]) is a city located in Miyazaki Prefecture, Japan. As of 1 November 2023, the city had an estimated population of 16,397 in 7775 households, and a population density of 58 persons per km^{2}. The total area of the city is 282.93 km^{2} (109.24 sq mi).

== Geography ==
Ebino is in far southwestern Miyazaki Prefecture, bordered to the north by Kumamoto Prefecture and to the south by Kagoshima Prefecture. The southern part of the city is formed by the volcanoes and volcanic plateaus of Mount Kirishima and the Ebino Plateau, and is designated as Kirishima-Yaku National Park. The northern part consists of plateaus and mountain forests, forming the Yatake Plateau. The center of the city is the Kakuto Basin, with many hot springs. It is the 8th physically largest city in Miyazaki Prefecture.

- Inhabitable land: 8,256 Hectares (1 October 2004)
- Forestland: 20,044 Hectares (1 February 2005)

=== Neighboring municipalities ===
Kagoshima Prefecture

- Isa
- Kirishima
- Yūsui

Kumamoto Prefecture

- Hitoyoshi
- Nishiki
- Asagiri

Miyazaki Prefecture

- Kobayashi

=== Climate ===
Ebino has a humid subtropical climate (Köppen climate classification Cfa) with hot, humid summers and cool winters. The average annual temperature in Ebino is 15.8 °C (60.4 °F). The average annual rainfall is 2,832.7 mm (111.52 in) with June as the wettest month. The temperatures are highest on average in August, at around 26.2 °C (79.2 °F), and lowest in January, at around 5.1 °C (41.2 °F). The highest temperature ever recorded in Ebino was 39.4 °C (102.9 °F) on 17 August 2020; the coldest temperature ever recorded was −12.0 °C (10.4 °F) on 25 January 2016.

Climate data for Ebino (1991−2020 normals, extremes 1977−present)
| Month | Jan | Feb | Mar | Apr | May | Jun | Jul | Aug | Sep | Oct | Nov | Dec | Year |
|---|---|---|---|---|---|---|---|---|---|---|---|---|---|
| Record high °C (°F) | 22.3 (72.1) | 22.5 (72.5) | 26.6 (79.9) | 30.0 (86.0) | 34.2 (93.6) | 34.6 (94.3) | 38.1 (100.6) | 39.4 (102.9) | 35.6 (96.1) | 33.7 (92.7) | 27.9 (82.2) | 22.8 (73.0) | 39.4 (102.9) |
| Mean daily maximum °C (°F) | 10.8 (51.4) | 12.5 (54.5) | 16.0 (60.8) | 21.0 (69.8) | 25.3 (77.5) | 27.0 (80.6) | 31.0 (87.8) | 32.0 (89.6) | 29.3 (84.7) | 24.6 (76.3) | 18.7 (65.7) | 13.0 (55.4) | 21.8 (71.2) |
| Daily mean °C (°F) | 5.1 (41.2) | 6.4 (43.5) | 9.8 (49.6) | 14.4 (57.9) | 18.9 (66.0) | 22.2 (72.0) | 25.8 (78.4) | 26.2 (79.2) | 23.4 (74.1) | 18.1 (64.6) | 12.2 (54.0) | 6.9 (44.4) | 15.8 (60.4) |
| Mean daily minimum °C (°F) | −0.1 (31.8) | 0.8 (33.4) | 4.0 (39.2) | 8.3 (46.9) | 13.2 (55.8) | 18.3 (64.9) | 22.1 (71.8) | 22.2 (72.0) | 18.9 (66.0) | 12.6 (54.7) | 6.6 (43.9) | 1.5 (34.7) | 10.7 (51.3) |
| Record low °C (°F) | −12.0 (10.4) | −8.5 (16.7) | −6.3 (20.7) | −3.0 (26.6) | 2.6 (36.7) | 7.9 (46.2) | 14.2 (57.6) | 15.1 (59.2) | 7.3 (45.1) | −1.2 (29.8) | −4.1 (24.6) | −7.7 (18.1) | −12.0 (10.4) |
| Average precipitation mm (inches) | 74.7 (2.94) | 117.4 (4.62) | 167.9 (6.61) | 190.7 (7.51) | 228.5 (9.00) | 647.4 (25.49) | 537.2 (21.15) | 287.0 (11.30) | 287.1 (11.30) | 109.4 (4.31) | 100.6 (3.96) | 84.8 (3.34) | 2,832.7 (111.52) |
| Average precipitation days (≥ 1.0 mm) | 8.0 | 8.9 | 12.2 | 11.1 | 10.2 | 16.9 | 14.9 | 13.7 | 11.5 | 7.3 | 8.6 | 7.4 | 130.7 |
| Mean monthly sunshine hours | 139.3 | 144.2 | 170.2 | 182.3 | 183.5 | 114.5 | 171.7 | 190.5 | 158.6 | 180.2 | 151.5 | 141.7 | 1,928.1 |
Source: Japan Meteorological Agency

=== Demographics ===
Per Japanese census data, the population of Ebino in 2020 is 17,638 people. Ebino has been conducting censuses since 1920.

Historical population

| Year | Pop. | ±% |
|---|---|---|
| 1920 | 25,440 | — |
| 1925 | 25,815 | +1.5% |
| 1930 | 27,730 | +7.4% |
| 1935 | 28,582 | +3.1% |
| 1940 | 29,252 | +2.3% |
| 1945 | 39,425 | +34.8% |
| 1950 | 41,001 | +4.0% |
| 1955 | 40,020 | −2.4% |
| 1960 | 37,508 | −6.3% |
| 1965 | 33,101 | −11.7% |
| 1970 | 28,972 | −12.5% |

| Year | Pop. | ±% |
|---|---|---|
| 1975 | 27,241 | −6.0% |
| 1980 | 27,246 | +0.0% |
| 1985 | 28,034 | +2.9% |
| 1990 | 26,826 | −4.3% |
| 1995 | 25,872 | −3.6% |
| 2000 | 24,906 | −3.7% |
| 2005 | 23,079 | −7.3% |
| 2010 | 21,616 | −6.3% |
| 2015 | 19,538 | −9.6% |
| 2020 | 17,638 | −9.7% |

Ebino population statistics

== History ==
The area of Ebino was part of ancient Hyūga Province, and during the Edo period was completely within the borders of Satsuma Domain. In 1871, with the abolition of the han system, the area was incorporated into Kagoshima Prefecture, but was later transferred to Miyazaki Prefecture. The villages of Iino, Kakuto and Masayuki within Nishimorokata District, Miyazaki were established on May 1, 1889 with the creation of the modern municipalities system. Iino was raised to town status on April 3, 1940, followed by Masayuki on April 1, 1950 and Kakuto on February 11, 1955. The three towns merged to form the town of Ebino on November 3, 1966. The Ebino earthquake occurred on February 21, 1968, killing three inhabitants and injuring 42. Ebino was raised to city status on December 1, 1970.

== Government ==
Ebino has a mayor-council form of government with a directly elected mayor and a unicameral city council of 15 members. Ebino contributes one member to the Miyazaki Prefectural Assembly. In terms of national politics, the city is part of the Miyazaki 1st district of the lower house of the Diet of Japan.

== Economy ==
The local economy is overwhelmingly agricultural. Ebino produces a wide range of food products, from shōchū to sweets, tea, honey, mushrooms, chicken and pork. Locally produced crafts include Ebino-yaki pottery and bamboo craftwork, among others.

== Education ==
Ebino has four public elementary schools and three public junior high schools and one combined elementary/junior high school operated by the city, and one public high school operated by the Miyazaki Prefectural Board of Education. There is also one private high school. The Ebino-Kōgen International College closed on April 1, 2009.

== Transportation ==
=== Railways ===
JR Kyushu - Kitto Line

- Kyōmachi Onsen - Ebino - Ebino Uwae - Ebino Iino

JR Kyushu - Hisatsu Line

- Masaki

=== Highways ===
- Kyūshū Expressway
- Miyazaki Expressway
- National Route 221
- National Route 268
- National Route 447

== Sister cities ==
- Belton, Texas, United States, sister city since April 21, 1994

== Local attractions ==
=== Major festivals and events ===
| Date | Event | Location | Description |
|---|---|---|---|
| Jan 1st | First Sunrise of the Year (初日の出 Hatsuhi No De) | Yatake Highlands Belton, Texas Auto Campground (矢岳高原ベルトンオートキャンプ場 Yatake Kōgen Beruton Ōtokyanpu Jō) | A high-altitude view of the first sunrise of the year is possible from the Yatake Highlands Belton Auto Campground. |
| Jan 7th | Takehashi Rakashi (竹はしらかし) | Various locations throughout the city | The sound of green bamboo burning drives away misfortune and participants pray for one year of health and longevity. |
| January 17 | Mokkanjin (餅勧進) | Various locations throughout the city | Mokkanjin is a tradition to drive misfortune away from people who have turned an unlucky age (厄年 yakudoshi) (usually 42 for men and 33 for women). We pray for good health and a safe, peaceful home. The individual who has turned an unlucky age forms a group of five or six people. They put on makeup and costumes and then tour the neighborhood, barging in on friends and relatives with loud music and dancing. While the tradition is for these friends and relatives to then offer gifts of mochi 餅) to the group, money or shōchū (焼酎) have become more common recently. |
| First Saturday in February | Kyomachi Two-Day Market (京町二日市 Kyōmachi Futsukaichi) | The streets in front of Kyomachi Onsen Station (京町温泉駅 Kyōmachi Onsen Eki) | This historic event is the largest market in southern Kyūshū. Approximately 450 shops offering items such as plants, antiques, and specialty products line the streets in front of Kyomachi station. Around 25,000 people come annually for this approximately two kilometers of shopping. |
| First Saturday in March | Ino Garden Market (飯野植木市 Īno Ueki Ichi) | Ino Shopping District (飯野町区商店街 Īno Chō Ku Shōtengai) | This event is a well-known reminder of spring. Approximately 100 local shops and booths, including 30 gardening tool shops line the streets. |
| Beginning of March | Uchiue Festival (打植祭 Uchiue Matsuri) | Katori Shrine (香取神社 Katori Jinjya), Amenomiya Shrine (天宮神社 Amenomiya Jinja) | This is an approximately 400-year-old harvest festival. According to legend, the Deity of Women and the Deity of Men meet for a secret date once a year at this time. The festival centers around the performance of a play called Uchiue (打植). In April 2001, this festival was designated by Miyazaki Prefecture as a spiritual and cultural treasure. |
| March 24 - April 8 | Cherry Tree Lighting | Yahataoka Park (八幡丘公園 Yahataoka Kōen) | Paper lanterns, 2,000 cherry trees, and 200 Camellia japonica (Tsubaki) 椿) flowers are illuminated for evening viewing. |
| April 15 | Kibatto Forest Bamboo Shoot Harvest (きばっど村竹の子狩り Kibatto Mura Take No Ko Gari) | Ue Okobira District (上大河平地区 Ue Okobira Chiku) | This event was revived by the Ue Okobira District community revitalization volunteer group, Kibatto Mura (きばっと村 Kibatto Mura). |
| April 8 | Mount Karakuni (韓国岳 Karakuni Dake) Climbing Season Opener | Ebino Highlands Mount Karakuni Climb Start Point (えびの高原韓国岳登山口 Ebino Kōgen Karakuni Dake Tozan Guchi) | Prayers are spoken for a safe mountain climbing season. |
| April 22 | Kyomachi Onsen Fun Run (京町温泉マラソン大会 Kyōmachi Onsen Marason Taikai) | Kyomachi Onsen Village (京町温泉郷 Kyōmachi Onsen Kyō) | |
| May 4 | Kizakipara Battle Memorial (木崎原古戦場供養祭 Kizakipara Kosenjō Kuyō Matsuri) | Ikejima District (池島地区 Ikejima Chiku) | This festival is a memorial for the soldiers of the Shimadu (島津) and Satsuma (伊藤) clans who died at Kizakipara. Kizakipara is considered by some to have been the unifying battle of Kyūshū. |
| May 8 | Battokannon Festival (馬頭観音祭 Battōkannon Matsuri) | Yahataoka Park (八幡丘公園 Yahataoka Kōen) (and other locations) | In this festival, residents express gratitude to their livestock and pray for their health. The origin of this festival, Battokannon, is located in Rokkannon Oike (六観音御池). |
| Mid-July | Kyomachi Onsen Summer Festival (京町温泉夏祭り Kyōmachi Onsen Natsu Matsuri) | Kawauchi River Kyomachi Riverbed (川内川京町河川敷 Kawauchi Gawa Kyōmachi Kasenshiki) | Fireworks Festival |
| July 28 | Cow Jumping Festival (牛越祭 Ushigoe Matsuri) | Nishigawakita District (西川北区 Nishigawakita Ku) Sugawara Shrine (菅原神社 Sugahwara Jinja) Grounds | Gratitude is expressed for the health of livestock in this rare celebration. With over 300 years of tradition, this festival has become a cherished spiritual and cultural symbol of Miyazaki Prefecture. During this festival, cows are encouraged to leap over a log raised above the ground. Participants pray that the gods will notice this display of energy and health and protect their livestock. |
| Beginning of August | Taiko (太鼓 Taiko) Festival | Ebino International Center (えびの市国際交流センター Ebino Shi Kokusai Kōryū Sentā) | Taiko drumming teams from Ebino and beyond come together to compete. |
| August 26 | Odaiko Odori (大太鼓踊り Ōdaiko Odori) | Nishi Nagaeura District (西長江浦地区 Nishi Nagaeura Chiku) Suwa Jinja (諏訪神社 Suwajinja) | Also known as the Ubaccho (ウバッチョ Ubaccho) or 大ばち dance. This festival is about 420 years old. Performers carry and play taiko drums 120 cm across while dancing. |
| September 23 | Shiratori Sight-Seeing Festival (白鳥観光祭 Shiratori Kankō Matsuri) | Shiratori Shrine Grounds (白鳥神社境内 Shiratori Jinja Keidai) | Approximately 400 elementary and junior high school students from through the Nishimorokata Region (西諸県郡 Nishimoro Katagun). gather for a kendo tournament. |
| September 23 | Kanamatsu Hōnen Festival (金松法然祭 Kanamatsu Hōnen Sai) | Kurishita District (栗下地区 Kurishita Chiku) Plaza | |
| September 30 | International Festival (国際交流フェスティバル Kokusai Kōryū Fuesuteibaru) | International Center Outdoor Stage (国際交流センター野外ステージ Kokusai Kōryū Sentā Yagai Sutēji) | A tug-of-war competition as well as a variety of shops are the main attractions in this event |
| End of October | Ebino Autumn Festival (えびの秋季観光際 Ebino Shuki Kankō Sai) | Green Park Ebino | Blooming cosmos, paragliding, canoeing, local shops, fishing, and musical performances are part of this festival. |
| Beginning of December | Ice Skating Opener | Ebino Highlands Ice Skating Rink (えびの高原アイススケート場 Ebino Kōgen Aisusukēto Jō) | Season opening of Japan's southernmost outdoor ice rink. |
| Mid-December | Illumination | Ino Intersection (飯野交差点 Īno Kōsaten) | |

== Facilities ==
- Ebino Cultural Center
- Ebino International Center
- Ebino VLF transmitter, a large facility for broadcasting messages to submerged submarines.
