= Masaki Station (Miyazaki) =

Railway station in Ebino, Miyazaki Prefecture, Japan

Masaki Station 真幸駅
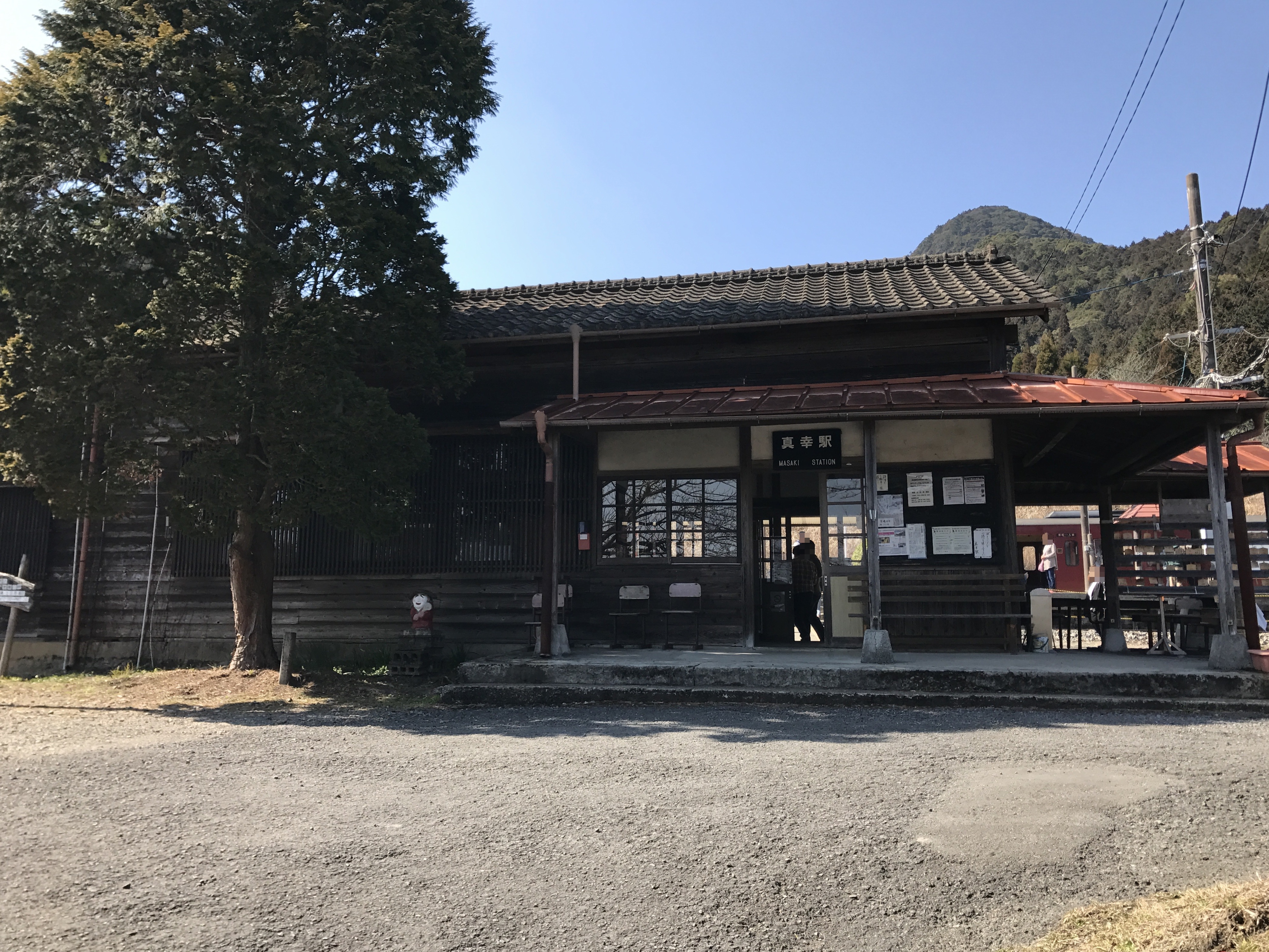
- Masaki Station in March 2017

General information
- Location: 947 Uchitate, Ebinoshi, Miyazaki-ken 889-4162; Japan
- Coordinates: 32°04′28″N 130°43′45″E
- Operator: JR Kyushu
- Line: ■ Hisatsu Line
- Platforms: 1 island platform

Other information
- Website: Official website

History
- Opened: 1911

Passengers
- FY2016: 2 daily

Services
Preceding station	JR Kyushu	Following station
Yatake towards Yatsushiro	Hisatsu Line	Yoshimatsu towards Hayato
Location
- Location within Miyazaki Prefecture Location within Japan

Masaki Station (真幸駅, Masaki-eki) is a passenger railway station located in the city of Ebino, Miyazaki Prefecture, Japan. It is operated by Kyushu Railway Company (JR Kyushu). It is the only station on the Hisatsu Line in Miyazaki Prefecture, and the first station built in the prefecture.

== Lines ==
The station is served by the Hisatsu Line and is located 79.0 km from the starting point of the line at Yatsushiro.

== Layout ==
The station consists of an island platform with two tracks at grade. It is located on a steep section of the Hisatsu Line on an inverted Z-shaped switchback that made it necessary for all trains (including express trains) to stop at this station as passing was impossible. The station building is the same as when first opened. Parking and a bike shed are available at the station forecourt. A "Bell of Happiness" is placed in the middle of the platform. Local volunteers set up station notes and offer special products and tea. Commemorative admission tickets can also be purchased during volunteer hours.

== History ==
The station was opened by Japanese Government Railways (JGR) on 11 May 1911 as an additional station on the existing track of what it then designated as the Hitoyoshi Main Line. On 17 October 1927, the stretch of track between Yoshimatsu and Hayato, which included Masaki, was separated out and redesignated as the Hisatsu Line with the opening of the Sendai Main Line. On 22 August 1945 a derailment accident occurred in a tunnel between Masaki and Yoshimatsu, resulting in 53 deaths, Freight services were discontinued in 1974 and baggage handling from 1984, with the station becoming unattended from 1986. With the privatization of Japanese National Railways (JNR), the successor of JGR, on 1 April 1987, Nishi Kobayashi came under the control of JR Kyushu.

=== Platforms ===
1	■ ■ Hisatsu Line	for Hitoyoshi and Kumamoto
2	■ ■Hisatsu Line	for Yoshimatsu and Miyazaki

== Gallery ==
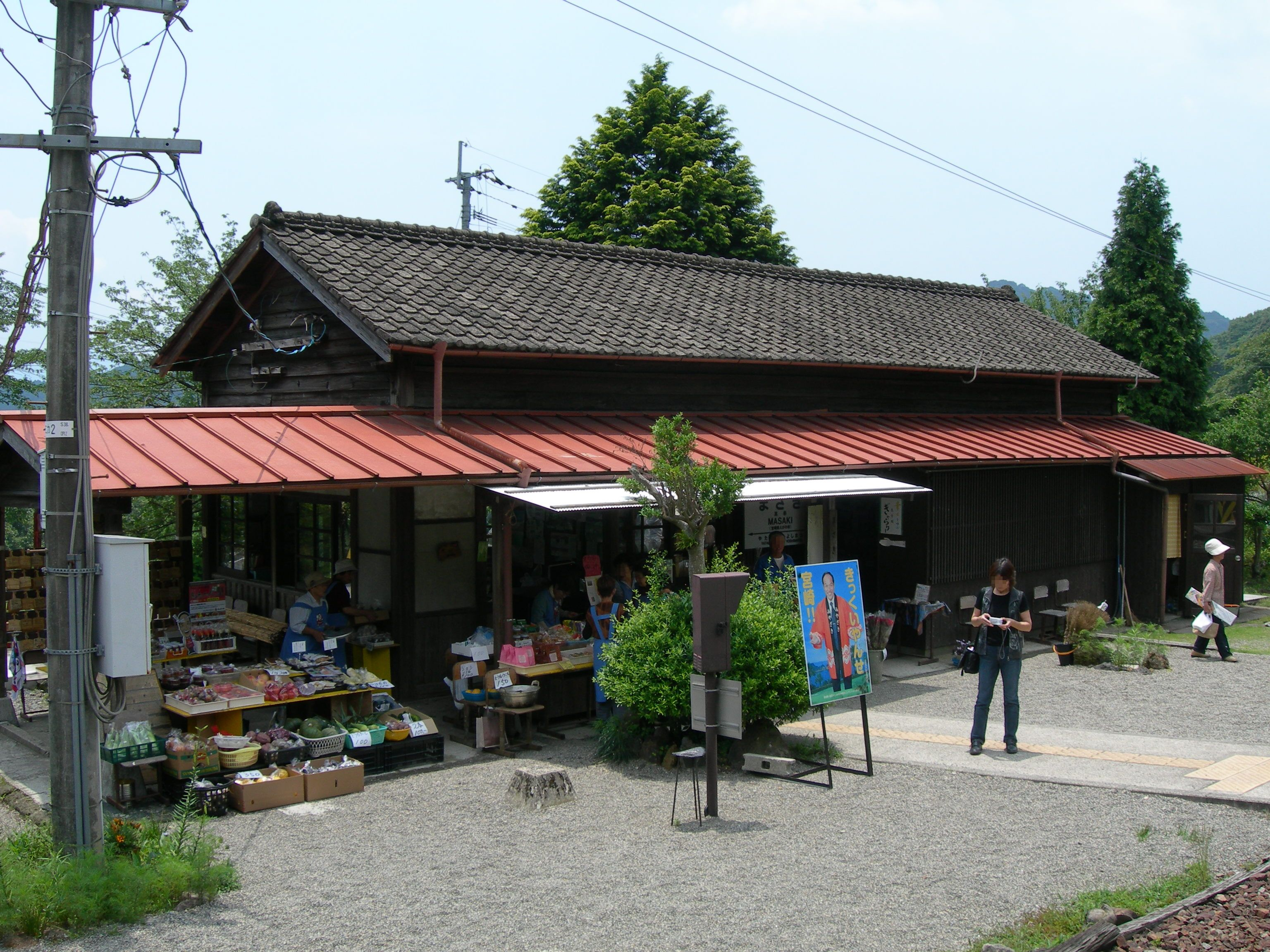
Flea market inside the station

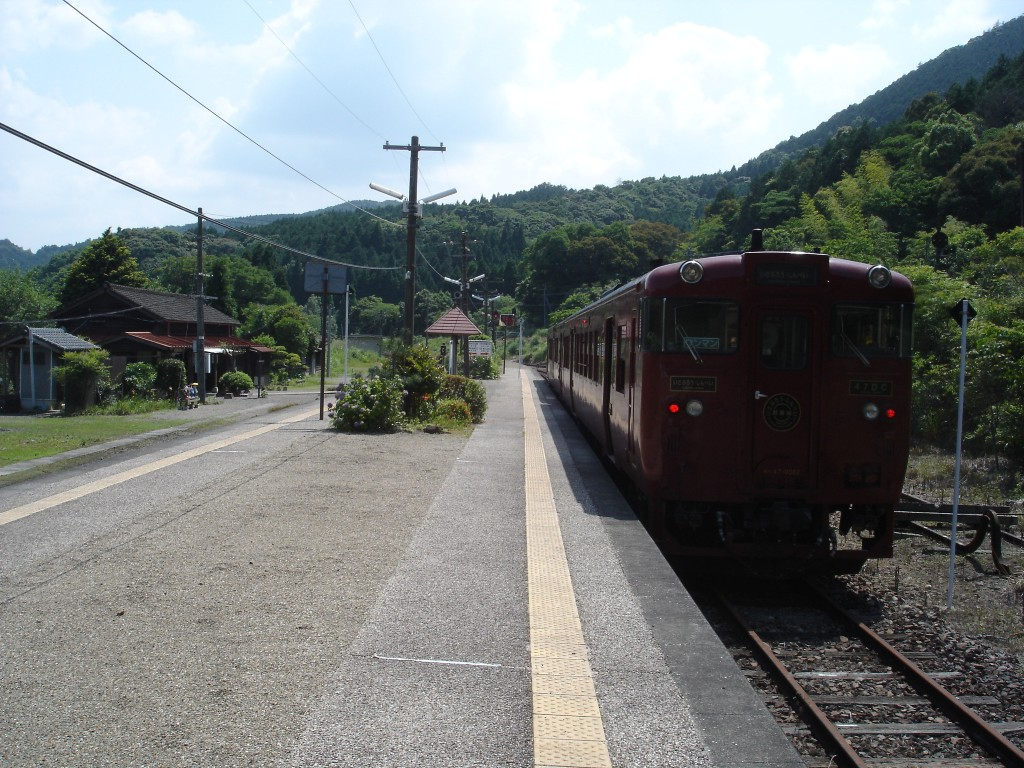
Platform

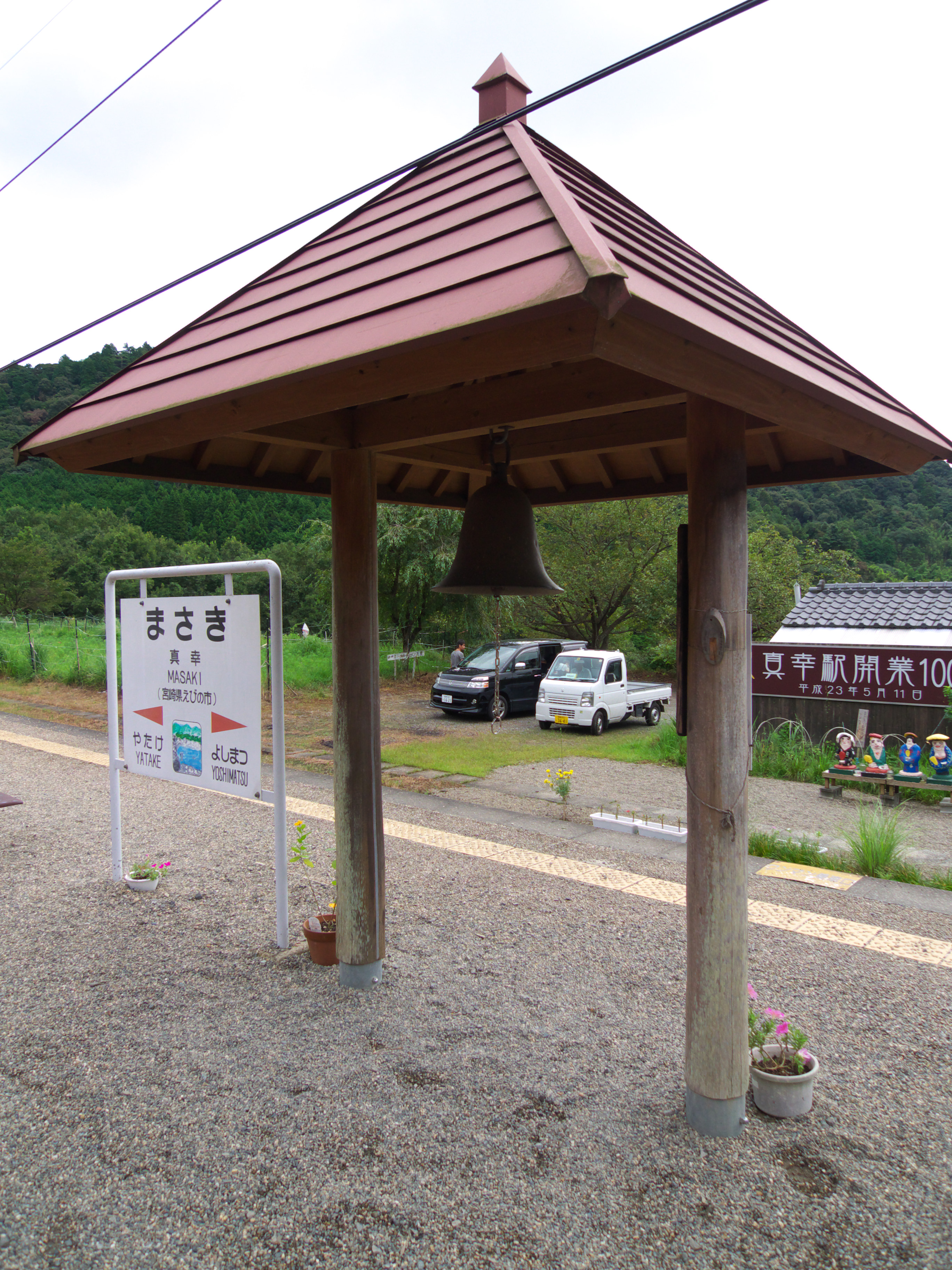
Kofuku no kane (Bell of Happiness) at the platform

== Surrounding area ==
On July 6, 1972, due to the effects of torrential rain, the mountain slope behind the station collapsed, with the debris flow destroying the inside of Masayuki Station and the surrounding area. The floodwaters engulfed the village, leaving 4 people dead, 5 injured, and 28 residential and 29 non-residential houses washed away. Although the tracks and station were restored, all the households whose homes were damaged were relocated, leaving the area around the station almost uninhabited.

== Passenger statistics ==
In fiscal 2016, the station was used by an average of 2 passengers (boarding only) per day.

== See also ==
- List of railway stations in Japan
