= Kitto Line =

Railway line in Kyushu, Japan

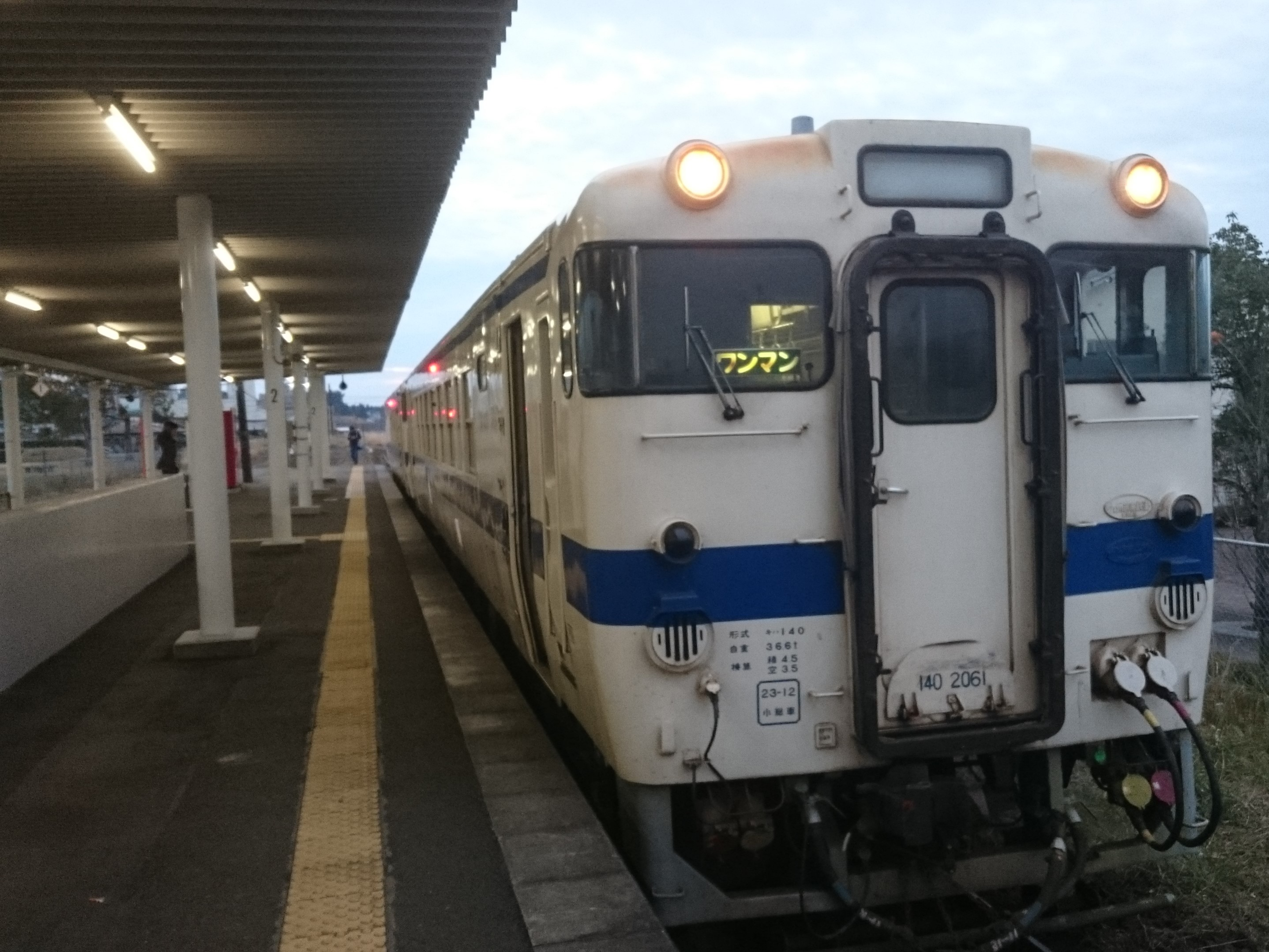
- KiHa 40 series DMU at Kobayashi Station

Overview
- Other name: Ebino Kōgen Line
- Native name: 吉都線
- Owner: JR Kyushu
- Locale: Kagoshima; Miyazaki
- Termini: Yoshimatsu; Miyakonojō
- Stations: 17

Service
- Operator: JR Kyushu
- Rolling stock: KiHa 40 series DMU
- Daily ridership: 576

History
- Opened: 1 October 1912

Technical
- Line length: 61.6 km (38.3 mi)
- Number of tracks: Entire line single tracked
- Character: Fairly rural with a few urban areas
- Track gauge: 1,067 mm (3 ft 6 in)
- Electrification: None
- Operating speed: 85 km/h (53 mph)
Route map
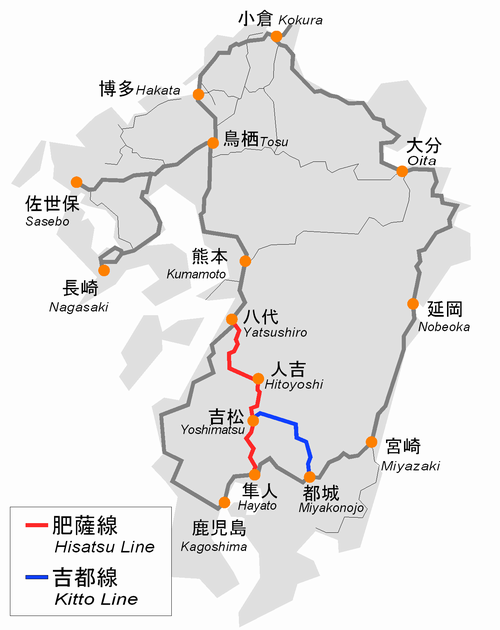

The Kitto Line (吉都線, Kitto-sen) is a railway line on the island of Kyushu, Japan. It connects Yoshimatsu Station in Yūsui, Kagoshima Prefecture with Miyakonojō Station in Miyakonojō, Miyazaki Prefecture. It is also known as the Ebino Kōgen Line (えびの高原線, Ebino-kōgen-sen) together with the Yatsushiro–Yoshimatsu segment of the Hisatsu Line. Between 1916 and 1923, this line was part of the original rail connection from Kokura to Miyazaki, until the opening of the Nippo Main Line.

== Stations ==
Station		Distance (km)	Transfers	Location	
Yoshimatsu	吉松	0.0	■ Hisatsu Line	Yūsui, Aira District	Kagoshima
Tsurumaru	鶴丸	2.6		Yūsui, Aira District	Kagoshima
Kyōmachi Onsen	京町温泉	5.0		Ebino	Miyazaki
Ebino	えびの	9.6		Ebino	Miyazaki
Ebino Uwae	えびの上江	13.0		Ebino	Miyazaki
Ebino Iino	えびの飯野	15.0		Ebino	Miyazaki
Nishi Kobayashi	西小林	20.6		Kobayashi	Miyazaki
Kobayashi	小林	26.8		Kobayashi	Miyazaki
Hirowara	広原	30.8		Takaharu; Nishimorokata District	Miyazaki
Takaharu	高原	34.8		Takaharu; Nishimorokata District	Miyazaki
Hyūga Maeda	日向前田	39.4		Miyakonojō	Miyazaki
Takasaki Shinden	高崎新田	43.8		Miyakonojō	Miyazaki
Higashi Takasaki	東高崎	48.1		Miyakonojō	Miyazaki
Mangatsuka	万ケ塚	51.0		Miyakonojō	Miyazaki
Tanigashira	谷頭	54.5		Miyakonojō	Miyazaki
Hyūga Shōnai	日向庄内	57.5		Miyakonojō	Miyazaki
Miyakonojō	都城	57.5	■ Nippō Main Line	Miyakonojō	Miyazaki

== History ==
The Yoshimatsu–Kobayashi section opened in 1912, and was extended to Miyakonojo the following year. Construction continued east and opened to Miyazaki in 1916, with the line formally named the Miyazaki Main Line in 1917.

With the opening of the Nippo Main Line from Kokura to Miyazaki in 1923, the line adopted that name. In 1932, with the opening of the Miyakonojo–Hayato line, that became part of the Nippo Main Line, and this line's name became the Kitto Line.

Freight service ceased in 1987.
