= Japan National Route 268 =

Road in Japan

National Route 268
- 国道268号
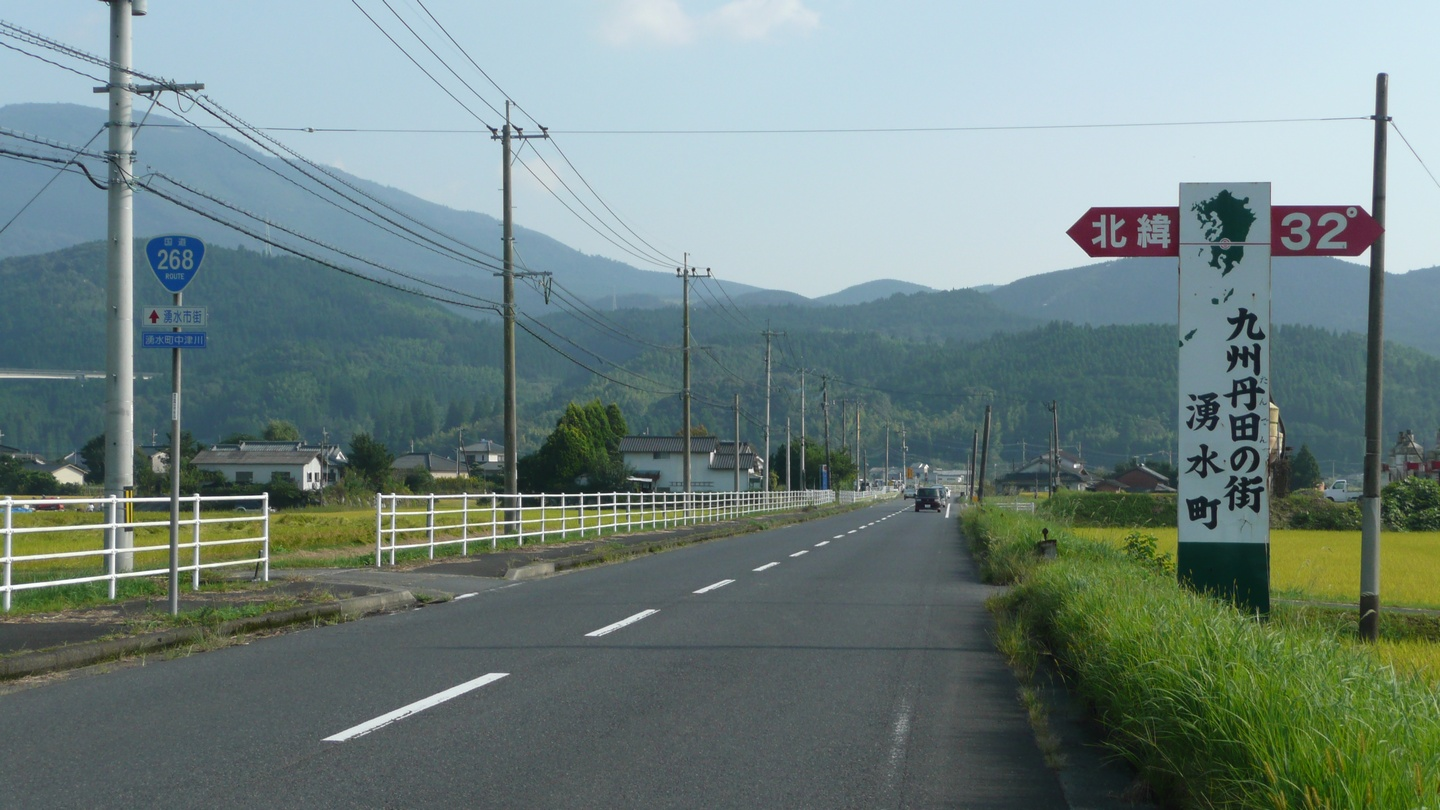

Route information
- Length: 114.3 km (71.0 mi)

Location
- Country: Japan

Highway system
- National highways of Japan; Expressways of Japan
← National Route 267	→ National Route 269

National Route 268 is a national highway of Japan connecting Minamata, Kumamoto and Miyazaki, Miyazaki in Japan, with a total length of 114.3 km (71.02 mi).
