= Kobayashi Station (Miyazaki) =

Railway station in Kobayashi, Miyazaki Prefecture, Japan

Kobayashi Station 小林駅
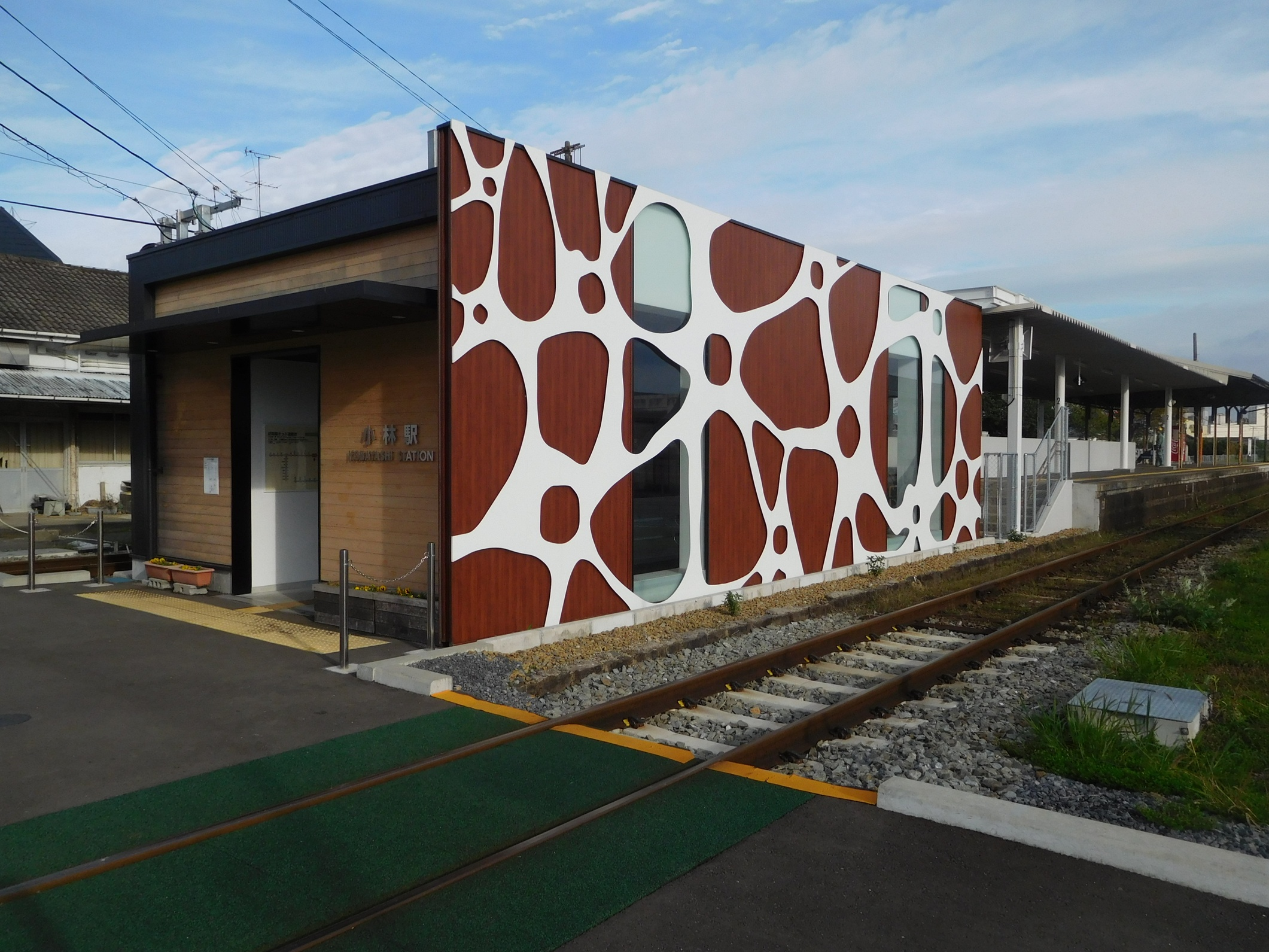
- Kobayashi Station in 2015

General information
- Location: Ekiminami, Kobayashi-shi, Miyazaki-ken 886-0009; Japan
- Coordinates: 31°59′28″N 130°58′32″E
- Operator: JR Kyushu
- Line: ■ Kitto Line
- Distance: 34.8 km from Miyakonojō
- Platforms: 1 island platform
- Tracks: 1 + sidings

Construction
- Structure type: At grade
- Parking: At nearby community centre
- Cycle facilities: Bike shed
- Accessible: Yes - ramp to platform

Other information
- Status: Staffed ticket window (outsourced)
- Website: Official website

History
- Opened: 1 October 1912
- Rebuilt: 2015
- Former names: Kobayashimachi (until 1 March 1951)

Passengers
- FY2016: 458 daily
- Rank: 253rd (among JR Kyushu stations)

Services
Preceding station	JR Kyushu	Following station
Nishi Kobayashi towards Yoshimatsu	Kitto Line	Hirowara towards Miyakonojō
Location
- Location within Miyazaki Prefecture Location within Japan

Kobayashi Station (小林駅, Kobayashi-eki) is a passenger railway station located in the city of Kobayashi, Miyazaki Prefecture, Japan. It is operated by JR Kyushu and is on the Kitto Line.

== Lines ==
The station is served by the Kitto Line and is located 34.8 km from the starting point of the line at Miyakonojō.

== Layout ==
The station consists of an island platform serving two tracks at grade with sidings branching off track 2. The station building is a steel frame cuboidal structure located next to the island platform in between the two tracks. It houses an automatic ticket vending machine and a staffed ticket window. After the ticket gate, a short flight of steps and a ramp leads up to the island platform. Access to the station building is possible from access roads on both sides of the tracks by means of a level crossing.

Management of the passenger facilities at the station has been outsourced to the JR Kyushu Tetsudou Eigyou Co., a wholly owned subsidiary of JR Kyushu specialising in station services. It staffs the ticket booth which is equipped with a POS machine but does not have a Midori no Madoguchi facility.

=== Platforms ===
1	■ ■ Kitto Line	for Miyakonojō and Miyazaki
2	■ ■ Kitto Line	for Yoshimatsu and Hayato

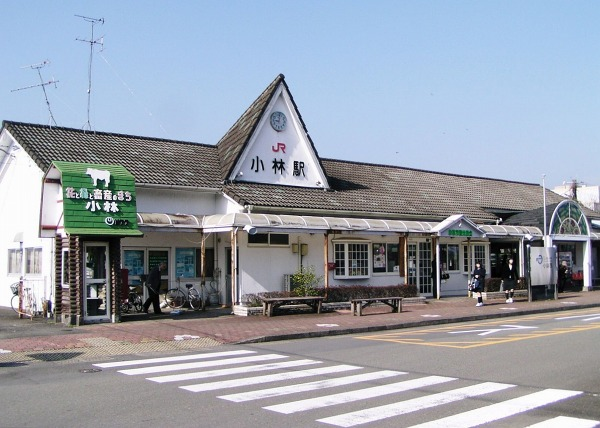
The old station building, which has since been demolished.

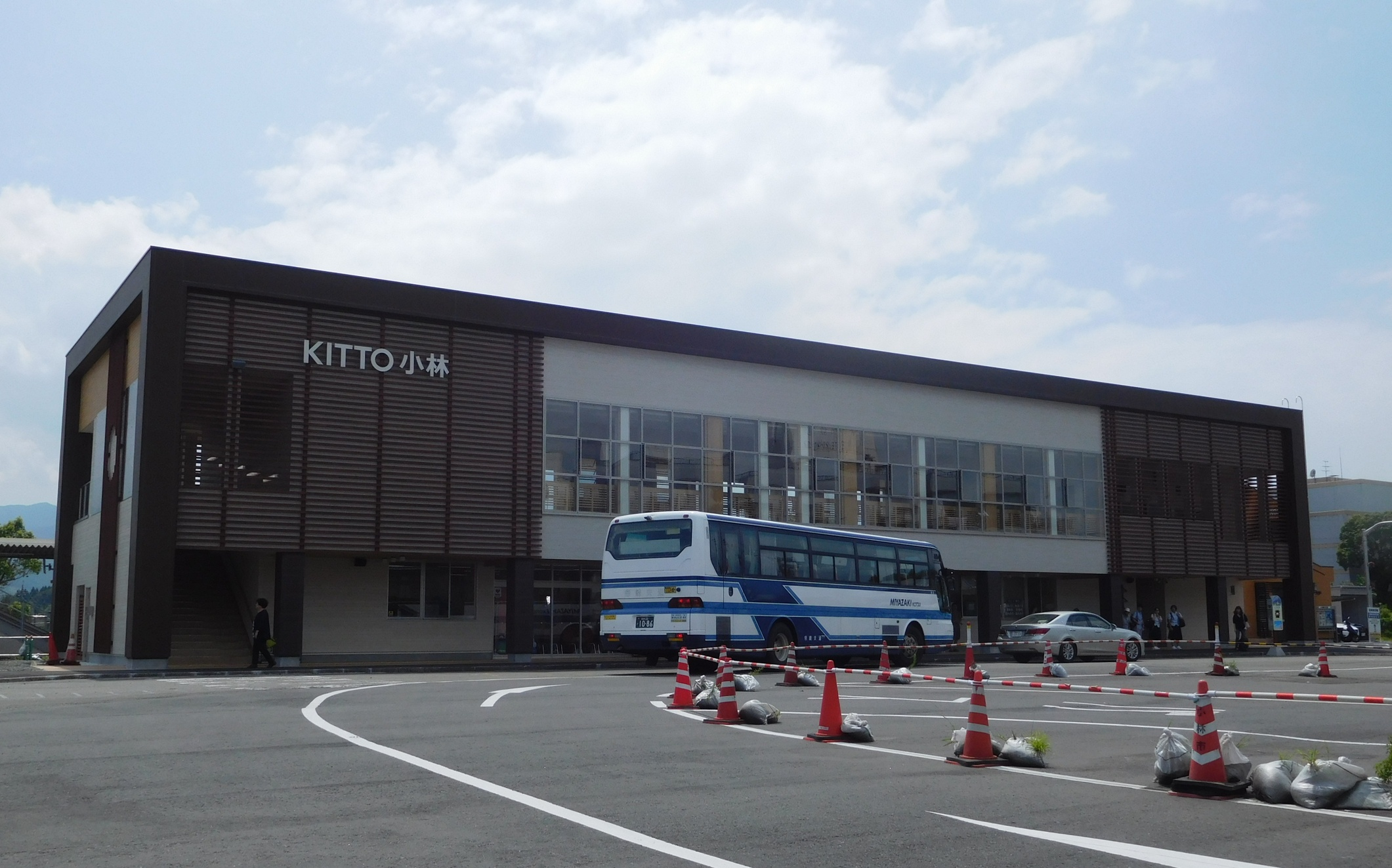
A community centre and tourist information office, built on the site of the old stationbuilding. The new station is just behind it.

== History ==
The station was opened by Japanese Government Railways (JGR) on 1 October 1912 with the name Kobayashimachi Station (小林町駅) as the eastern terminus of a line from Yoshimatsu during the first phase of the construction of what it then designated as the Miyazaki Line, and later, in 1917, as the Miyazaki Main Line. On 15 December 1923, the stretch of track between Yoshimatsu and Miyakonojō which included Kobayashimachi, was designated as part of the Nippō Main Line. On 6 December 1932, the same stretch was separated out and was designated as the Kitto Line with Miyakonojō as the starting point. On 1 March 1951, the station name was changed from Kobayashimachi to Kobayashi. With the privatization of Japanese National Railways (JNR) on 1 April 1987, Kobayashi came under the control of JR Kyushu.

On 15 March 2015, a new station building was opened, situated between the tracks and adjacent to the island platform. Together with this, a new level crossing provided access to the station building as well as facilitating pedestrian crossing of the tracks was constructed. In October 2016, the old station building, a wooden Japanese style structure, was demolished. A community centre "KITTO Kobayashi" was built on the site (see below).

== Passenger statistics ==
In fiscal 2016, the station was used by an average of 458 passengers daily (boarding passengers only), and it ranked 253rd among the busiest stations of JR Kyushu.

== Surrounding area ==
- KITTO Kobayashi - a municipal building housing tourist information offices, a community centre, and a bus station.
- Kobayashi City Hall

== See also ==
- List of railway stations in Japan
