= Yoshimatsu Station =

Railway station in Yūsui, Kagoshima Prefecture, Japan

Yoshimatsu Station 吉松駅
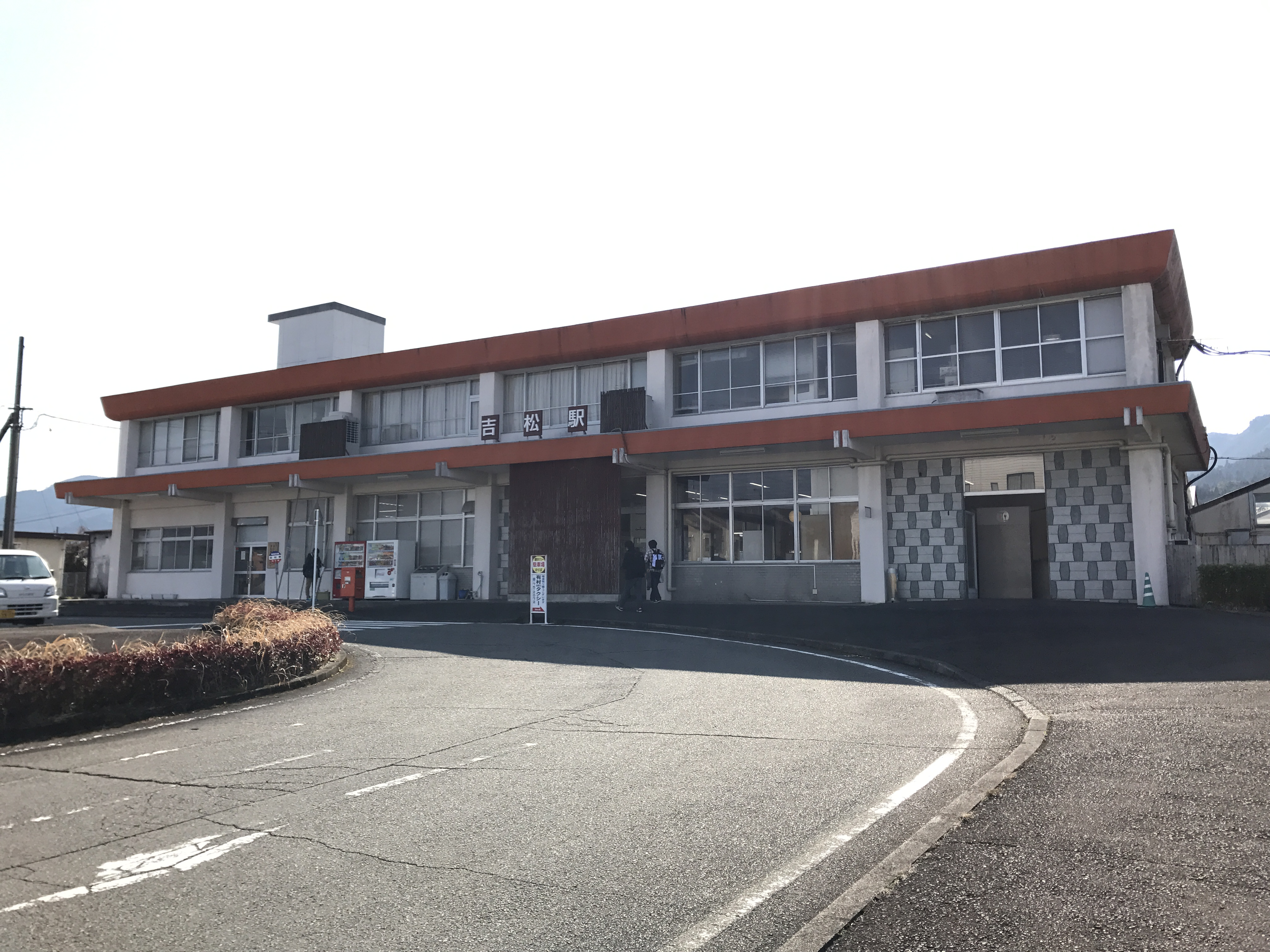
- Yoshimatsu Station in March 2017

General information
- Location: 968, Kawanishi, Yūsui-cho, Aira-gun, Kagoshima-ken 899-6104; Japan
- Coordinates: 32.0109°N 130.7382°E
- Operator: JR Kyushu
- Line: ■ Hisatsu Line ■ Kitto Line
- Distance: 86.8 km from Yatsushiro
- Platforms: 1 island platform

Construction
- Accessible: No - platforms linked by footbridge

Other information
- Website: Official website

History
- Opened: 5 September 1903

Passengers
- FY2013: 229

Services
Preceding station	JR Kyushu	Following station
Masaki towards Yatsushiro	Hisatsu Line	Kurino towards Hayato
Terminus	Kitto Line	Tsurumaru towards Miyakonojō
Location
- Location within Kagoshima Prefecture Location within Japan

Yoshimatsu Station (吉松駅, Yoshimatsu-eki) is a junction passenger railway station located in the town of Yūsui, Aira District, Kagoshima Prefecture, Japan. It is operated by JR Kyushu.

== Lines ==
The station is served by the Hisatsu Line and is located 86.8 km from the starting point of the line at Yatsushiro. It is also the terminus of the 61.6 kilometer Kitto Line to Miyakonojō.

== Layout ==
The station consists of one island platform with two tracks at grade. The station building and the platform can be accessed via a footbridge on the north side. Adjacent to the station building, there is a side platform that is no longer in use. The current station building (second generation) is a two-story reinforced concrete building with a waiting area, ticket gate, and ticket office on the first floor. The previous (first generation) station building was made of wood. There is a waiting area outside the ticket gate, which has a tatami room with a hearth, and an upright piano was installed on March 11, 2017 through a street piano project conducted by volunteers in Kagoshima Prefecture. The station is unattended.

=== Platforms ===
1	■ ■ Hisatsu Line	for Hitoyoshi and Kumamoto for Hayato and Kagoshima
2	■ ■ Kitto Line	for Miyakonojō and Miyazaki

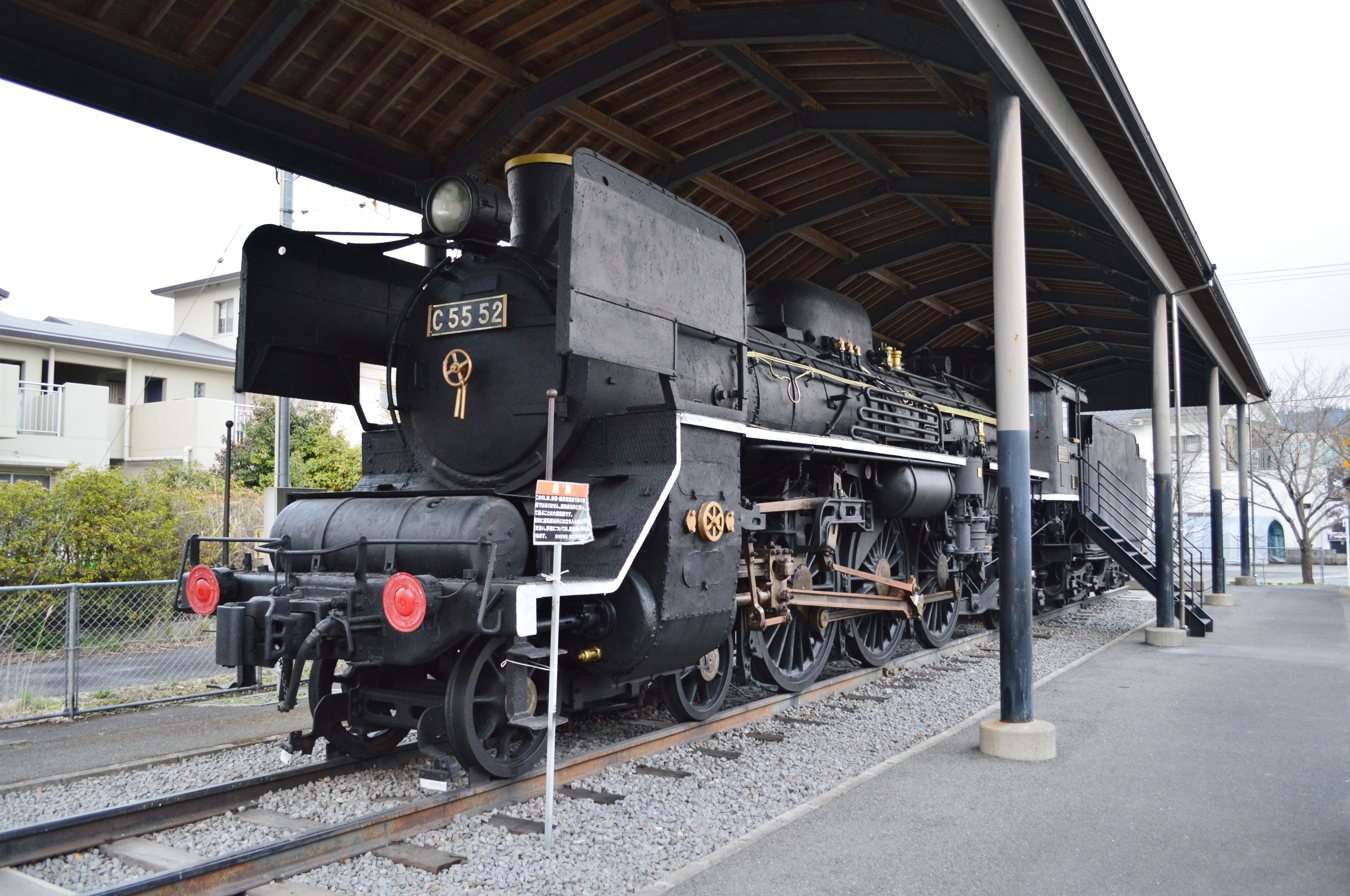
C55 52 at Yoshimatsu Station

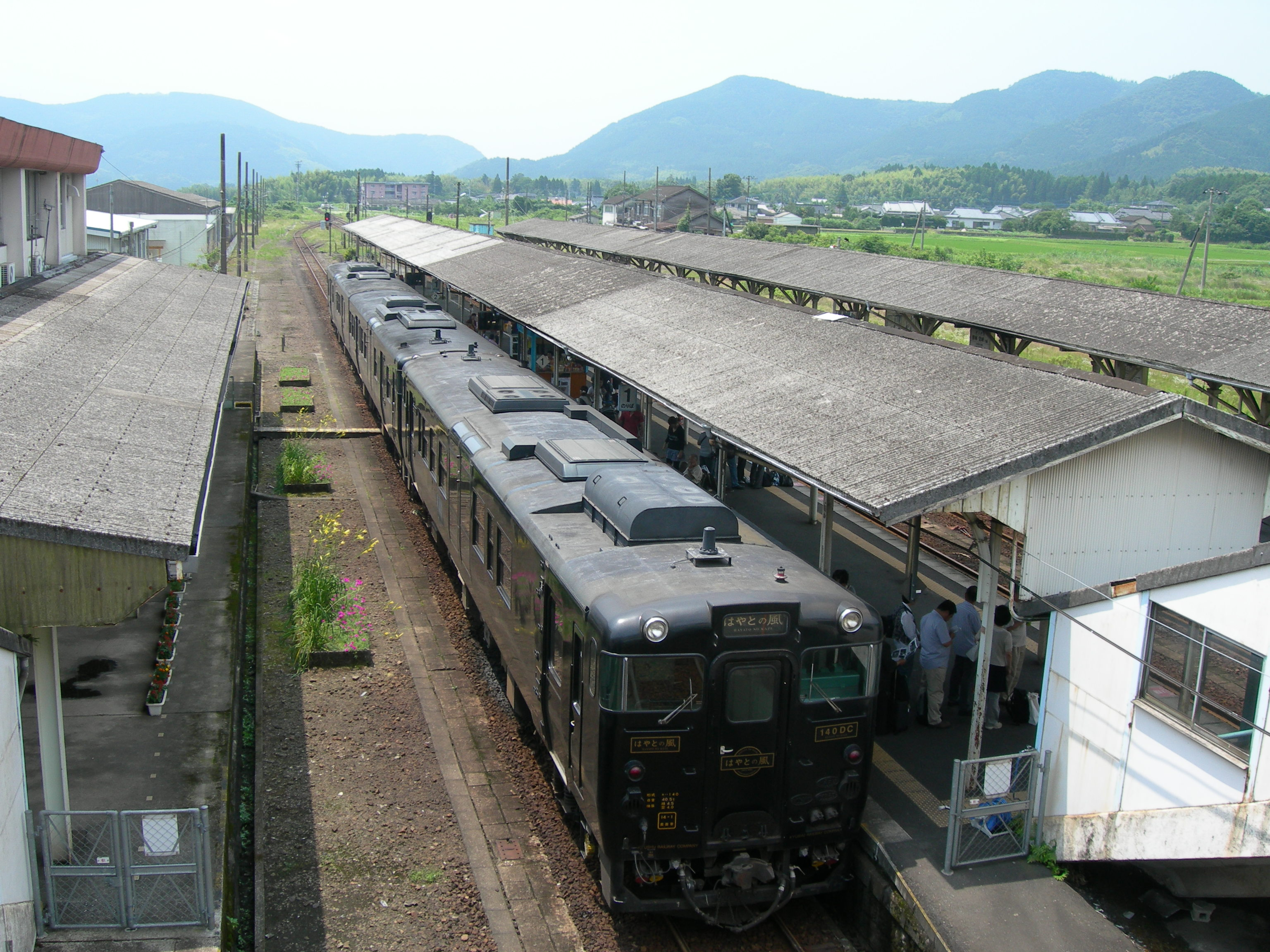
Platform

== History ==
The station was opened by Japanese Government Railways (JGR) on 5 September 1903 in conjunction with the extension of the Kagoshima Line from Yokogawa Station (currently Osumi Yokogawa Station) to this station. With the privatization of Japanese National Railways (JNR), the successor of JGR, on 1 April 1987, Nishi Kobayashi came under the control of JR Kyushu. The Yamano Line was abolished on 1 February 1988.

== Passenger statistics ==
In fiscal 2013, the station was used by an average of 229 passengers daily

== Surrounding area ==
- Yoshimatsu Post office
- Yūsui Town Hall Yoshimatsu Branch
- National Route 268
- Yūsui Town Yoshimatsu Elementary School
- Yūsui Town Yoshimatsu Junior High School
- Kyūshū Expressway Yoshimatsu Parking Area
- Kagoshima Prison

== See also ==
- List of railway stations in Japan
