= Miyakonojō Station =

Railway station in Miyakonojō, Miyazaki Prefecture, Japan

Miyakonojō Station 都城駅
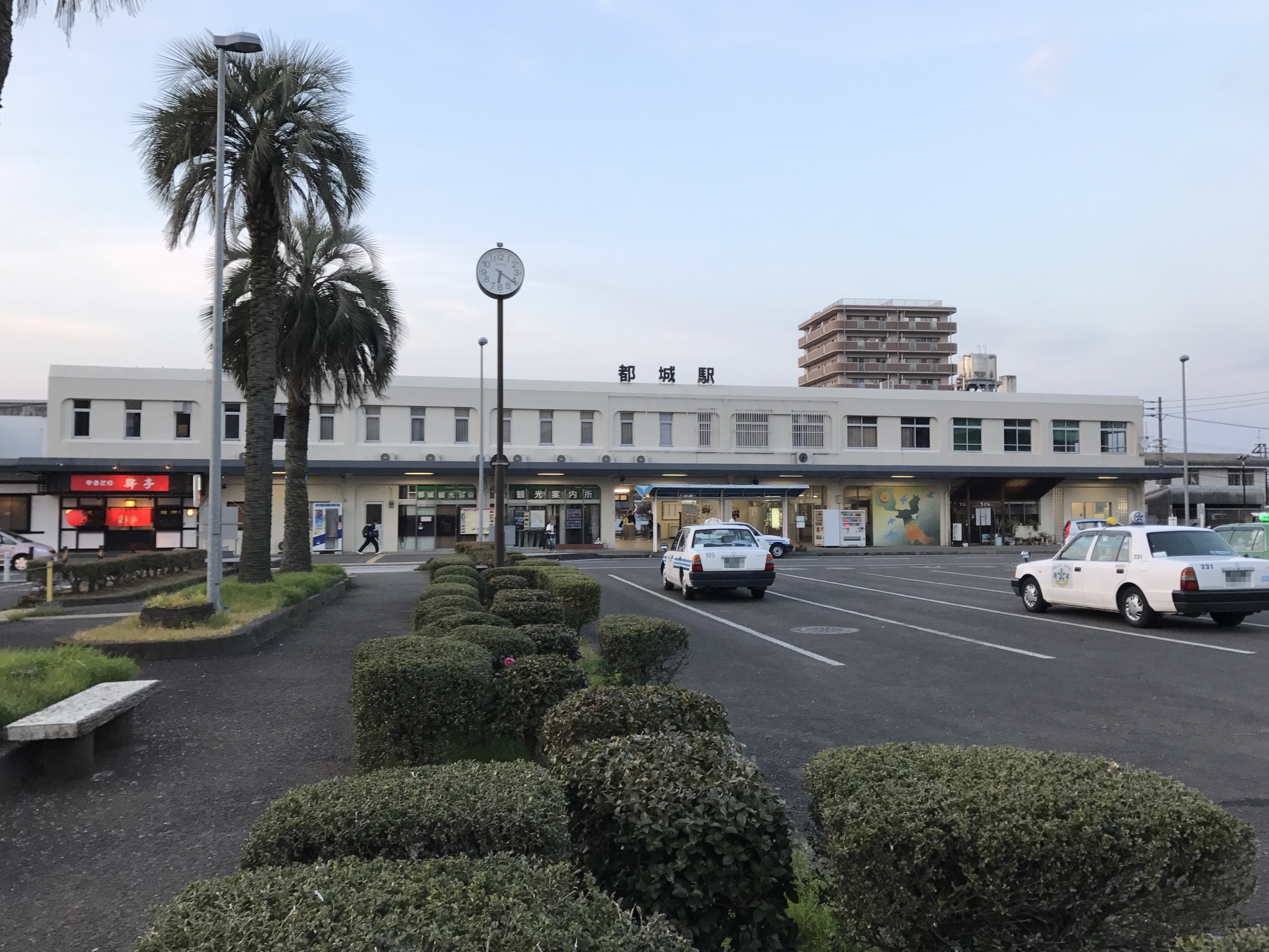
- Miyakonojō Station in March 2017

General information
- Location: 4553 Sakaemachi, Miyakonojō-shi, Miyazaki-ken 885-0023; Japan
- Coordinates: 31°44′11″N 131°4′29″E
- Operator: JR Kyushu
- Line: ■ Nippō Main Line ■ Kitto Line
- Distance: 389.9 km from Kokura
- Platforms: 1 side + 2 island platforms
- Connections: Bus terminal

Construction
- Accessible: Yes, elevators on platforms

Other information
- Status: Staffed (Midori no Madoguchi)
- Website: Official website

History
- Opened: 8 October 1913

Passengers
- FY2016: 1,111 daily
- Rank: 152nd (among JR Kyushu stations)

Services
Preceding station	JR Kyushu	Following station
Nishi-Miyakonojō towards Kagoshima	Nippō Main Line	Mimata towards Kokura
Hyūga Shōnai towards Yoshimatsu	Kitto Line	Terminus
Location
- Location within Miyazaki Prefecture Location within Japan

Miyakonojō Station (都城駅, Miyakonojō-eki) is a junction passenger railway station located in the city of Miyakonojō, Miyazaki, Japan, operated by JR Kyushu.

== Lines ==
The station is served by the Nippō Main Line and is located 389.9 km from the starting point of the line at Kokura. It is also the terminal station on the Kitto Line and is 61.6 kilometers from the opposing terminus of that line at Yoshimatsu.

== Station layout ==
The station consists of one side platform and two island platforms as well as multiple sidings. The side platform is adjacent to the station building and is connected to the island platforms by footbridges. Next to track 1 is the former freight platform, but the middle track (track 2) between tracks 1 and 3 has been removed. Barrier-free construction was completed on March 15, 2014, and elevators were installed on the footbridge and on each platform. The station has a Midori no Madoguchi staffed ticket office.

=== Platforms ===
1-3	■ ■ Nippō Main Line	for Minami-Miyazaki and Miyazaki for Hayato and Kagoshima-Chūō
4-5	■ ■ Kitto Line	for Kobayashi and Yoshimatsu

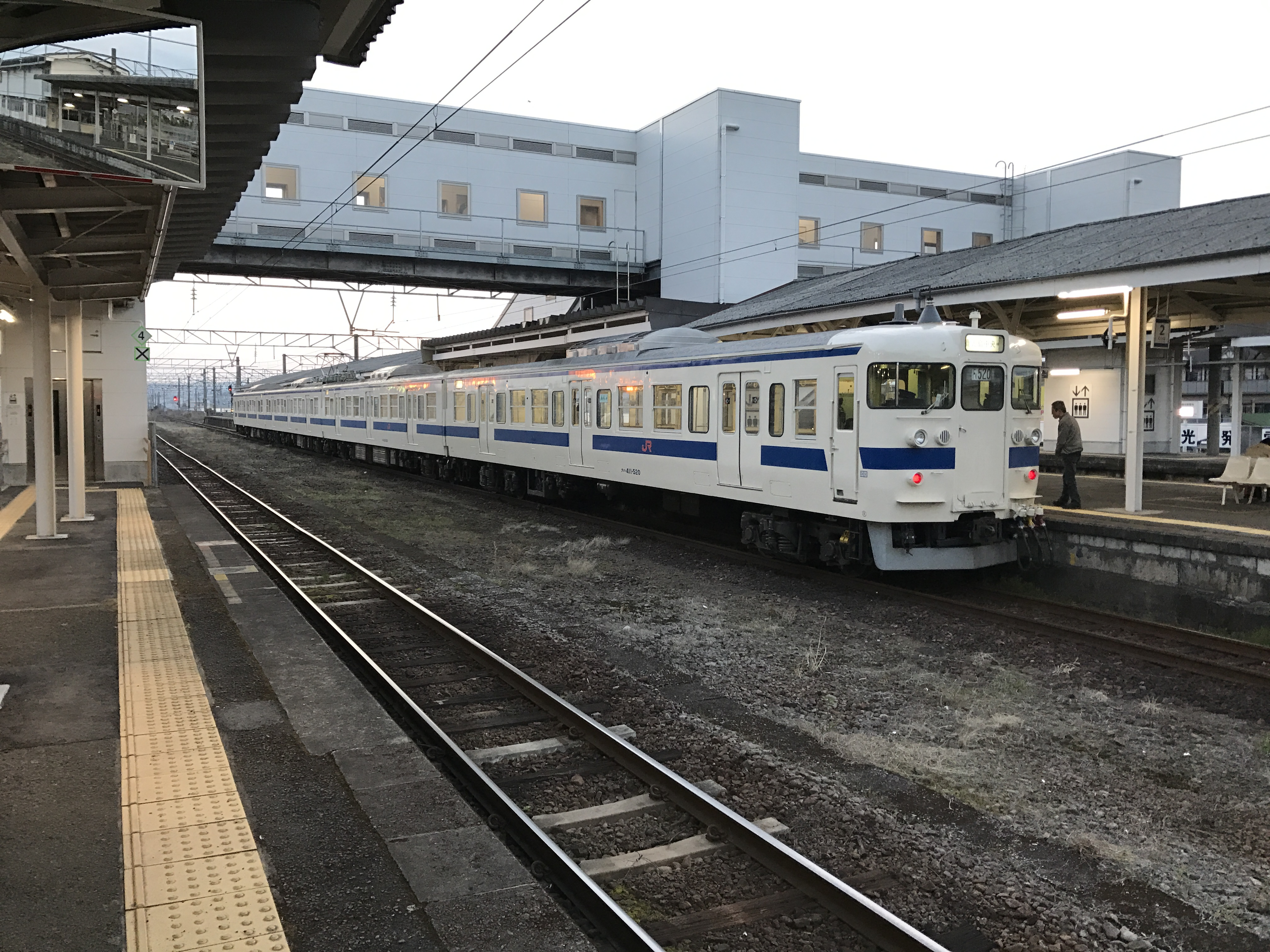
415 series set FK520 at Miyakonojō Station

== History ==
Japanese Government Railways opened Miyakonojō Station on 8 October 1913 as the eastern terminus of its then Miyazaki Line which it had been extending eastwards from Yoshimatsu since 1912. On 11 Feb 1914, Miyakonojō became a through-station when the track was extended towards the northeast to Mimata. By 21 September 1917, the track had reached Miyazaki and line was renamed the Miyazaki Main Line. By 1923, the track had reached north to link up with the track of the Nippō Main Line at Shigeoka. The entire stretch through Miyazaki, Miyakonojō to Yoshimatsu was then redesignated as part of the Nippō Main Line on 15 December 1923.

By this time, the extension of the track south and west towards Kagoshima from Miyakonojō had also begun. On 14 January 1923, Japanese Government Railways opened the Shibushi Line from Miyakonojō through Nishi-Miyakonojō to Sueyoshi (now closed). By 1932, various lines stretching to Kagoshima had been linked up and through-traffic had been achieved. The lines serving Miyakonojō were redesignated. The stretch to Yoshimatsu (running generally northeast) was designated as the Kitto Line with Miyakonojō as the eastern terminus. The other tracks, with lines of various names now linked up to Kagoshima were designated as part of the Nippō Main Line. Cargo handling at the station was abolished in November 1986, and the Miyakonojo Container Center was established as a replacement. It was later renamed Miyakonojo Ofrail Station in April 2006. With the privatization of Japanese National Railways, the successor to Japanese Government Railways, on 1 April 1987, the station came under the control of Kyushu Railway Company.

== Passenger statistics ==
In fiscal 2016, the station was used by an average of 1,111 passengers daily (boarding passengers only), and it ranked 152nd among the busiest stations of JR Kyushu.

== Surrounding area ==
- Miyakonojo City Shukiyoshi Elementary School
- Miyakonojo City Shukiyoshi Junior High School
- Miyazaki Prefectural Miyakonojo Agricultural High School

== See also ==
- List of railway stations in Japan
