= Miyazaki Expressway =

Expressway in Miyazaki prefecture, Japan

Miyazaki Expressway
- 宮崎自動車道

Route information
- Length: 80.7 km (50.1 mi)
- Existed: 1976–present

Major junctions
- From: Ebino Junction in Ebino; Kyushu Expressway
- To: Miyazaki Interchange in Miyazaki; Hitotsuba Toll Road

Location
- Country: Japan
- Major cities: Kobayashi, Miyakonojō

Highway system
- National highways of Japan; Expressways of Japan

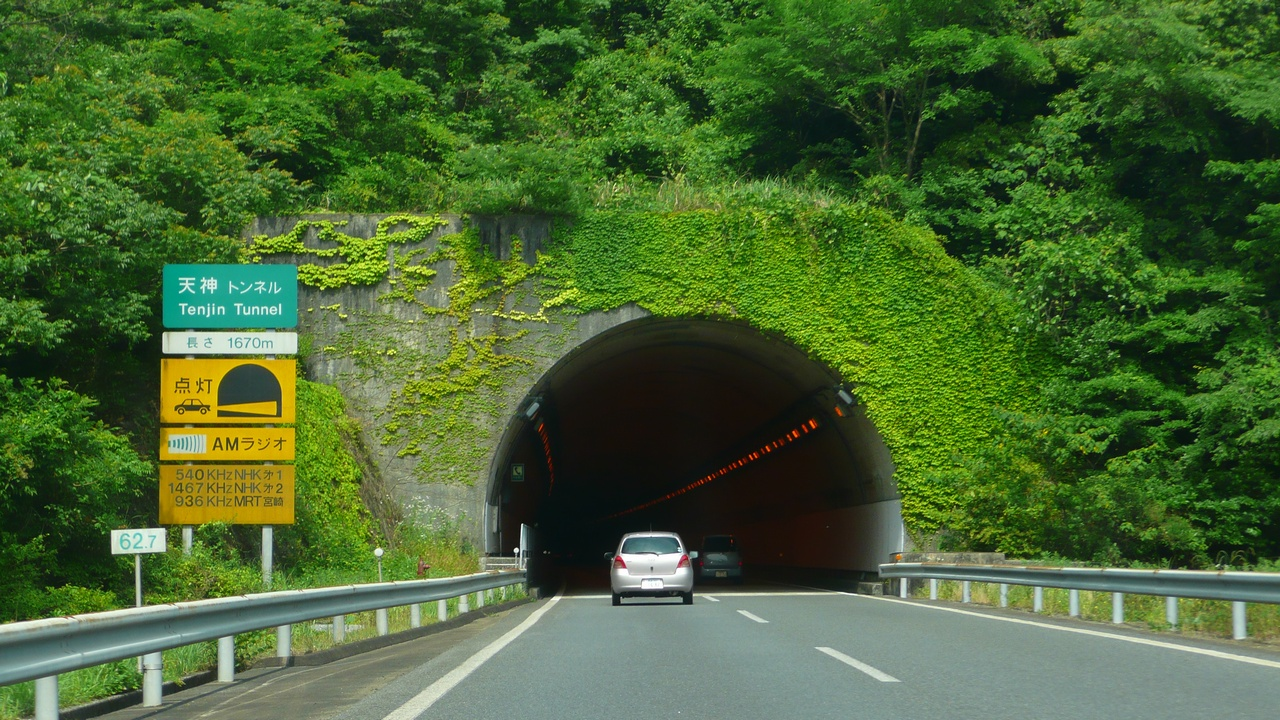
Tenjin Tunnel Eastern Side, Miyazaki, Japan

Miyazaki Expressway (宮崎自動車道, Miyazaki Jidōsha-dō) is one of the Expressways of Japan from Ebino to Miyazaki linking with the Higashikyushu Expressway. It runs through the southern half of the Miyazaki prefecture. The expressway is 80.7 kilometres (50.1 mi) long.

== History ==
- March 4, 1976 – The Ebino Junction with the Kyushu Expressway to Takaharu Interchange was opened.
- March 17, 1981 – A section from Takaharu to Miyakonojō Interchanges was opened to traffic.
- October 29, 1981 – A section from Miyakonojō to Miyazaki Interchanges was opened to traffic which made the Miyazaki Expressway from Ebino to Miyazaki fully accessible with no gaps.
- March 25, 2000 – The Kiyotake Junction to the east was opened to traffic.
- October 1, 2005 – Following privatisation of JH it came under the control of NEXCO West Japan.

== Interchanges ==
- IC - interchange, SIC - smart interchange, JCT - junction, SA - service area, PA - parking area, BS - bus stop, TN - tunnel, BR - bridge
- Bus stops labeled "○" are currently in use; those marked "◆" are closed.

No.	Name	Connections	Dist. from Origin	Bus Stop	Notes	Location (all in Miyazaki)
(21)	Ebino JCT	Kyushu Expressway	0.0			Ebino
BS	Iino BS		7.6	○		Ebino
1	Kobayashi IC	Pref. Route 1 (Kobayashi Ebino Kogen Makizono Route)	15.9	○		Kobayashi
SA	Kirishima SA		18.7			Kobayashi
2	Takaharu IC	National Route 221	26.5	○		Takaharu
PA	Hyūga Takasaki PA		30.1			Miyakonojō
BS	Takasaki-Higashi BS		38.0	○		Miyakonojō
BS	Miyakonojō-Kita BS		45.8	○		Miyakonojō
3	Miyakonojō IC	National Route 10; Miyakonojō Shibushi Road (planned)	46.9			Miyakonojō
BS	Takajō BS		50.5	○		Miyakonojō
3-1	Yamanokuchi SA/SIA	National Route 269 via Miyakonojō city road	51.9			Miyakonojō
TN	Tenjin Tunnel				northbound: 1,670 m (5,480 ft) southbound: 1,648 m (5,407 ft)	Miyazaki
4	Tano IC	Pref. Route 28 (Nichinan Takaoka Route)	68.0	○		Miyazaki
BS	Tano-Higashi BS		70.1	○		Miyazaki
(4-1)	Kiyotake JCT	Higashikyushu Expressway	74.3			Miyazaki
BS	Kiyotake BS		78.0	○		Miyazaki
PA	Kiyotake PA		78.7		Only accessible for Ebino	Miyazaki
TB	Miyazaki TB		79.0			Miyazaki
PA	Kiyotake PA		79.2		Only accessible for Miyazaki	Miyazaki
5	Miyazaki IC	National Route 220 (Miyazaki-Minami Bypass)	80.7			Miyazaki
Through to Hitotsuba Toll Road

== Lanes ==
- 4-lane
