= Aoidake Station =

Railway station in Miyakonojō, Miyazaki Prefecture, Japan

Aoidake Station 青井岳駅
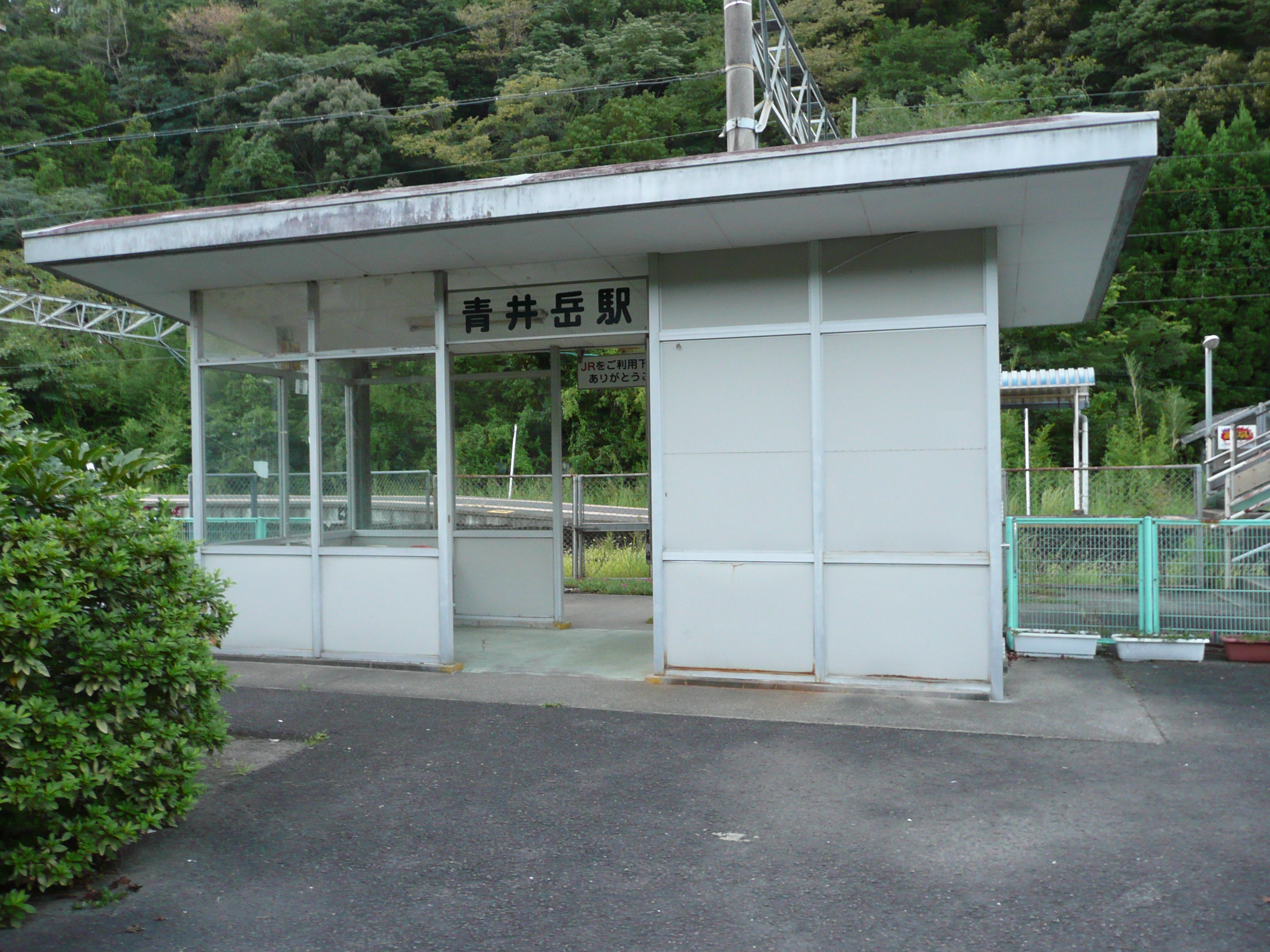
- Aoidake Station in 2007

General information
- Location: Yamanokuchicho Yamanokuchi, Miyakonojo-shi, Miyazaki-ken 889-1803; Japan
- Coordinates: 31°49′40″N 131°13′04″E
- Operator: JR Kyushu
- Line: ■ Nippō Main Line
- Distance: 369.3 km from Kokura
- Platforms: 1 island platform
- Tracks: 2 + 2 sidings

Construction
- Structure type: At grade
- Accessible: No - platform accessed by footbridge

Other information
- Status: Unstaffed
- Website: Official website

History
- Opened: 21 March 1916

Passengers
- FY2016: 14 daily

Services
Preceding station	JR Kyushu	Following station
Yamanokuchi towards Kagoshima	Nippō Main Line	Tano towards Kokura
Location
- Location within Miyazaki Prefecture Location within Japan

Aoidake Station (青井岳駅, Aoidake-eki) is a passenger railway station located in the city of Miyakonojō, Miyazaki, Japan. It is operated by JR Kyushu.

== Lines ==
The station is served by the Nippō Main Line and is located 369.3 km from the starting point of the line at Kokura.

== Layout ==
The station, which is unstaffed, consists of an island platform serving two tracks with two sidings. The station building is a modern steel frame function structure which houses a waiting area and an automatic ticket vending machine. Access to the island platform is by means of a footbridge.

=== Platforms ===
1	■ ■ Nippō Main Line	for Miyakonojō and Kagoshima-Chūō
2	■ ■ Nippō Main Line	for Minami-Miyazaki and Miyazaki

== History ==
Japanese Government Railways (JGR) opened the Miyazaki Line from Yoshimatsu to Miyakonojō on 8 October 1913. The track was extended eastward in phases, with Aoidake opening as the new terminus on 21 March 1916. On 25 October 1916, the track linked up with a track from Miyazaki at Kiyotake and the line was renamed the Miyazaki Main Line on 21 September 1917. By 1923, the track from Miyazaki has extended north to link up with the track of the Nippō Main Line at Shigeoka. On 15 December 1923, the entire stretch of track from Shigeoka through Miyazaki to Yoshimatsu, including Aoidake, was designated as part of the Nippō Main Line. Freight services were discontinued in 1962 and baggage handling in 1979. With the privatization of Japanese National Railways (JNR), the successor of JGR, on 1 April 1987, the Aoidake came under the control of JR Kyushu.

Beginning on March 15, 2025, local trains in the evening and early morning hours have bypassed the station.

== Passenger statistics ==
In fiscal 2016, the station was used by an average of 14 passengers (boarding only) per day.

== Surrounding area ==
- Japan National Route 269
- Miyazaki Expressway (bridge visible from the tracks)
- Aoidake Onsen

== See also ==
- List of railway stations in Japan
