= Miyakonojō =

Miyakonojō 都城市
- City
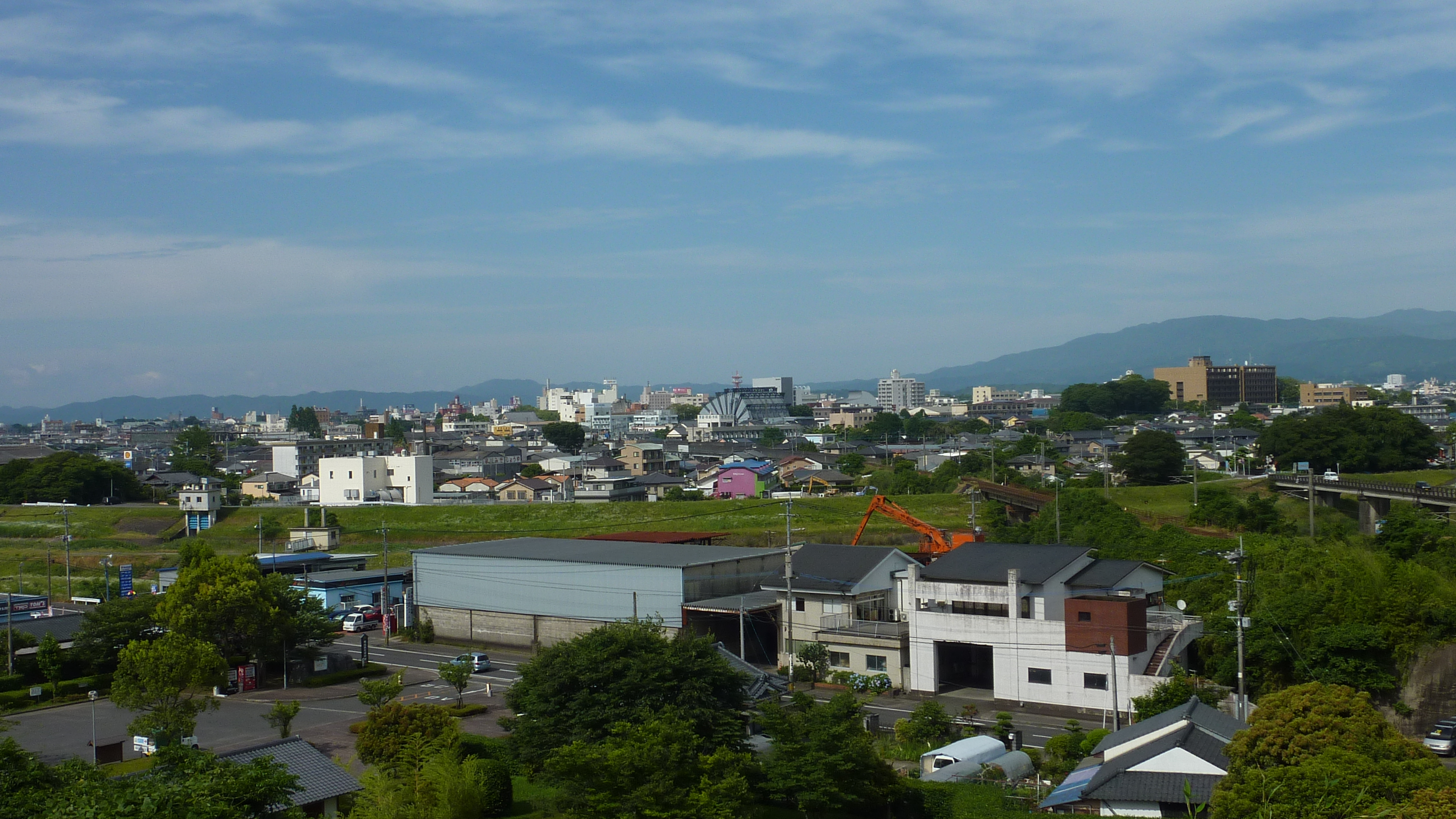
- View of downtown Miyakonojo, from Miyakonojo Castle Ruin Park

- Flag Emblem
- Interactive map of Miyakonojō
- Location in Japan
- Coordinates: 31°43′10″N 131°03′42″E
- Country: Japan
- Region: Kyushu
- Prefecture: Miyazaki

Government
  - Mayor: Takahisa Ikeda

Area
  - Total: 653.36 km^{2} (252.26 sq mi)

Population (November 1, 2023)
  - Total: 158,235
  - Density: 242.19/km^{2} (627.26/sq mi)
- Time zone: UTC+09:00 (JST)
- City hall address: 6-21 Himegichō, Miyakonojō-shi, Miyazaki-ken 885-8555
- Climate: Cfa
- Website: Official website
- Symbols
- Flower: Iris
- Tree: Japanese zelkova

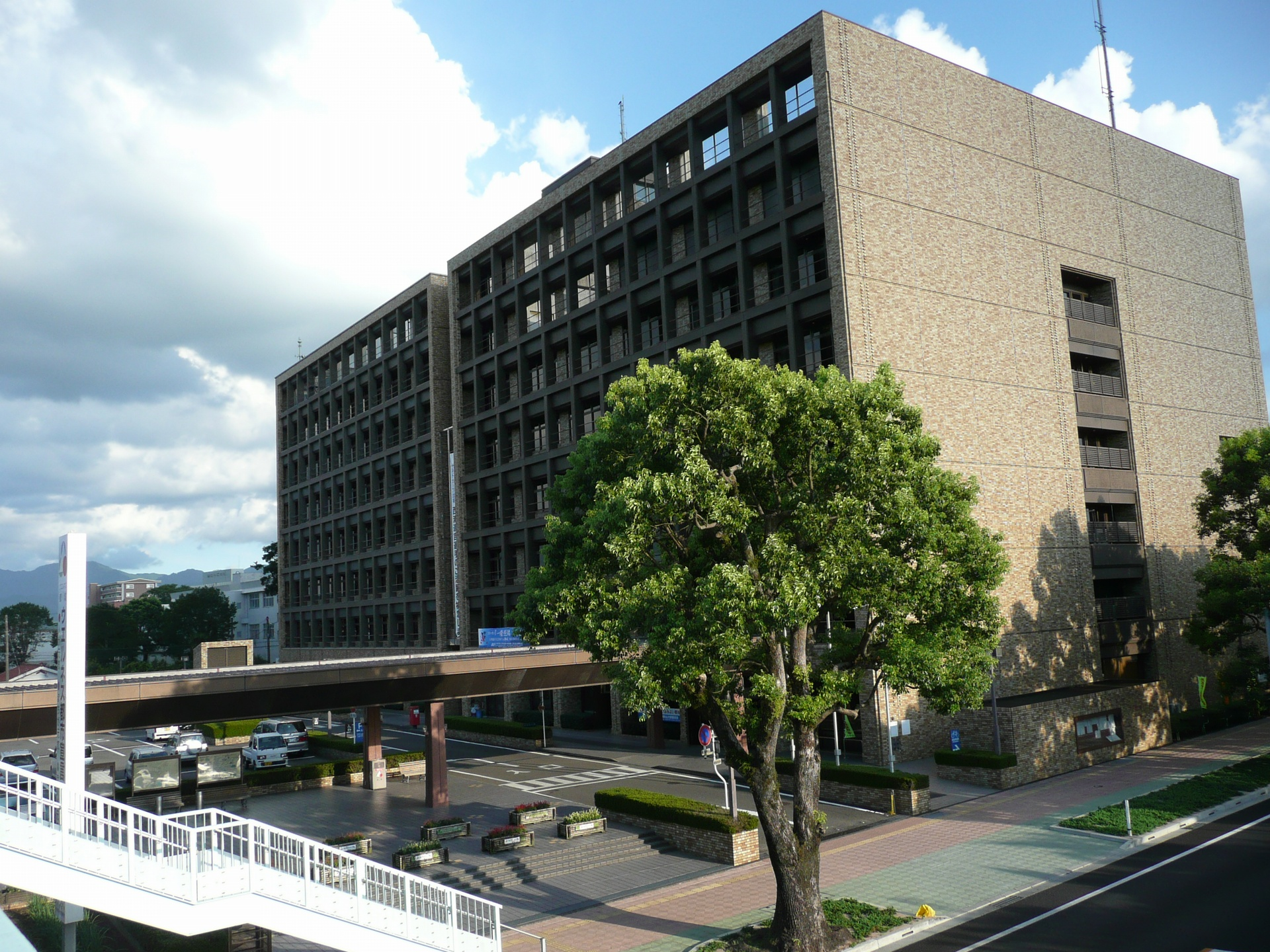
Miyakonojō City Office

Miyakonojō (都城市, Miyakonojō-shi) is a city in Miyazaki Prefecture, Japan. As of 1 November 2023, the city had an estimated population of 158,235 in 72,394 households, and a population density of 240 persons per km^{2}. The total area of the city is 653.36 km^{2} (252.26 sq mi), making it the largest city in the prefecture in terms of area.

== Geography ==
Miyakonojō is located at the southwestern tip of Miyazaki Prefecture in the Miyakonojō basin, approximately 50 km west-southwest of Miyazaki City and approximately 90 km east-northeast of Kagoshima City. The northern, western, and southern parts of the city border Kagoshima Prefecture. The Ōyodo River flows roughly from north to south through the center of the city, and the city is surrounded by the Kirishima Mountains to the west and the Wanizuka Mountains to the east.

=== Neighboring municipalities ===
Kagoshima Prefecture

- Kirishima
- Shibushi
- Soo

Miyazaki Prefecture

- Kobayashi
- Kushima
- Mimata
- Miyazaki
- Nichinan
- Takaharu

=== Climate ===
Miyakonojō has a humid subtropical climate (Köppen climate classification Cfa), but is cooler than other cities in Miyazaki. The average temperature is 16.8 °C (62.2 °F), and it rains less than in Miyazaki City. The area's climate is influenced by its proximity to mountains.

Climate data for Miyakonojō (1991−2020 normals, extremes 1942−present)
Month	Jan	Feb	Mar	Apr	May	Jun	Jul	Aug	Sep	Oct	Nov	Dec	Year
Record high °C (°F)	24.3 (75.7)	23.6 (74.5)	27.4 (81.3)	30.4 (86.7)	34.0 (93.2)	35.2 (95.4)	37.3 (99.1)	39.4 (102.9)	35.2 (95.4)	34.0 (93.2)	28.0 (82.4)	24.4 (75.9)	39.4 (102.9)
Mean maximum °C (°F)	18.3 (64.9)	20.6 (69.1)	23.6 (74.5)	27.4 (81.3)	30.9 (87.6)	32.2 (90.0)	35.2 (95.4)	35.2 (95.4)	33.3 (91.9)	29.6 (85.3)	25.1 (77.2)	20.3 (68.5)	35.7 (96.3)
Mean daily maximum °C (°F)	12.1 (53.8)	13.7 (56.7)	16.9 (62.4)	21.6 (70.9)	25.5 (77.9)	27.1 (80.8)	31.4 (88.5)	32.1 (89.8)	29.3 (84.7)	24.8 (76.6)	19.5 (67.1)	14.2 (57.6)	22.4 (72.2)
Daily mean °C (°F)	6.1 (43.0)	7.7 (45.9)	11.0 (51.8)	15.6 (60.1)	19.8 (67.6)	22.7 (72.9)	26.7 (80.1)	27.0 (80.6)	24.2 (75.6)	19.1 (66.4)	13.5 (56.3)	8.1 (46.6)	16.8 (62.2)
Mean daily minimum °C (°F)	0.9 (33.6)	2.3 (36.1)	5.7 (42.3)	10.2 (50.4)	14.9 (58.8)	19.3 (66.7)	23.2 (73.8)	23.4 (74.1)	20.4 (68.7)	14.4 (57.9)	8.4 (47.1)	2.8 (37.0)	12.2 (53.9)
Mean minimum °C (°F)	−4.3 (24.3)	−3.8 (25.2)	−1.4 (29.5)	2.6 (36.7)	9.0 (48.2)	14.2 (57.6)	19.9 (67.8)	20.5 (68.9)	14.7 (58.5)	7.6 (45.7)	1.1 (34.0)	−3.2 (26.2)	−5.0 (23.0)
Record low °C (°F)	−9.8 (14.4)	−8.5 (16.7)	−5.9 (21.4)	−2.7 (27.1)	2.3 (36.1)	9.1 (48.4)	15.0 (59.0)	14.4 (57.9)	6.3 (43.3)	−0.8 (30.6)	−4.8 (23.4)	−7.8 (18.0)	−9.8 (14.4)
Average precipitation mm (inches)	66.1 (2.60)	106.2 (4.18)	163.3 (6.43)	184.3 (7.26)	207.8 (8.18)	559.7 (22.04)	447.0 (17.60)	320.9 (12.63)	314.2 (12.37)	131.6 (5.18)	94.0 (3.70)	74.6 (2.94)	2,694.2 (106.07)
Average precipitation days (≥ 1.0 mm)	6.6	8.1	11.5	10.1	9.9	16.4	13.2	12.7	12.5	7.6	7.5	5.9	122
Average relative humidity (%)	71	70	70	70	73	82	80	79	79	75	76	73	75
Mean monthly sunshine hours	167.2	155.2	169.4	173.9	169.2	103.1	168.2	183.6	149.1	172.4	158.5	164.8	1,934.5
Source: Japan Meteorological Agency

== Demographics ==
Per Japanese census data, the population of Miyakonojō in 2020 is 160,640 people. Miyakonojō has been conducting censuses since 1920.

Historical population

Year	Pop.	±%
1920	104,733	—
1925	115,475	+10.3%
1930	127,302	+10.2%
1935	132,880	+4.4%
1940	132,166	−0.5%
1945	165,910	+25.5%
1950	172,668	+4.1%
1955	179,587	+4.0%
1960	175,708	−2.2%
1965	166,237	−5.4%
1970	157,589	−5.2%

Year	Pop.	±%
1975	159,621	+1.3%
1980	172,655	+8.2%
1985	175,728	+1.8%
1990	172,593	−1.8%
1995	174,054	+0.8%
2000	171,812	−1.3%
2005	170,955	−0.5%
2010	169,633	−0.8%
2015	165,029	−2.7%
2020	160,640	−2.7%

Miyakonojō population statistics

== History ==
The area of Miyakonojō was part of ancient Hyūga Province. In 1026, near the end of the Heian period, it was site of the Shimazu Estate, the largest shōen (landed estate or manor) of medieval Japan. Expanded substantially in the first half of the 12th century, it eventually covered large portions of Satsuma, Ōsumi and Hyūga Provinces. In 1185, Koremune no Tadahisa was appointed as jitō of the estate, and adopted the name of the manor, thus founding the Shimazu clan. The area was ruled by the Hongō clan, a cadet branch of the Shimazu, in the Muromachi period, and with a kokudaka of 40,000 koku, was the largest of the autonomous territories within Satsuma Domain in the Edo period. Following the Meiji restoration, the town of Miyakonojō was established on May 1, 1889 with the creation of the modern municipalities system. It was elevated to city status on April 1, 1924.

On January 1, 2006, the towns of Takajō, Takazaki, Yamada and Yamanokuchi (all from Kitamorokata District) were merged into Miyakonojō.

== Government ==
Miyakonojō has a mayor-council form of government with a directly elected mayor and a unicameral city council of 29 members. Miyakonojō contributes six members to the Miyazaki Prefectural Assembly. In terms of national politics, the city is part of the Miyazaki 1st district of the lower house of the Diet of Japan.

== Economy ==
Many of Miyakonojō's citizens work as farmers. They produce gobō, meat, and bell peppers. Miyakonojō is also home to some agriculture-related manufacturing.

Miyakonojō is also famous for producing traditional Japanese archery bows from the abundant bamboo in the area.

== Education ==
Miyakonojō has 35 public elementary schools and 19 public junior high schools operated by the city government. The city has six public high schools operated by the Miyazaki Prefectural Board of Education. There are also two private high schools. The prefecture operates two special education schools for the handicapped.

== Transportation ==
=== Railways ===
JR Kyushu - Nippō Main Line

- Aoidake - Yamanokuchi - < Mochibaru - Mimata > - Miyakonojō - Nishi-Miyakonojō - Isoichi

JR Kyushu - Kitto Line

- Hyūga Maeda - Takasaki Shinden - Higashi Takasaki - Mangatsuka - Tanigashira - Hyūga Shōnai - Miyakonojō

=== Highways ===
- Miyazaki Expressway
- National Route 10
- National Route 221
- National Route 222
- National Route 223
- National Route 269

== Sister cities ==
- Jiangjin, Chongqing, China, friendship city since November 1999
- Ulaanbaatar, Mongolia, friendship city since November 1999

== Notable residents of Miyakonojō ==
- Hideo Higashikokubaru, a famous comedian and the former Governor of Miyazaki
- Kōsei Inoue, Olympic Gold Medalist in Judo
- Masatoshi Nagase, actor
- Gōgen Yamaguchi, known as "The Cat", was a renowned martial arts master of the Gōjū-ryū style of Karate
- Jūzō Yamasaki, a manga artist born in Miyakonojō
- Yuya Yanagi, a professional baseball player for the Chunichi Dragons
- Yuichi Yokoyama, manga artist

== Local attractions ==
- Imamachi Ichirizuka, National Historic Site
- Ōshima Hatakeda Site, National Historic Site
