= Ikomochi =

Japanese rice confection

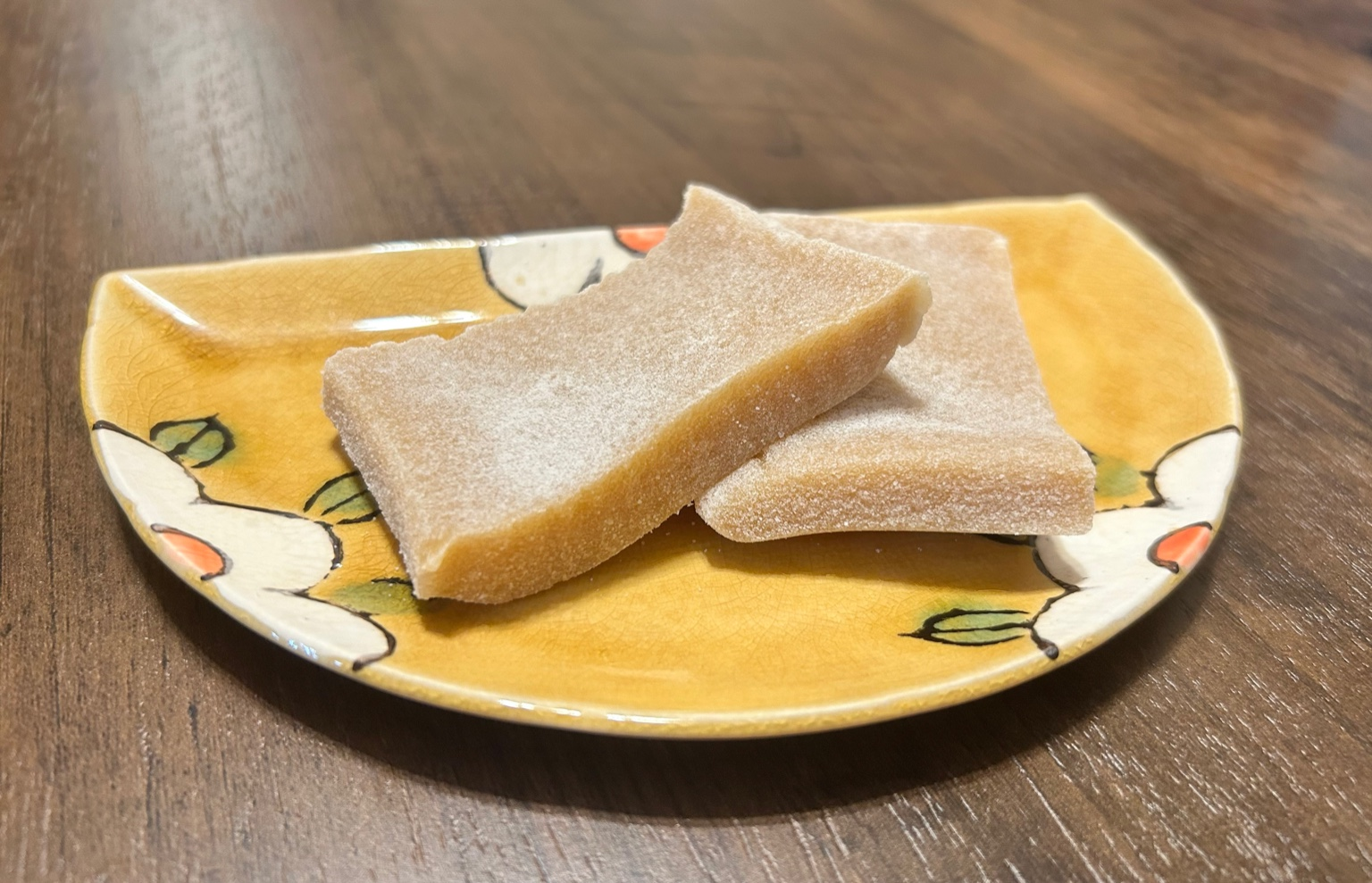
Ikomochi

Ikomochi (煎粉餅,いこもち) is a traditional Japanese confection made mainly in Kagoshima and Miyazaki Prefectures in Kyushu. It is a rice cake made by kneading roasted rice flour with hot sugar water. It is also called irikomochi(いりこもち).

== Overview ==
Ikomochi is a regional sweet of Kyushu made by kneading roasted rice flour ("iriko")—prepared from glutinous rice or non-glutinous rice—with sugar and starch syrup, then forming it into shape.

It has a pale yellow-brown appearance, a chewy texture, and a characteristic aroma and sweetness from the roasted rice. Potato starch or similar powders are sometimes dusted on the surface to prevent sticking.

More expensive versions may be nearly white in color.

== History ==
Ikomochi is said to have originated in the Satsuma Domain (now southern Miyazaki Prefecture and Kagoshima Prefecture) during the Edo period. It was particularly popular in places like Miyakonojo and Mimata in Miyazaki, and Soo in Kagoshima. In the past, it was traditionally made at home for festivals, the Bon Festival, or celebrations and was sometimes shared with neighbors.

Even today, ikomochi is commonly eaten in Kyushu households and is a standard souvenir sweet from southern Kyushu.

== Preparation ==
The type and ratio of sugars, the amount of water, and additional ingredients such as brown sugar, matcha, or sweet red bean paste vary by region and household. Ikomochi does not keep for long and is usually eaten fresh.

1. Glutinous rice or non-glutinous rice is roasted and ground to make "iriko" flour. The typical ratio is about 80% glutinous rice to 20% non-glutinous rice.
2. The iriko flour is kneaded well with sugar, starch syrup, and hot water.
3. The mixture is spread into a mold lined with potato starch.
4. Once cooled, it is cut into appropriate sizes.
