= Tarumizu =

Tarumizu 垂水市
- City
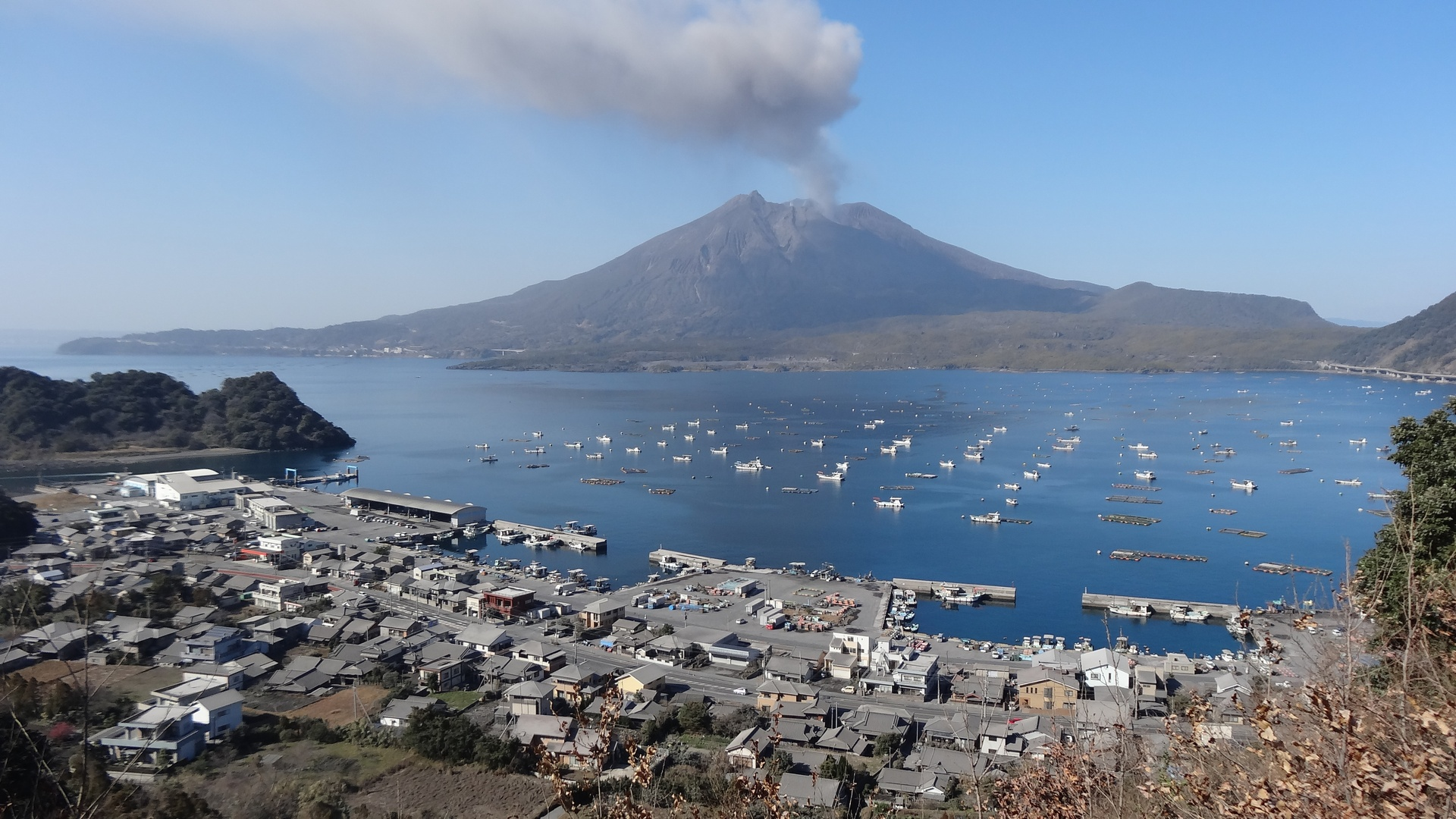
- Tarumizu City

- Flag Seal
- /0/queryThe property query is required; /0/idsThe property ids is required; /0Failed to match at least one schema; /0/titleThe property title is required; /0/serviceDoes not have a value in the enumeration ["page"]; /0Failed to match exactly one schema; /0/geometriesThe property geometries is required; /0/typeDoes not have a value in the enumeration ["GeometryCollection"]; /0/typeDoes not have a value in the enumeration ["MultiPolygon"]; /0/typeDoes not have a value in the enumeration ["Point"]; /0/typeDoes not have a value in the enumeration ["MultiPoint"]; /0/typeDoes not have a value in the enumeration ["LineString"]; /0/typeDoes not have a value in the enumeration ["MultiLineString"]; /0/typeDoes not have a value in the enumeration ["Polygon"]; /0/coordinatesThe property coordinates is required; /0/geometryThe property geometry is required; /0/typeDoes not have a value in the enumeration ["Feature"]; /0/featuresThe property features is required; /0/typeDoes not have a value in the enumeration ["FeatureCollection"]; Location of Tarumizu in Kagoshima Prefecture

- Location in Japan
- Coordinates: 31°29′34″N 130°42′03″E
- Country: Japan
- Region: Kyushu
- Prefecture: Kagoshima

Area
  - Total: 162.10 km^{2} (62.59 sq mi)

Population (May 1, 2024)
  - Total: 13,114
  - Density: 80.901/km^{2} (209.53/sq mi)
- Time zone: UTC+09:00 (JST)
- City hall address: 114 Kamimachi, Tarumizu-shi, Kagoshima-ken 891-2192
- Website: Official website
- Symbols
- Flower: Azalea
- Tree: Pine

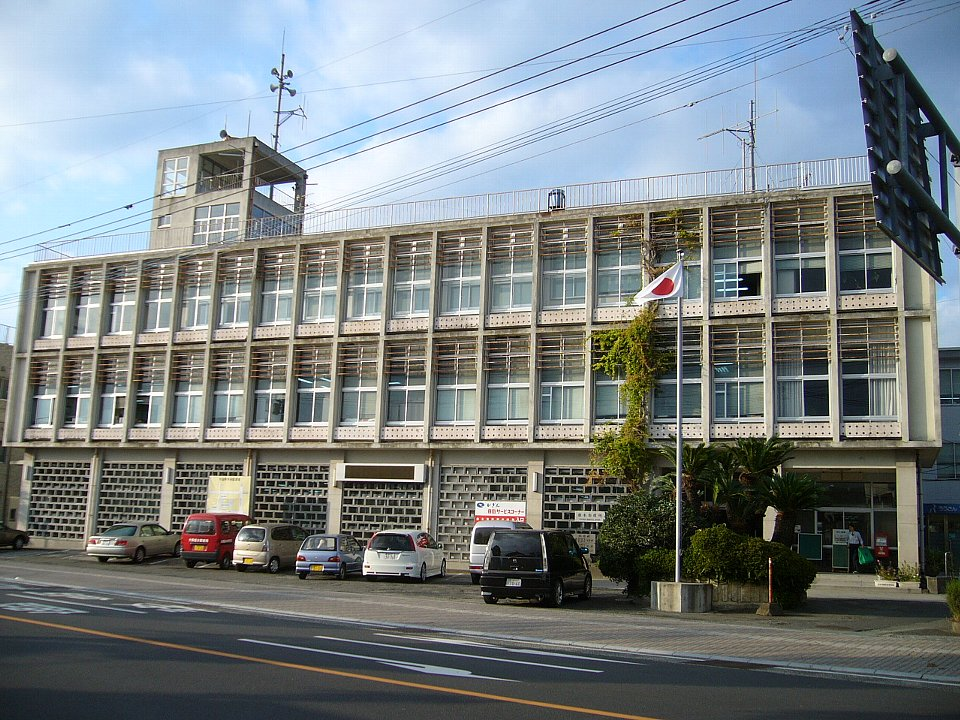
Tarumizu City office

Tarumizu (垂水市, Tarumizu-shi) is a city located in Kagoshima Prefecture, Japan. The city was founded on October 1, 1958. As of 1 May 2024, the city had an estimated population of 13,114 in 7236 households, and a population density of 81 persons per km². The total area of the city is 162.10 km^{2} (62.59 sq mi).>

== Geography ==
Tarumizu is located in the northwest of the Ōsumi Peninsula, facing Kagoshima Bay and Kagoshima City to the east. The city center is developed on low-lying land along the coast, and the inland area to the east of the city area consists of Shirasu Plateau and mountains. Sakurajima, which was once an island, became connected to Tarumizu after the Great Taisho eruption of Sakurajima in 1914, but is administratively part of Kagoshima city and not Tarumizu.

=== Neighboring municipalities ===
Kagoshima Prefecture

- Kagoshima
- Kanoya
- Kirishima

=== Climate ===
Tarumizu has a humid subtropical climate (Köppen Cfa) characterized by warm summers and cool winters with light to no snowfall. The average annual temperature in Tarumizu is 16.3 °C. The average annual rainfall is 2260 mm with September as the wettest month. The temperatures are highest on average in August, at around 25.9 °C, and lowest in January, at around 6.3 °C.

=== Demographics ===
Per Japanese census data, the population of Tarumizu is as shown below:

Historical population
| Year | Pop. | ±% |
|---|---|---|
| 1920 | 26,245 | — |
| 1930 | 29,406 | +12.0% |
| 1940 | 29,319 | −0.3% |
| 1950 | 38,185 | +30.2% |
| 1960 | 32,721 | −14.3% |
| 1970 | 25,952 | −20.7% |
| 1980 | 24,179 | −6.8% |
| 1990 | 22,264 | −7.9% |
| 2000 | 20,107 | −9.7% |
| 2010 | 17,248 | −14.2% |
| 2020 | 13,819 | −19.9% |

== History ==
The area of Tarumizu was part of ancient Ōsumi Province, and was part of the holding of Satsuma Domain in the Edo period. After the Meiji restoration, the village of Tarumizu was established with the creation of the modern municipalities system on April 1, 1889. Tarumizu was raised to town status on April 1, 1924 and to city status on October 1, 1958.

In February 1944, the Tarumizu Maru, a passenger ferry, set sail for Kagoshima and capsized within minutes. 466 passengers were reported dead.

== Government ==
Tarumizu has a mayor-council form of government with a directly elected mayor and a unicameral city council of 14 members. Tarumizu, collectively with the city of Kanoya contributes four members to the Kagoshima Prefectural Assembly. In terms of national politics, the city is part of the Kagoshima 4th district of the lower house of the Diet of Japan.

== Economy ==
Tarumizu has a primary economy centering on agriculture, fishing, livestock raising and food processing.

== Education ==
Tarumizu has eight public elementary schools and one public junior high school operated by the city government and one public high school operated by the Kagoshima Prefectural Board of Education. There is also one private high school. The city also hosts Nagoya University's Solar-Terrestrial Environment Laboratory.

== Transportation ==
=== Railway ===
Tarumizu has been without passenger rail services, after the closure of the Ōsumi Line in 1987. The nearest station is Kagoshima-Chūō Station on the Kyushu Shinkansen.

=== Highway ===
- National Route 220
- National Route 224
