= Japan National Route 224 =

Road in Kagoshima prefecture, Japan

National Route 224
- 国道224号
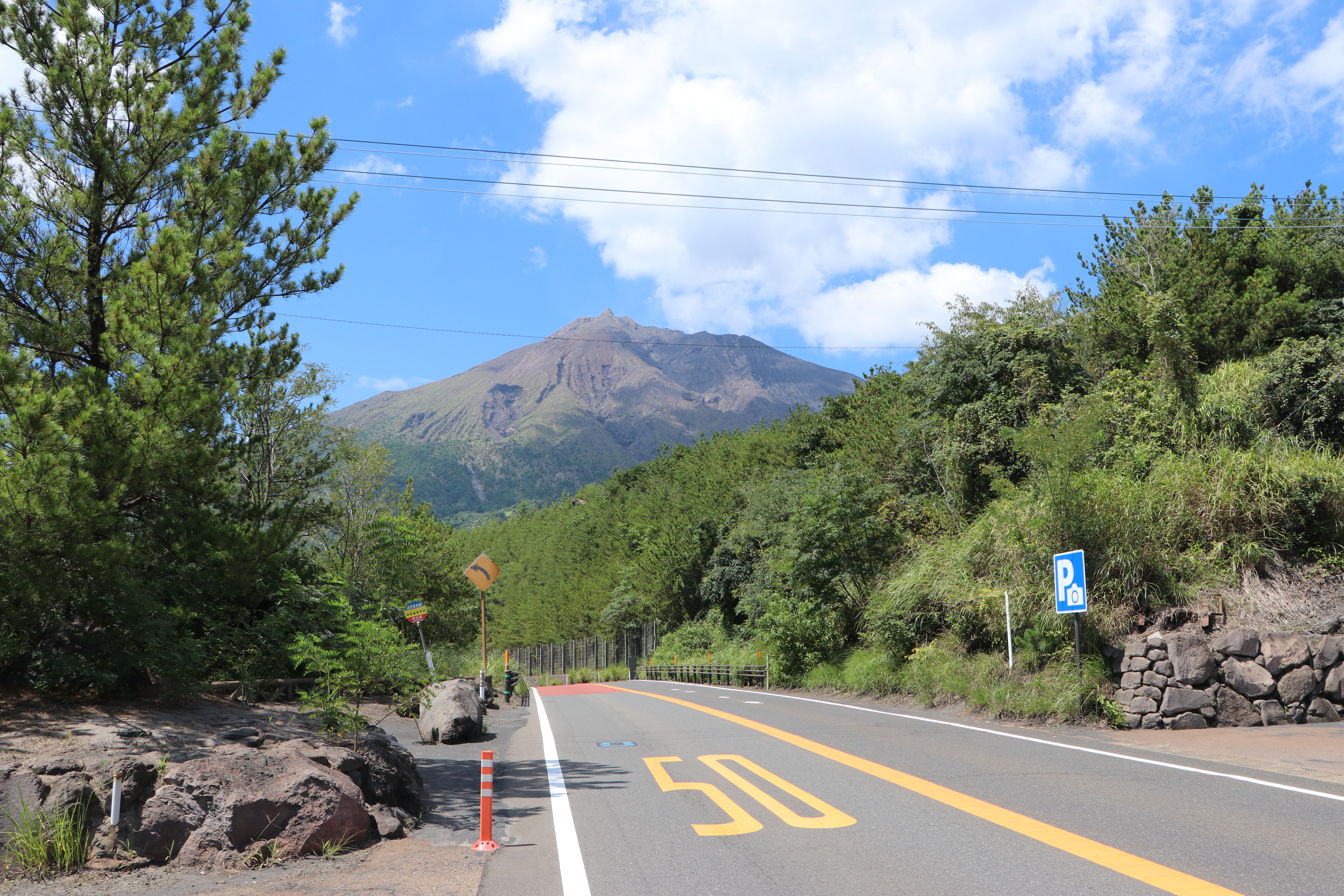
- Route 224 with Sakurajima

Route information
- Length: 14.2 km (8.8 mi)

Major junctions
- West end: Kagoshima, Kagoshima
- East end: National Route 220 near Tarumizu, Kagoshima

Location
- Country: Japan

Highway system
- National highways of Japan; Expressways of Japan
| ← National Route 223 | → National Route 225 |

National Route 224 is a national highway of Japan connecting Tarumizu, Kagoshima and Kagoshima, Kagoshima (via Sakurajima) in Japan, 14.2 km (8.82 mi) in length.
