= Japan National Route 222 =

National highway in Japan

National Route 222
- 国道222号
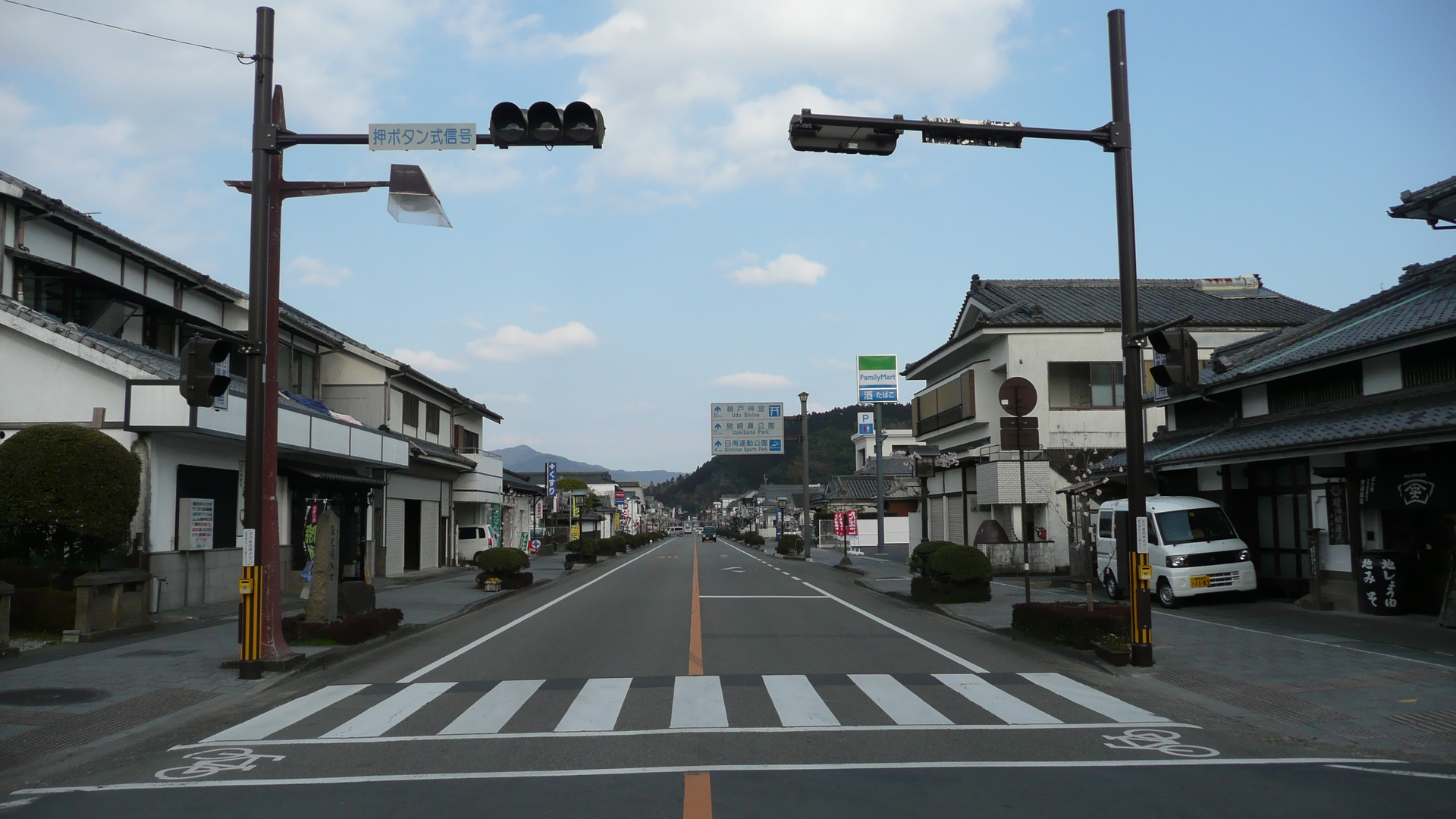

Route information
- Length: 55.2 km (34.3 mi)
- Existed: 18 May 1953–present

Major junctions
- West end: National Route 10 in Miyakonojō
- East end: National Route 220 in Nichinan

Location
- Country: Japan

Highway system
- National highways of Japan; Expressways of Japan
← National Route 221	→ National Route 223

National Route 222 is a national highway of Japan connecting Nichinan and Miyakonojō in Japan, with a total length of 55.2 km (34.3 mi).
