= Toshiharu =

- Pronunciation: toɕihaɾɯ (IPA)
- Gender: Male

Origin
- Origin: Japanese
- Meaning: Different meanings depending on the kanji used

Other names
- Alternative spelling: Tosiharu (Kunrei-shiki) Tosiharu (Nihon-shiki) Toshiharu (Hepburn)

Toshiharu is a masculine Japanese given name.

== Written forms ==
Toshiharu can be written using different combinations of kanji characters. Some examples:

- 敏治, "agile, to manage"
- 敏春, "agile, spring"
- 敏温, "agile, warm up"
- 敏晴, "agile, clear (weather)"
- 俊治, "talented, to manage"
- 俊春, "talented, spring"
- 俊温, "talented, warm up"
- 俊晴, "talented, clear (weather)"
- 利治, "benefit, to manage"
- 利春, "benefit, spring"
- 利温, "benefit, warm up"
- 利晴, "benefit, clear (weather)"
- 年治, "year, to manage"
- 年春, "year, spring"
- 寿治, "long life, to manage"
- 寿春, "long life, spring"

The name can also be written in hiragana としはる or katakana トシハル.

== Notable people with the name ==
- Toshiharu Furukawa (古川 俊治, born 1963), Japanese medical doctor, attorney, and politician of the Liberal Democratic Party.
- Toshiharu Ikeda (池田 敏春, 1951 – 2010), Japanese film director and screenwriter.
- Toshiharu Kokubun (國分 利治, born 1958), CEO and founder of Earth Holdings.
- Toshiharu Sakurai (桜井 敏治, born 1964), Japanese voice actor.
- Toshiharu Todoroki (轟木 利治, born 1960), Japanese politician of the Democratic Party of Japan.

== Fictional characters ==
- Toshiharu Shibahime (芝姫 俊春), from manga and anime Kareshi Kanojo no Jijo.

== See also ==
- 10319 Toshiharu, main-belt asteroid
