= Takazaki =

Takazaki may refer to:

- Takazaki, Miyazaki, a former town in Kitamorokata District, Miyazaki Prefecture, Japan
- Issei Takazaki (髙﨑 一生, born 1987), Japanese shogi player
