= Takajo, Miyazaki =

Dissolved municipality in Miyazaki prefecture, Japan

Takajō (高城町, Takajō-chō) was a town located in Kitamorokata District, Miyazaki Prefecture, Japan.

As of 2003, the town had an estimated population of 12,092 and the density of 128.35 persons per km^{2}. The total area was 94.21 km^{2}.

On January 1, 2006, Takajō, along with the towns of Takazaki, Yamada and Yamanokuchi (all from Kitamorokata District), was merged into the expanded city of Miyakonojō and no longer exists as an independent municipality.
