= Kitamorokata District, Miyazaki =

District in Miyazaki prefecture, Japan

Coordinates: 31.722°N 131.173°E

Kitamorokata District in Miyazaki Prefecture

Kitamorokata (北諸県郡, Kitamorokata-gun) is a district located in Miyazaki Prefecture, Japan.

As of the Miyakonojō merger (but with the population statistics as of October 2020), the district has an estimated population of 25,591 and a density of 232.6 persons per km^{2}. The total area is 110.0 km^{2}.

== Towns and villages ==
- Mimata

== Mergers ==
- On January 1, 2006 the towns of Takajō, Takazaki, Yamada, and Yamanokuchi merged into the expanded city of Miyakonojō.
