= Yamanokuchi Station =

Railway station in Miyakonojō, Miyazaki Prefecture, Japan

Yamanokuchi Station 山之口駅
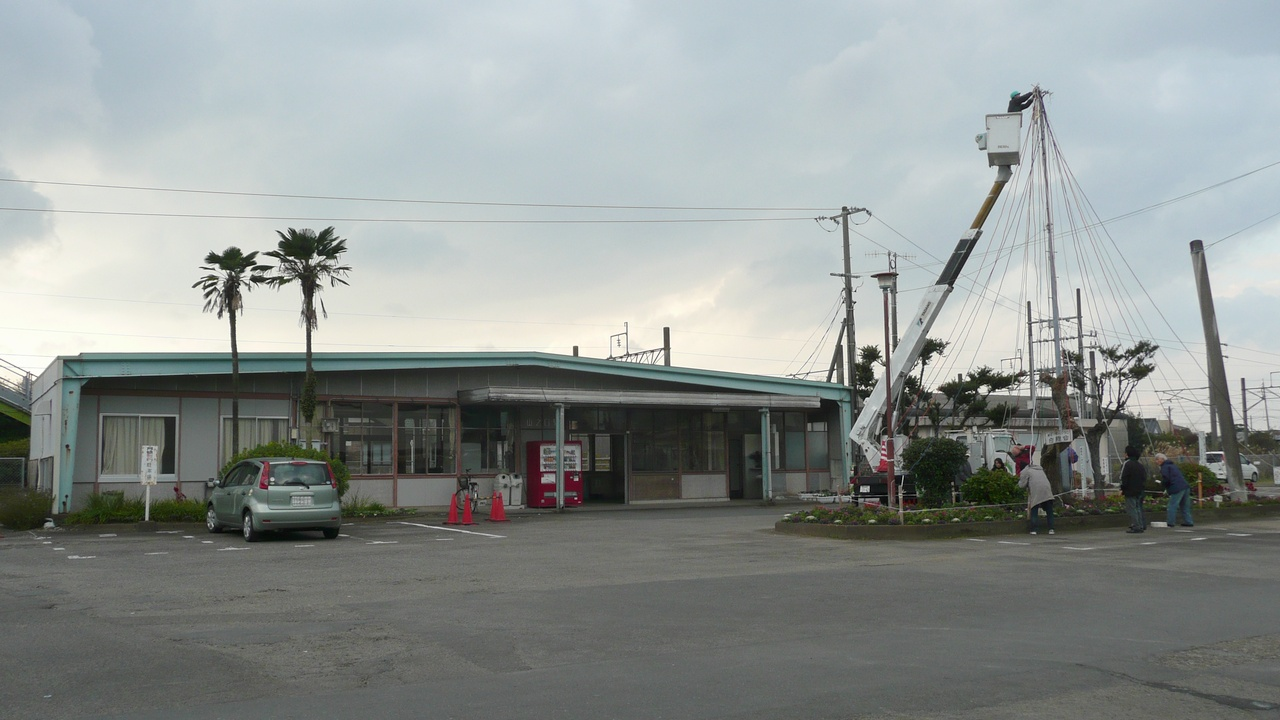
- Yamanokuchi Station in 2008

General information
- Location: Yamanokuchicho Hananoki, Miyakonojo-shi, Miyazaki-ken 889-1802; Japan
- Coordinates: 31°46′58″N 131°09′11″E
- Operator: JR Kyushu
- Line: ■ Nippō Main Line
- Distance: 379.1 km from Kokura
- Platforms: 1 island platform
- Tracks: 2

Construction
- Structure type: At grade
- Accessible: No - platform accessed by footbridge

Other information
- Status: Unstaffed
- Website: Official website

History
- Opened: 15 August 1914

Passengers
- FY2016: 194 daily

Services
Preceding station	JR Kyushu	Following station
Mochibaru towards Kagoshima	Nippō Main Line	Aoidake towards Kokura
Location
- Location within Miyazaki Prefecture Location within Japan

Yamanokuchi Station (山之口駅, Yamanokuchi-eki) is a passenger railway station located in the city of Miyakonojō, Miyazaki, Japan. It is operated by JR Kyushu.

== Lines ==
The station is served by the Nippō Main Line and is located 379.1 km from the starting point of the line at Kokura.

== Layout ==
The station, which is unstaffed, consists of an island platform serving two tracks. The station building is a modern steel frame structure which houses a waiting area and an automatic ticket vending machine. Access to the island platform is by means of a footbridge.

=== Platforms ===
1	■ ■ Nippō Main Line	for Miyakonojō and Kagoshima-Chūō
2	■ ■ Nippō Main Line	for Minami-Miyazaki and Miyazaki

== History ==
Japanese Government Railways (JGR) had opened the Miyazaki Line from Yoshimatsu to Miyakonojō on 8 October 1913. The track was extended east in phases, with Yamanokuchi opening as the new terminus on 15 August 1914. It became a through-station on 21 March 1916 when the track was extended to Aoidake. By 21 September 1917, the track had reached Miyazaki and line was renamed the Miyazaki Main Line. By 1923, the track had reached north to link up with the track of the Nippō Main Line at Shigeoka. On 15 December 1923, Yamanokuchi was designated as part of the Nippō Main Line together with the entire stretch through Miyazaki to Yoshimatsu. Freight services were discontinued in 1971 and baggage handling in 1984. With the privatization of Japanese National Railways (JNR), the successor of JGR, on 1 April 1987, the station came under the control of JR Kyushu.

== Passenger statistics ==
In fiscal 2016, the station was used by an average of 194 passengers (boarding only) per day.

== Surrounding area ==
- Miyakonojo City Hall Yamanokuchi General Branch (formerly Yamanokuchi Town Hall)
- Miyakonojo City Yamanoguchi Elementary School
- Japan National Route 269

== See also ==
- List of railway stations in Japan
