= Mimata, Miyazaki =

Mimata 三股町
- Town
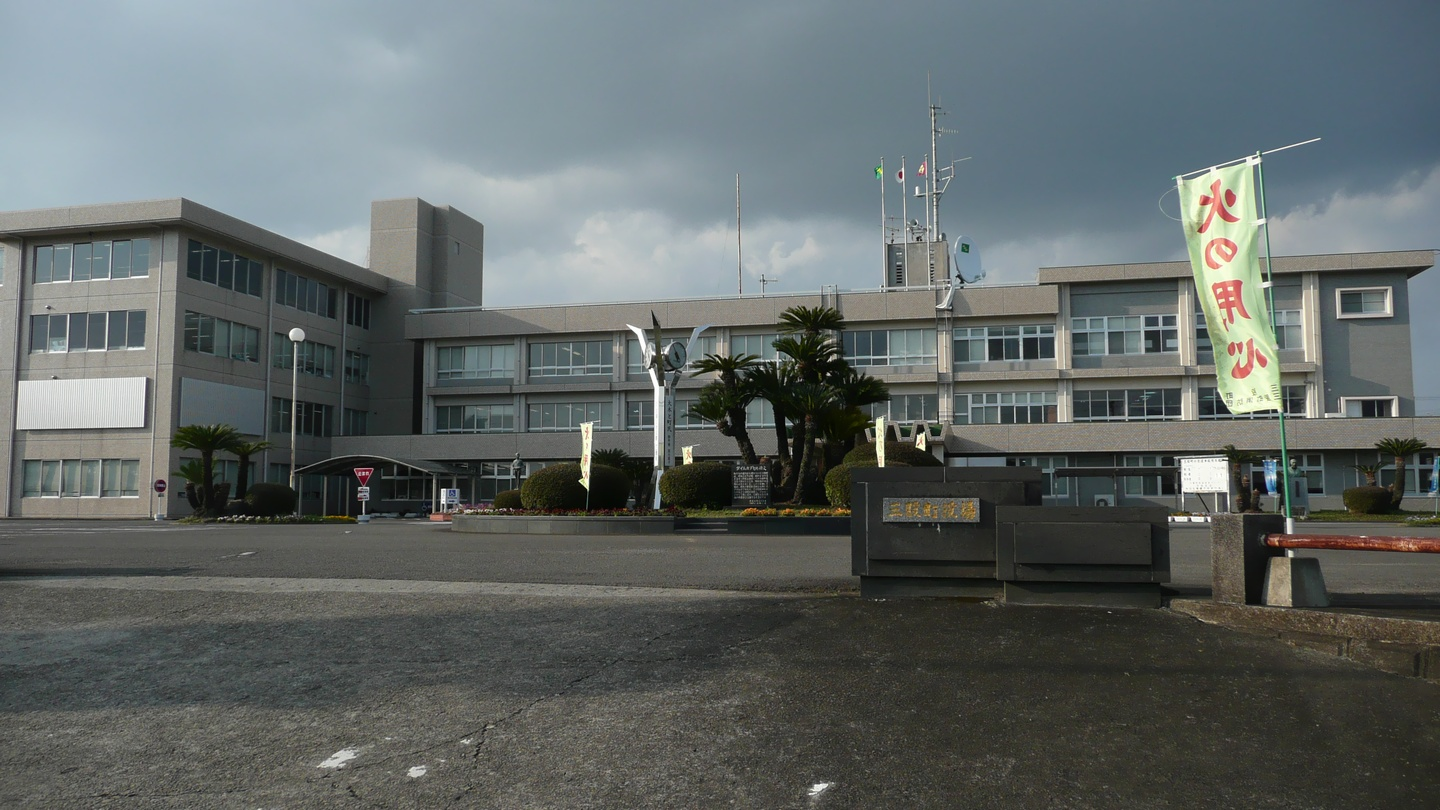
- Mimata Town Office

- Flag Chapter
- Interactive map of Mimata
- Location in Japan
- Coordinates: 31°43′50″N 131°7′30″E
- Country: Japan
- Region: Kyushu
- Prefecture: Miyazaki
- District: Kitamorokata

Area
  - Total: 110.02 km^{2} (42.48 sq mi)

Population (November 1, 2023)
  - Total: 25,455
  - Density: 231.37/km^{2} (599.24/sq mi)
- Time zone: UTC+09:00 (JST)
- City hall address: 1-1 Gohonmatsu, Mimata-cho, Kitamoroken-gun, Miyazaki-ken 889-1995
- Website: Official website
- Symbols
- Bird: Bunting
- Flower: Azalea
- Tree: Ginkgo Biloba

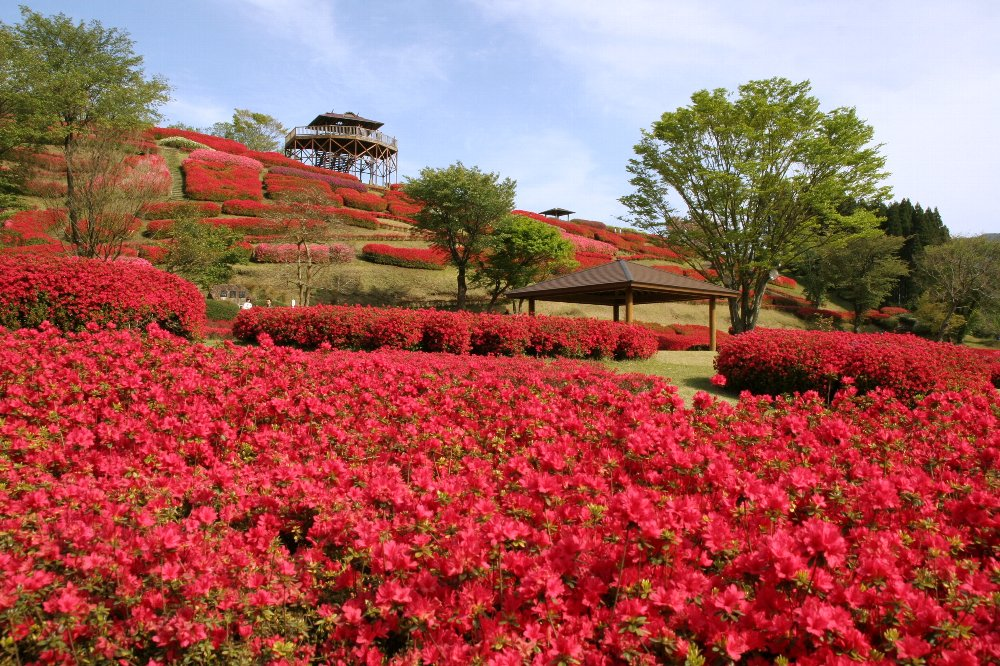
Shiibae Park

Mimata (三股町, Mimata-chō) is a town located in Kitamorokata District, Miyazaki Prefecture, Japan. As of 1 November 2023, the town had an estimated population of 25,455 in 10394 households, and a population density of 230 persons per km^{2}. The total area of the town is 110.02 km^{2} (42.48 sq mi). In October 2022, it was ranked as the best town to live in Miyazaki Prefecture.

== Geography ==
The west side of the town area is the Miyakonojō Basin, and the east side is the Wanizuka Mountains. Wanizukayama, the highest peak in the Wanizuka Mountains, is located to the northeast of the town area. The urban area is integrated with Miyakonojō City, which is adjacent to the west.

=== Neighbouring municipalities ===
Miyazaki Prefecture

- Miyakonojō
- Miyazaki
- Nichinan

=== Climate ===
Mimata has a humid subtropical climate (Köppen Cfa) characterized by warm summers and cool winters with light to no snowfall. The average annual temperature in Mimata is 15.4 °C. The average annual rainfall is 2295 mm with September as the wettest month. The temperatures are highest on average in August, at around 25.0 °C, and lowest in January, at around 5.2 °C.

== Demographics ==
Per Japanese census data the population of Mimata is as follows:

Historical population
Year	Pop.	±%
1950	12,436	—
1960	16,663	+34.0%
1970	15,249	−8.5%
1980	14,699	−3.6%
1990	17,713	+20.5%
2000	21,011	+18.6%
2010	24,056	+14.5%
2020	24,811	+3.1%

== History ==
The area of Mimata was part of ancient Hyūga Province, and during the Edo period was completely within the borders of Satsuma Domain. In 1871, with the abolition of the han system, the area was incorporated into Kagoshima Prefecture, but was later transferred to Miyazaki Prefecture. The village of Mimata within Kitamorokata District, Miyazaki was established on May 1, 1889 with the creation of the modern municipalities system. Mimata was raised to town status on May 2, 1948.

== Government ==
Mimata has a mayor-council form of government with a directly elected mayor and a unicameral town council of 12 members. Mimata contributes one member to the Miyazaki Prefectural Assembly. In terms of national politics, the town is part of the Miyazaki 1st district of the lower house of the Diet of Japan.

== Economy ==
The local economy is centered on agriculture.

== Education ==
Mimata has six public elementary schools and one public junior high school operated by the town. The town has one private high school.

== Transportation ==
=== Railways ===
JR Kyushu - Nippō Main Line

- Mochibaru - Mimata

=== Highways ===
Mimata is not on any national highway or expressway. The main local road, Miyakonojō-Hokugō Line (Miyazaki Prefectural Route 33), runs through the town, connecting Miyakonojō City and Nichinan City. From the town center, the main regional road Miyakonojō Higashi-Kanjō Line (Miyazaki Prefectural Route 12) branches off to the south, and the Mimata Takagi Line (Miyazaki Prefectural Route 47) branches to the north, each of which connects to Japan National Route 269 within Miyakonojō City.

== Local attractions ==
- Kajiyama Bridge (梶山橋) is located in the center of a local park. It was built in 1942. It is located 4 km from the JR Mimata Station. It is nicknamed Megane Bridge (メガネ橋) which means "glasses bridge". This is because it looks like a pair of eyeglasses when it is reflected in the water.
- Nagata Gorge (長田峡) is located only 8 km from the JR Mimata Station. It is approximately 10 minutes by car.
- Shiibae Park (椎八重公園) is famous for its Azalea Festival. This happens in April of every year during the Hanami season. Shiibae is located only 12 km from the JR Mimata Station.

== Noted people from Mimata ==
- Matsuko Mawatari, singer, songwriter
- Toshiharu Todoroki, politician
