= Mimata Station =

Railway station in Mimata, Miyazaki Prefecture, Japan

Mimata Station 三股駅
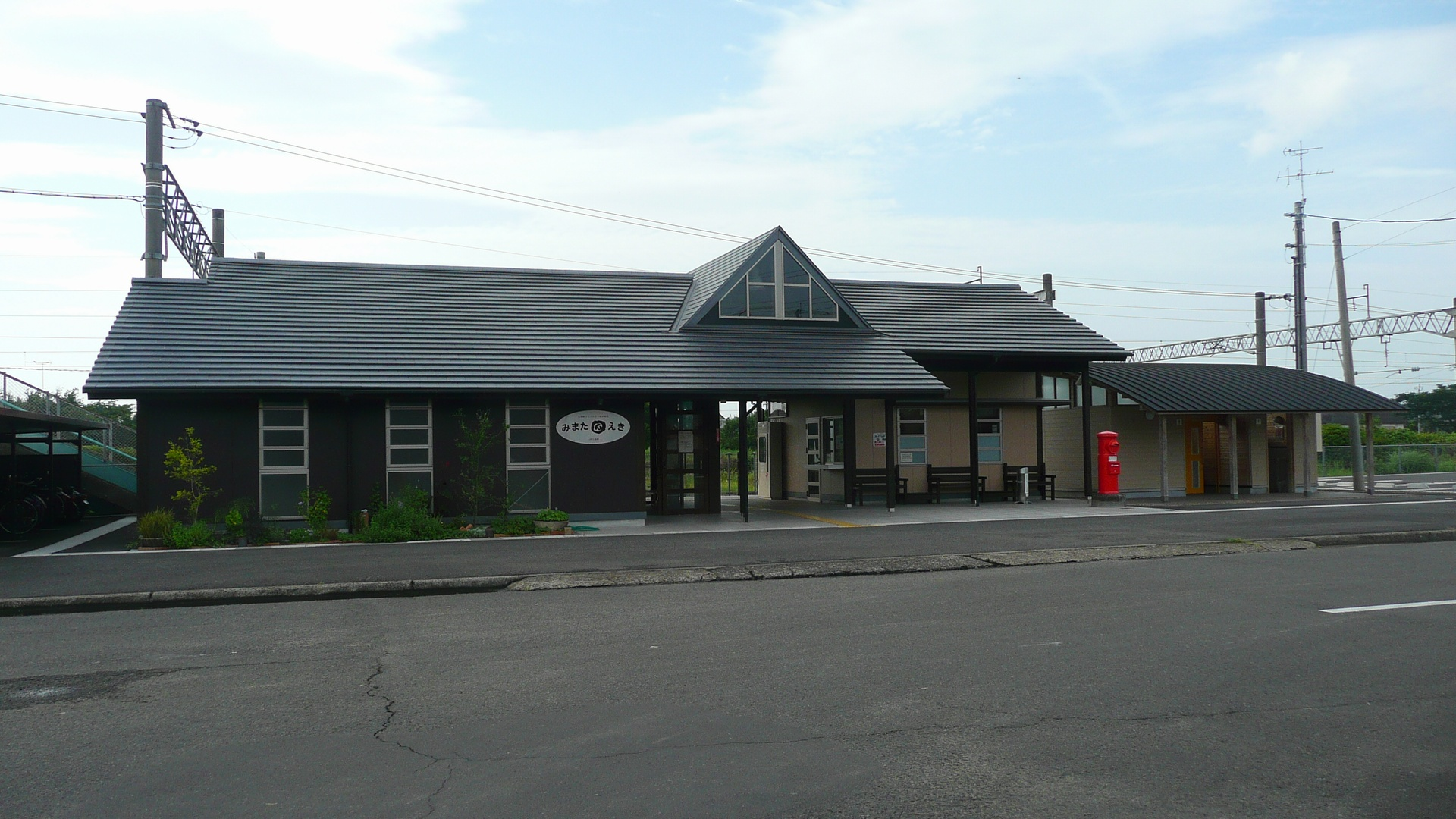
- Mimata Station in 2009

General information
- Location: Kabayama, Mimata-shi, Kitamorokata-gun, Miyazaki-ken 889-1901; Japan
- Coordinates: 31°44′02″N 131°07′11″E
- Operator: JR Kyushu
- Line: ■ Nippō Main Line
- Distance: 385.6 km from Kokura
- Platforms: 1 island platform
- Tracks: 2

Construction
- Structure type: At grade
- Accessible: No - platform accessed by footbridge

Other information
- Status: Unstaffed
- Website: Official website

History
- Opened: 11 February 1914
- Former names: Renamed Higashi-Miyakonojō (15 March 1972); Reverted to Mimata (3 March 1986)

Passengers
- FY2016: 260 daily

Services
Preceding station	JR Kyushu	Following station
Miyakonojō towards Kagoshima	Nippō Main Line	Mochibaru towards Kokura
Location
- Location within Miyazaki Prefecture Location within Japan

Mimata Station (三股駅, Mimata-eki) is a passenger railway station located in the town of Mimata, Miyazaki, Japan. It is operated by JR Kyushu and is on the Nippō Main Line.

== Lines ==
The station is served by the Nippō Main Line and is located 385.6 km from the starting point of the line at Kokura.

== Layout ==
The station consists of an island platform serving two tracks. The station building is a wooden structure remodelled recently in western style. It houses an enclosed waiting room and an automatic ticket vending machine. The ticket window is unstaffed. Access to the island platform is by means of a footbridge.

=== Platforms ===
1	■ ■ Nippō Main Line	for Miyakonojō and Kagoshima-Chūō
2	■ ■ Nippō Main Line	for Minami-Miyazaki and Miyazaki

== History ==
Japanese Government Railways (JGR) had opened the Miyazaki Line from Yoshimatsu to Miyakonojō on 8 October 1913. In the next phase of expansion, the track was extended east, with Mimata opening as the new terminus on 11 February 1914. On 15 August the same year, it became a through-station when the track was extended to Yamanokuchi. By 21 September 1917, the track had reached Miyazaki and line was renamed the Miyazaki Main Line. By 1923, the track had reached north to link up with the track of the Nippō Main Line at Shigeoka. On 15 December 1923, Mimata was designated as part of the Nippō Main Line together with the entire stretch through Miyazaki, Miyakonojō to Yoshimatsu. Freight operations were discontinued in 1984. With the privatization of Japanese National Railways (JNR), the successor of JGR, on 1 April 1987, the station came under the control of JR Kyushu.

== Passenger statistics ==
In fiscal 2016, the station was used by an average of 260 passengers (boarding only) per day.

== See also ==
- List of railway stations in Japan

== Surrounding area ==
- Mimata Town Hall
- Mimata Municipal Mimata Elementary School
