= Yamanokuchi, Miyazaki =

Dissolved municipality in Miyazaki prefecture, Japan

Coordinates: 31.800°N 131.167°E

Yamanokuchi (山之口町, Yamanokuchi-chō) was a town located in Kitamorokata District, Miyazaki Prefecture, Japan.

As of 2003, the town had an estimated population of 7,119 and the density of 73.02 persons per km^{2}. The total area was 97.50 km^{2}.

On January 1, 2006, Yamanokuchi, along with the towns of Takajō, Takazaki and Yamada (all from Kitamorokata District), was merged into the expanded city of Miyakonojō and no longer exists as an independent municipality.
