= Yamada, Miyazaki =

Dissolved municipality in Miyazaki prefecture, Japan

Yamada (山田町, Yamada-chō) was a town located in Kitamorokata District, Miyazaki Prefecture, Japan.

As of 2003, the town had an estimated population of 8,420 and the density of 135.37 persons per km^{2}. The total area was 62.20 km^{2}.

On January 1, 2006, Yamada, along with the towns of Takajō, Takazaki and Yamanokuchi (all from Kitamorokata District), was merged into the expanded city of Miyakonojō and no longer exists as an independent municipality.
