= Mochibaru Station =

Railway station in Mimata, Miyazaki Prefecture, Japan

Mochibaru Station 餅原駅
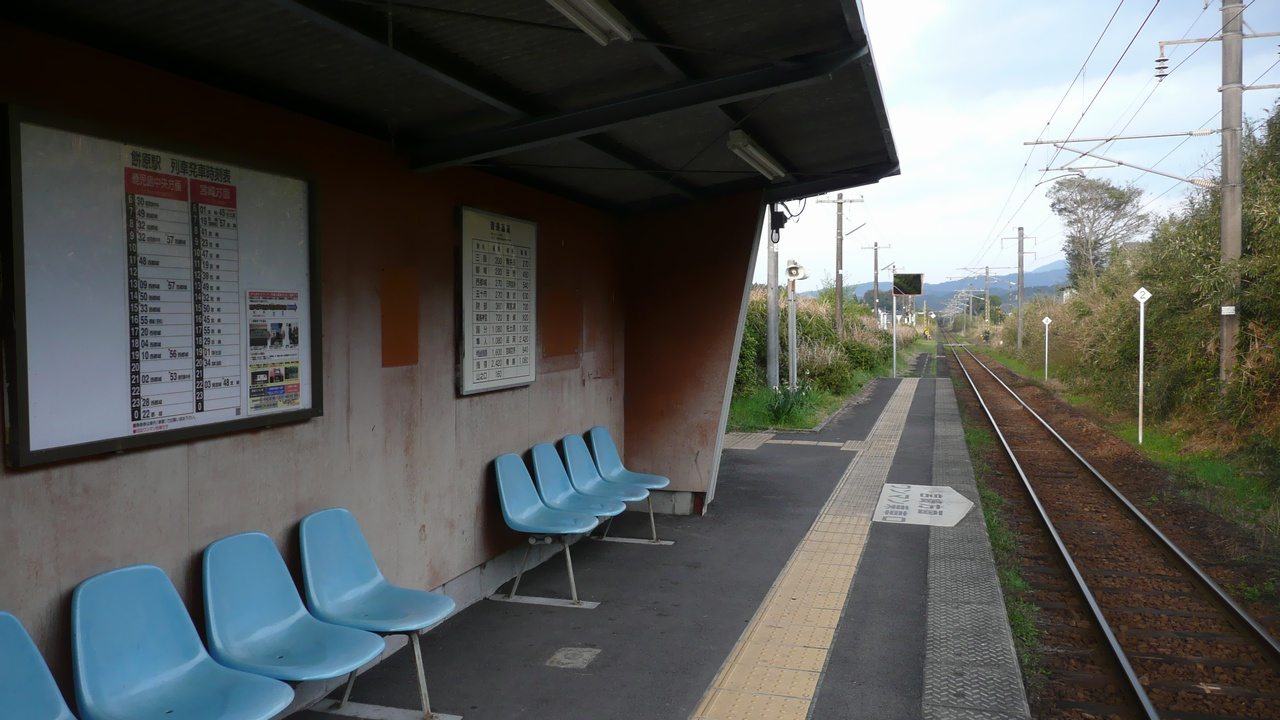
- Mochibaru Station platform in 2009

General information
- Location: Mochibaru, Mimata-sho, Kitamorokata-gun, Miyazaki-ken 889-1913; Japan
- Coordinates: 31°45′25″N 131°07′58″E
- Operator: JR Kyushu
- Line: ■ Nippō Main Line
- Distance: 382.0 km from Kokura
- Platforms: 1 side platform
- Tracks: 1

Construction
- Structure type: Cutting
- Cycle facilities: Bike shed
- Accessible: No - steps down to platform

Other information
- Status: Unstaffed
- Website: Official website

History
- Opened: 1 April 1965

Passengers
- FY2016: 24 daily

Services
Preceding station	JR Kyushu	Following station
Mimata towards Kagoshima	Nippō Main Line	Yamanokuchi towards Kokura
Location
- Location within Miyazaki Prefecture Location within Japan

Mochibaru Station (餅原駅, Mochibaru-eki) is a passenger railway station located in the town of Mimata, Miyazaki, Japan. It is operated by JR Kyushu.

== Lines ==
The station is served by the Nippō Main Line and is located 382.0 km from the starting point of the line at Kokura.

== Layout ==
The station consists of a side platform serving a single track in a shallow cutting. There is no station building. From the access road, a flight of steps (indicated by a signboard) leads down directly to the platform where a shelter is provided. A bike shed and toilet are located on the access road opposite the station entrance.

== History ==
Japanese National Railways (JNR) opened the station on 1 April 1965 as an additional station on the existing track of the Nippō Main Line. With the privatization of JNR on 1 April 1987, the station came under the control of JR Kyushu.

== Passenger statistics ==
In fiscal 2016, the station was used by an average of 24 passengers (boarding only) per day.

== Surrounding area ==
- Kakure-Nenbutsu-do

== See also ==
- List of railway stations in Japan
