= Takazaki, Miyazaki =

Dissolved municipality in Miyazaki prefecture, Japan

Takazaki (高崎町, Takazaki-chō) was a town located in Kitamorokata District, Miyazaki Prefecture, Japan.

As of 2003, the town had an estimated population of 10,956 and the density of 117.57 persons per km^{2}. The total area was 93.19 km^{2}.

On January 1, 2006, Takazaki, along with the towns of Takajō, Yamada and Yamanokuchi (all from Kitamorokata District), was merged into the expanded city of Miyakonojō and no longer exists as an independent municipality.
