= Japan National Route 223 =

Road in Japan

National Route 223
- 国道223号
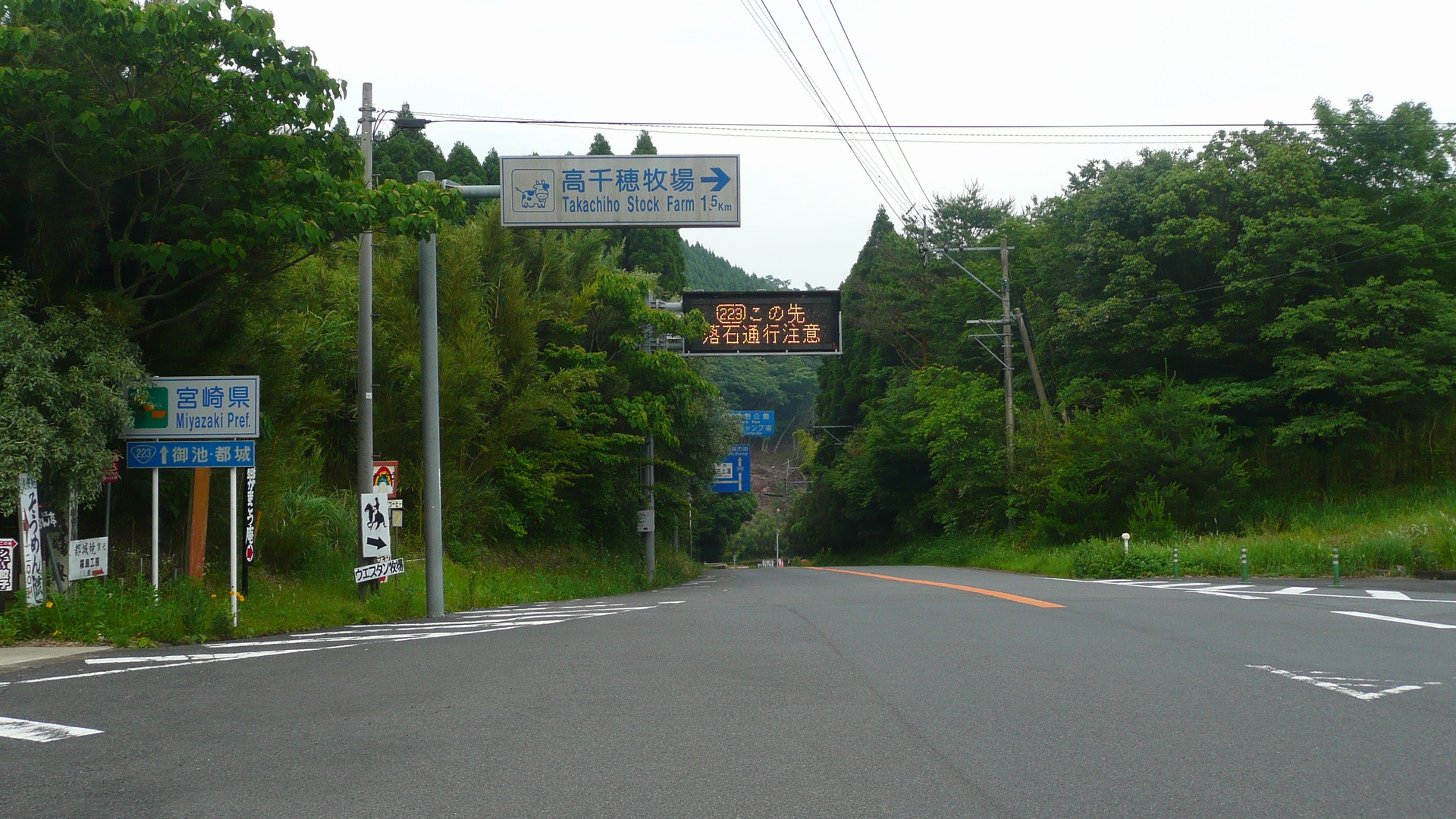

Route information
- Length: 72.5 km (45.0 mi)

Location
- Country: Japan

Highway system
- National highways of Japan; Expressways of Japan
← National Route 222	→ National Route 224

National Route 223 is a national highway of Japan connecting Kobayashi, Miyazaki, and Kirishima, Kagoshima, in Japan, with a total length of 72.5 km (45.0 mi).
