= Japan National Route 221 =

Japanese road from Hitoyoshi to Miyakonojō

National Route 221
- 国道221号
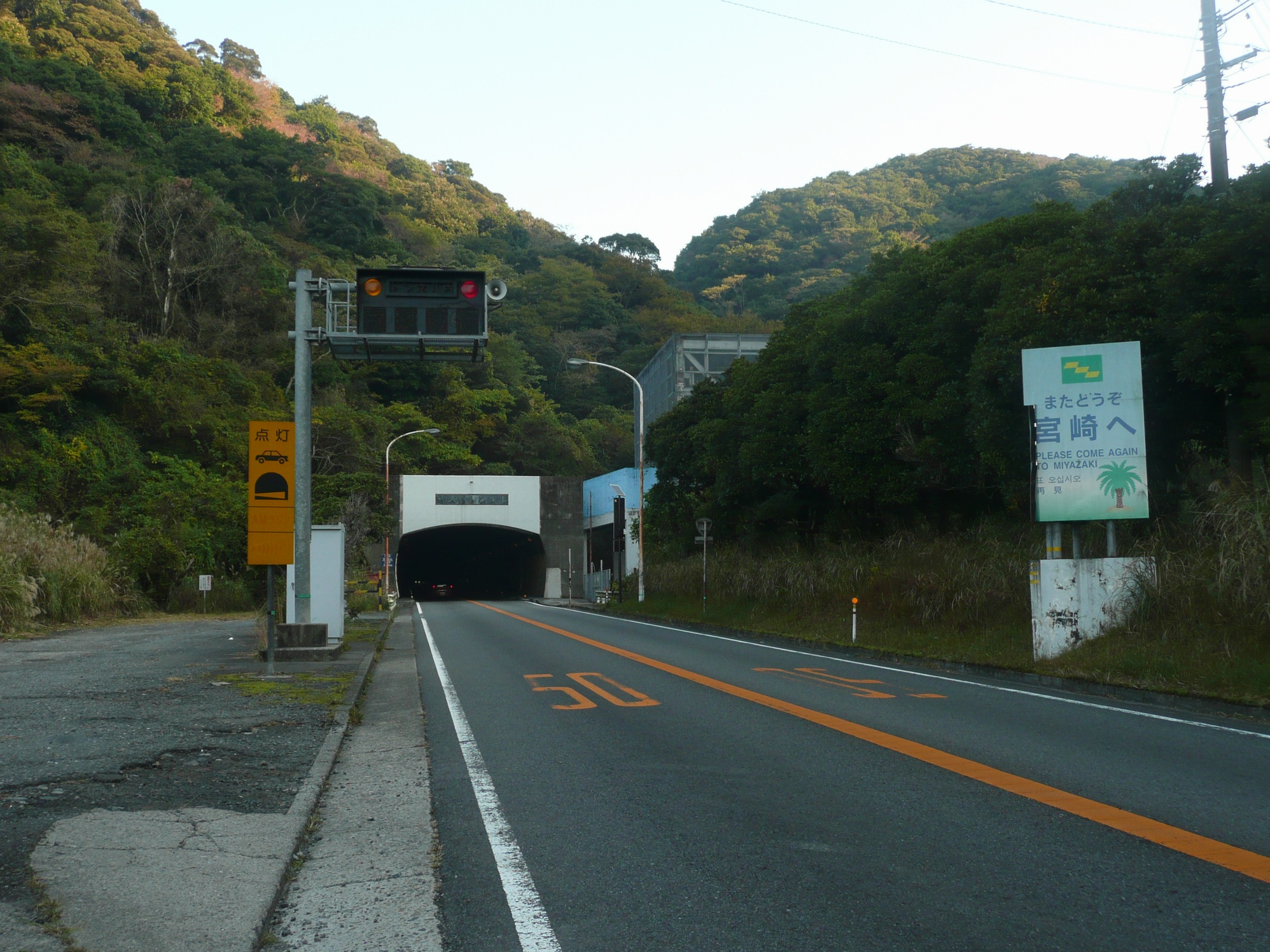

Route information
- Length: 74.6 km (46.4 mi)
- Existed: 18 May 1953–present

Major junctions
- North end: National Route 219 in Hitoyoshi
- South end: National Route 10 in Miyakonojō

Location
- Country: Japan

Highway system
- National highways of Japan; Expressways of Japan
← National Route 220	→ National Route 222

National Route 221 is a national highway of Japan connecting Hitoyoshi and Miyakonojō in Japan, with a total length of 74.6 km (46.4 mi).
