= Toshiharu Todoroki =

Japanese politician

- 轟木 利治

Member of the House of Councillors
- In office 29 July 2007 – 28 July 2013
- Constituency: National PR

Personal details
- Born: 10 February 1960 (age 66) Mimata, Miyazaki, Japan
- Party: Democratic
- Education: Chuo University

Toshiharu Todoroki (轟木 利治, Todoroki Toshiharu; born February 10, 1960) is a Japanese politician of the Democratic Party of Japan, a member of the House of Councillors in the Diet (national legislature). A native of Mimata, Miyazaki and graduate of Chuo University, he was elected for the first time in 2007.
