= Japan National Route 220 =

Road in Japan

National Route 220
- 国道220号
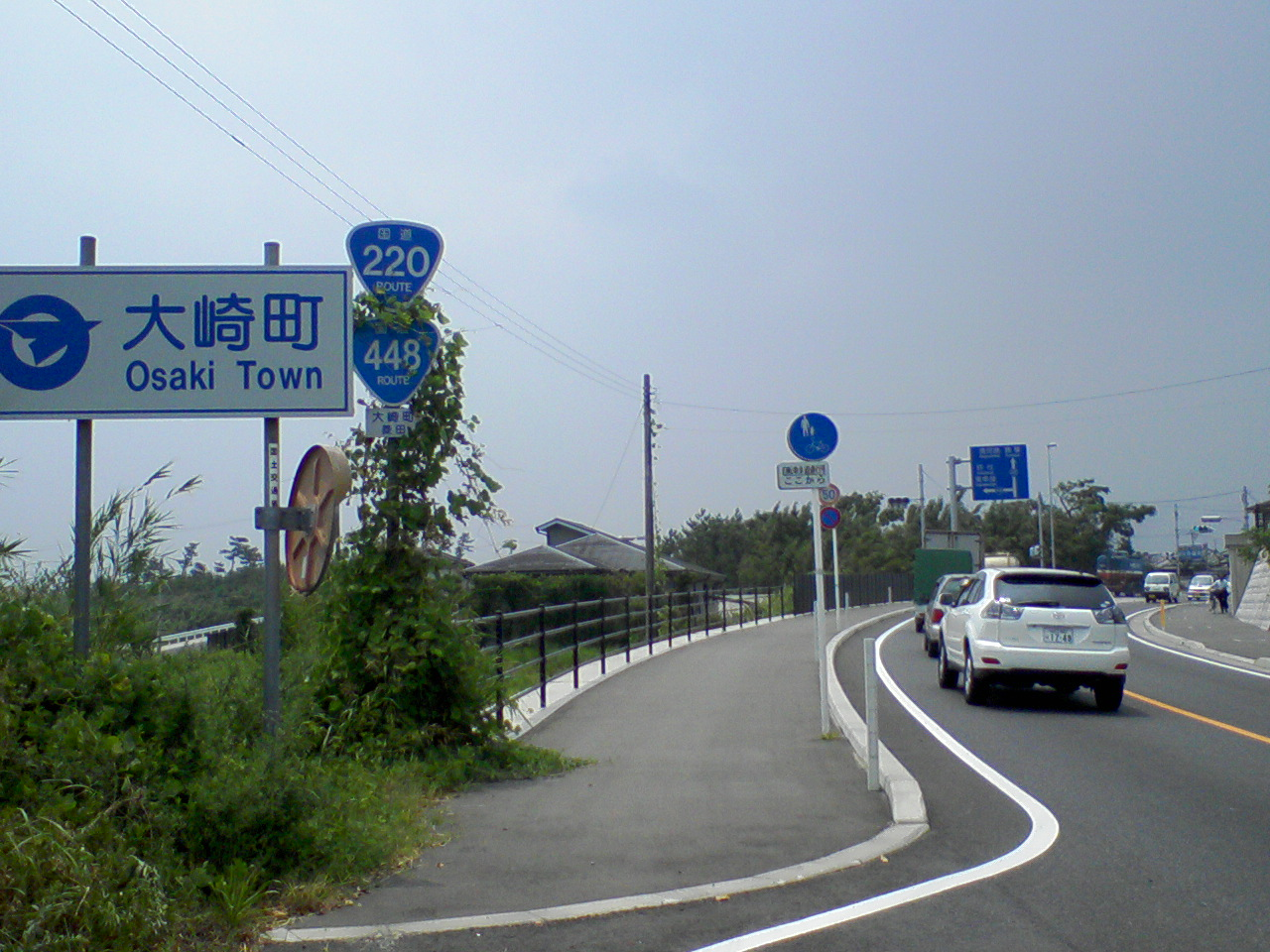

Route information
- Length: 186.1 km (115.6 mi)
- Existed: 18 May 1953–present

Major junctions
- West end: National Route 10 in Kirishima
- East end: National Route 10 in Miyazaki

Location
- Country: Japan

Highway system
- National highways of Japan; Expressways of Japan
← National Route 219	→ National Route 221

National Route 220 is a national highway of Japan connecting Miyazaki and Kirishima in Japan, with a total length of 186.1 km (115.64 mi).

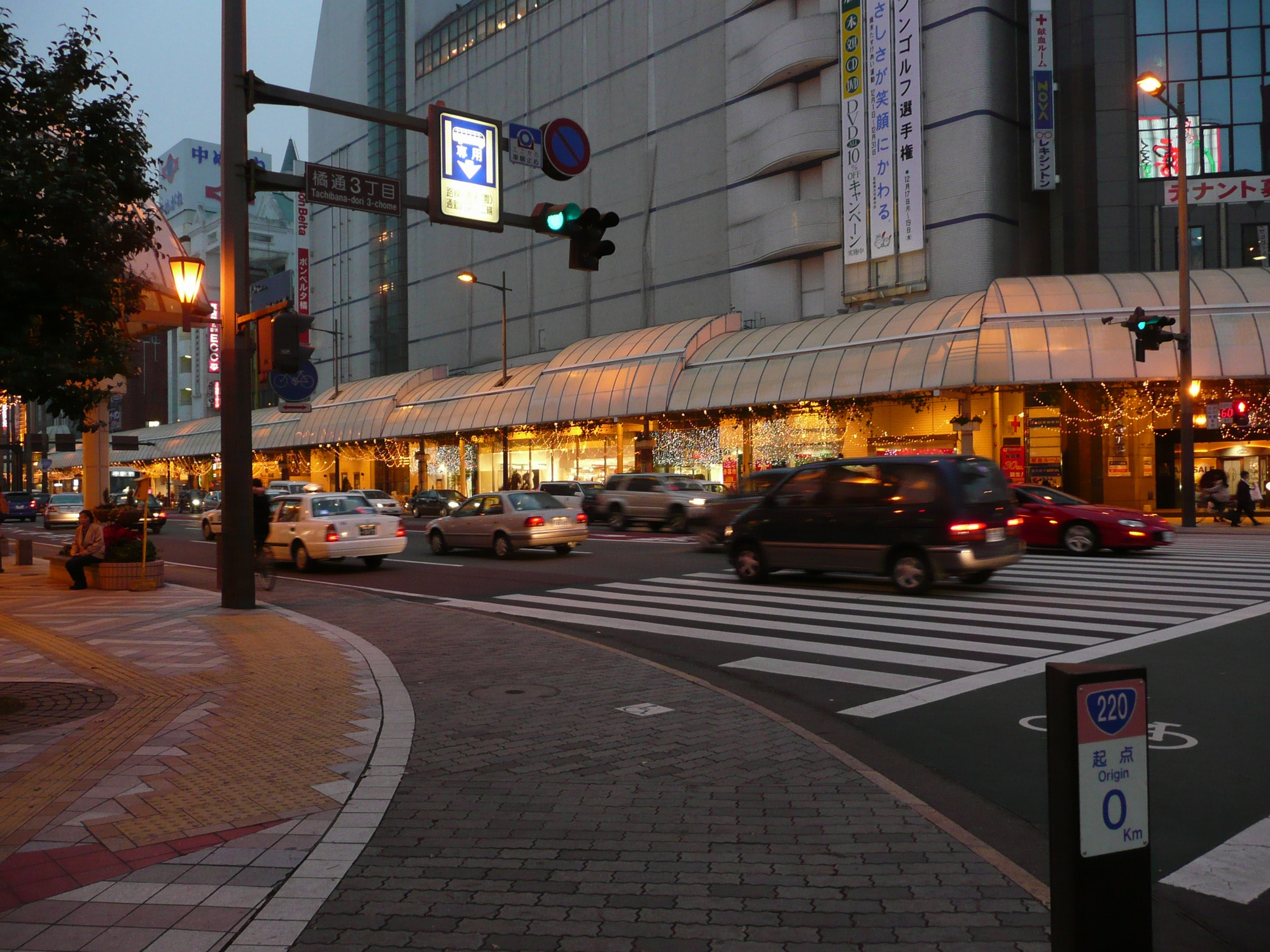
Origin (Central Miyazaki)

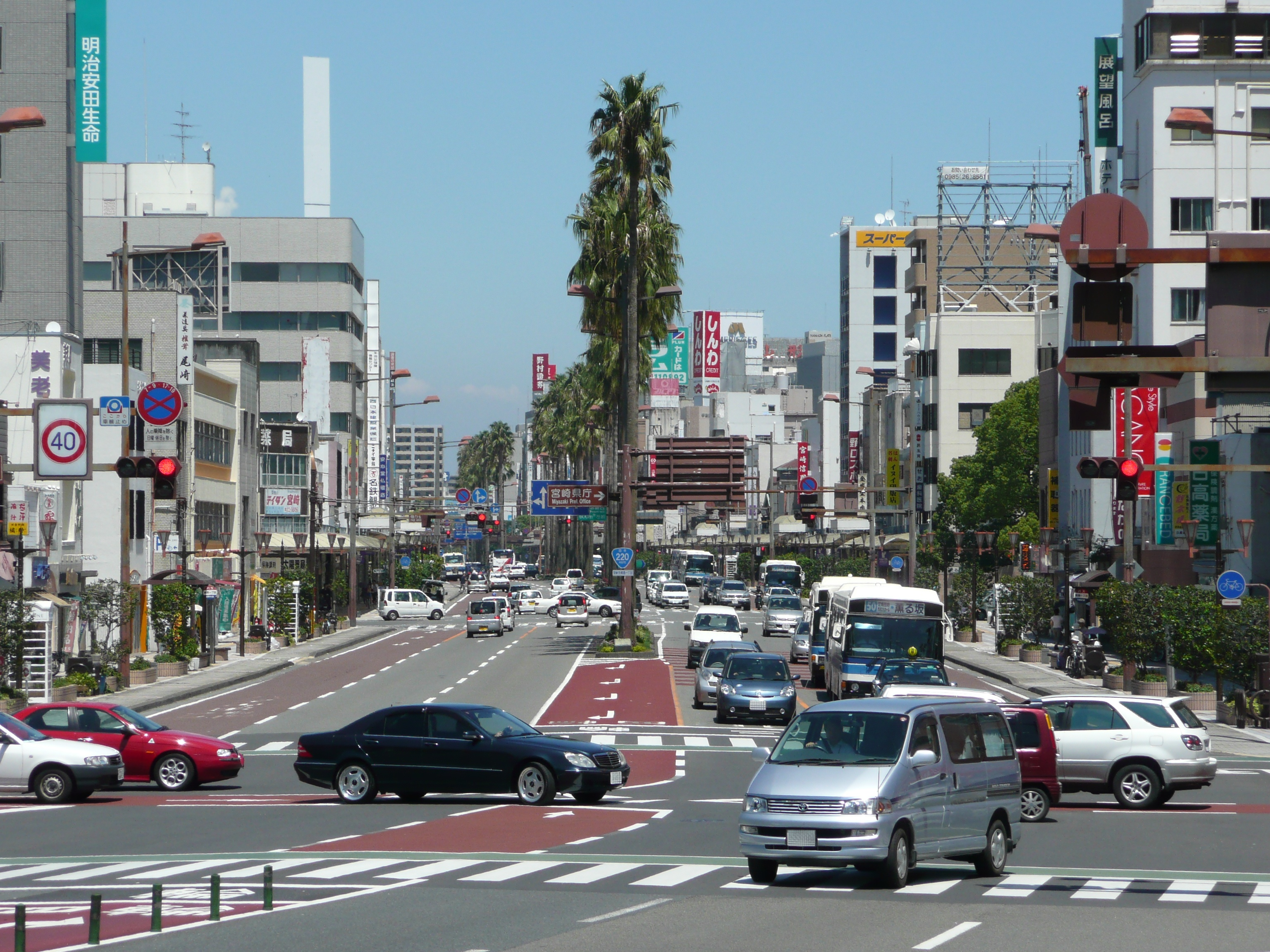
Tachibana Street (Miyazaki City)

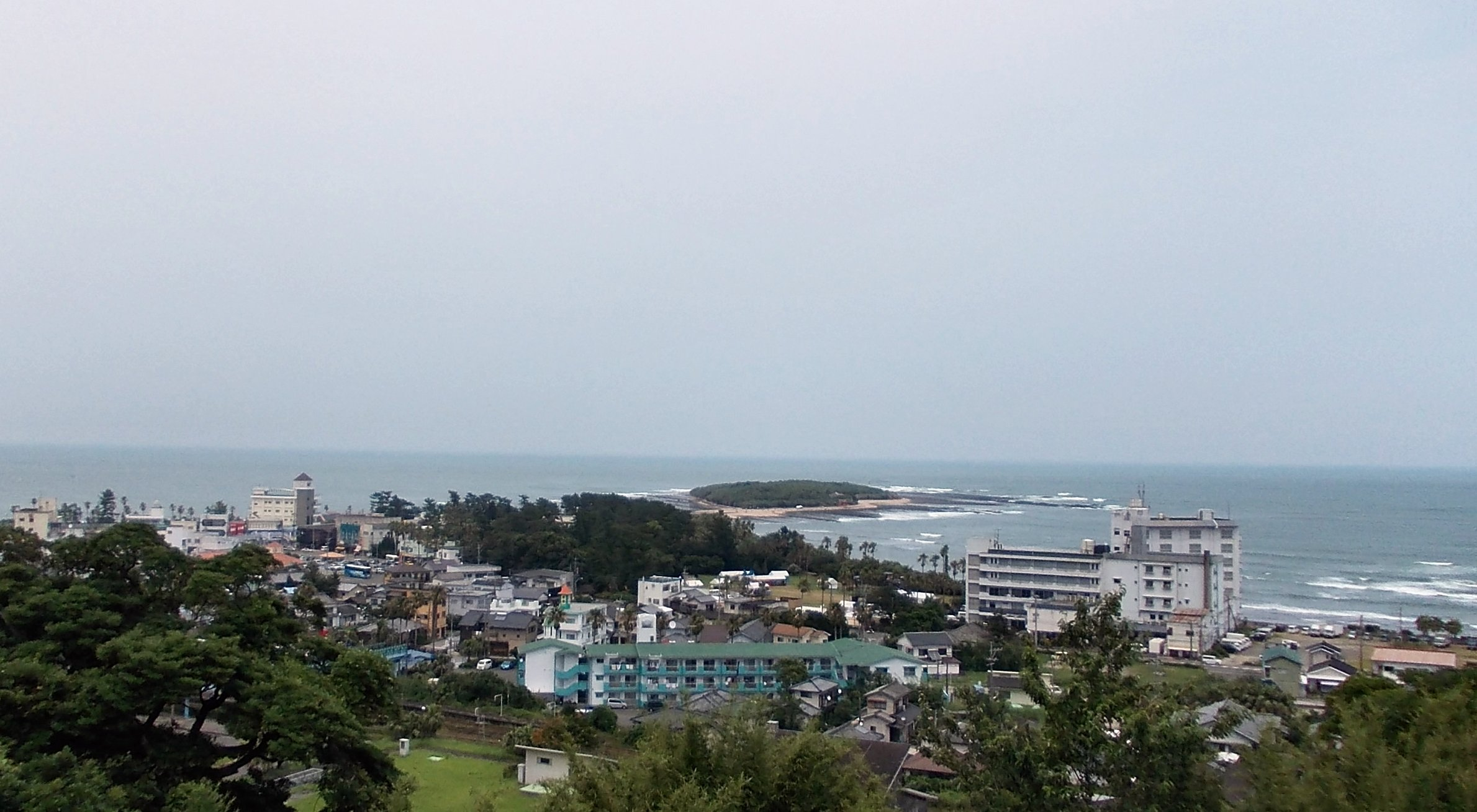
Aoshima from Aoshima Parking Area (Miyazaki City)

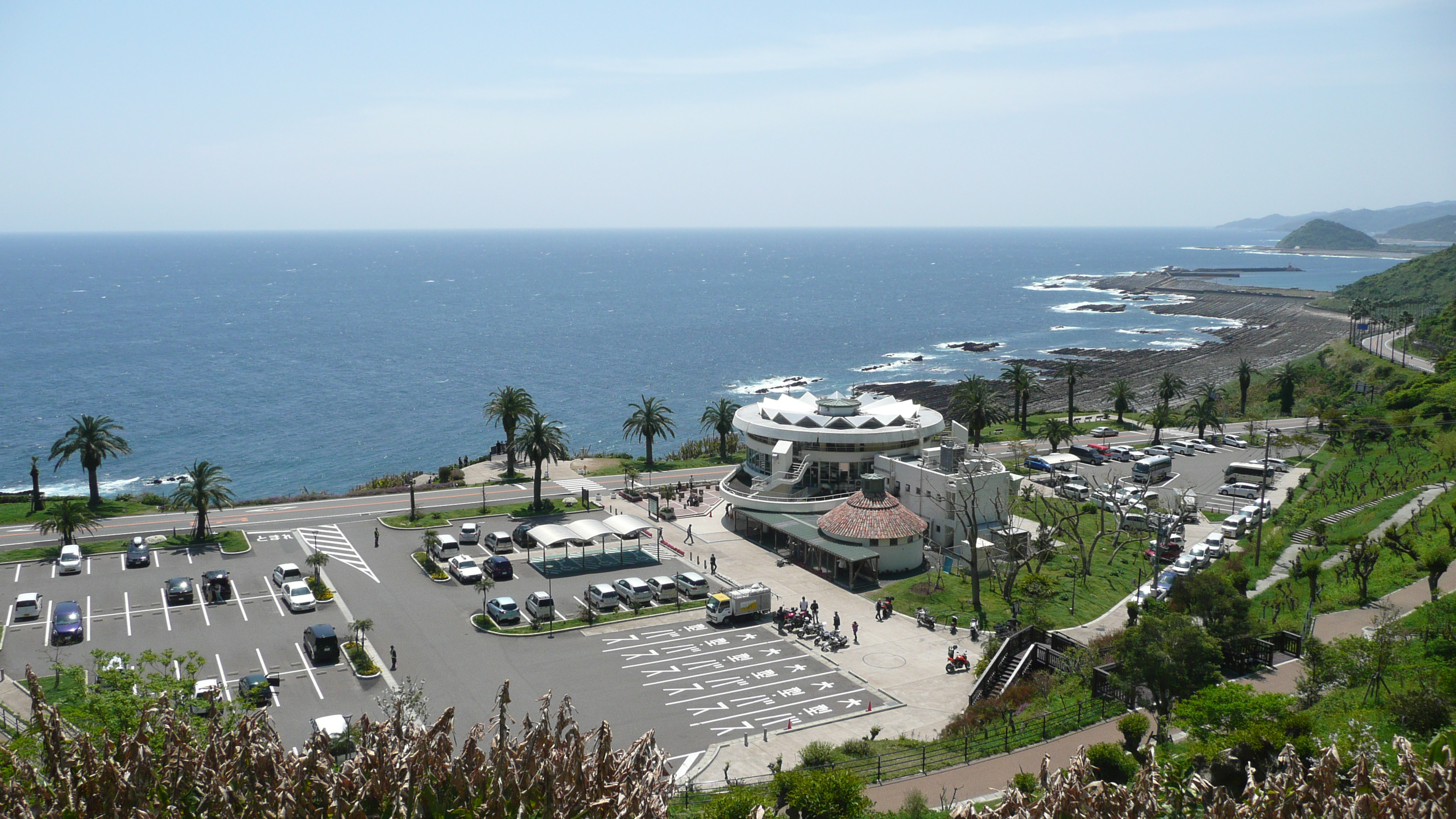
Michinoeki Phoenix (Horikiri Pass - Miyazaki City)

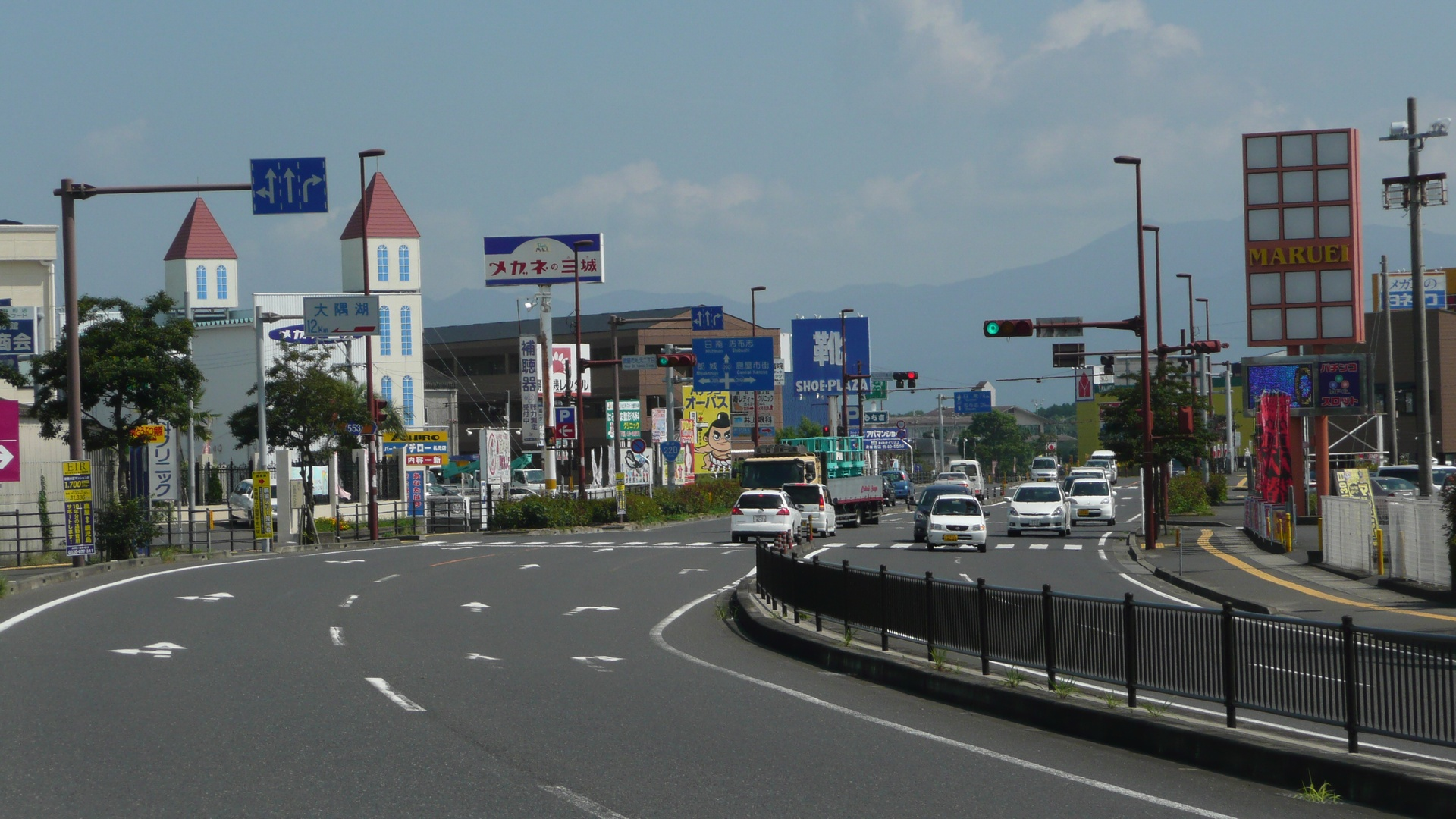
Kanoya City, Kagoshima
