= Japan National Route 269 =

Road in Japan

National Route 269
- 国道269号
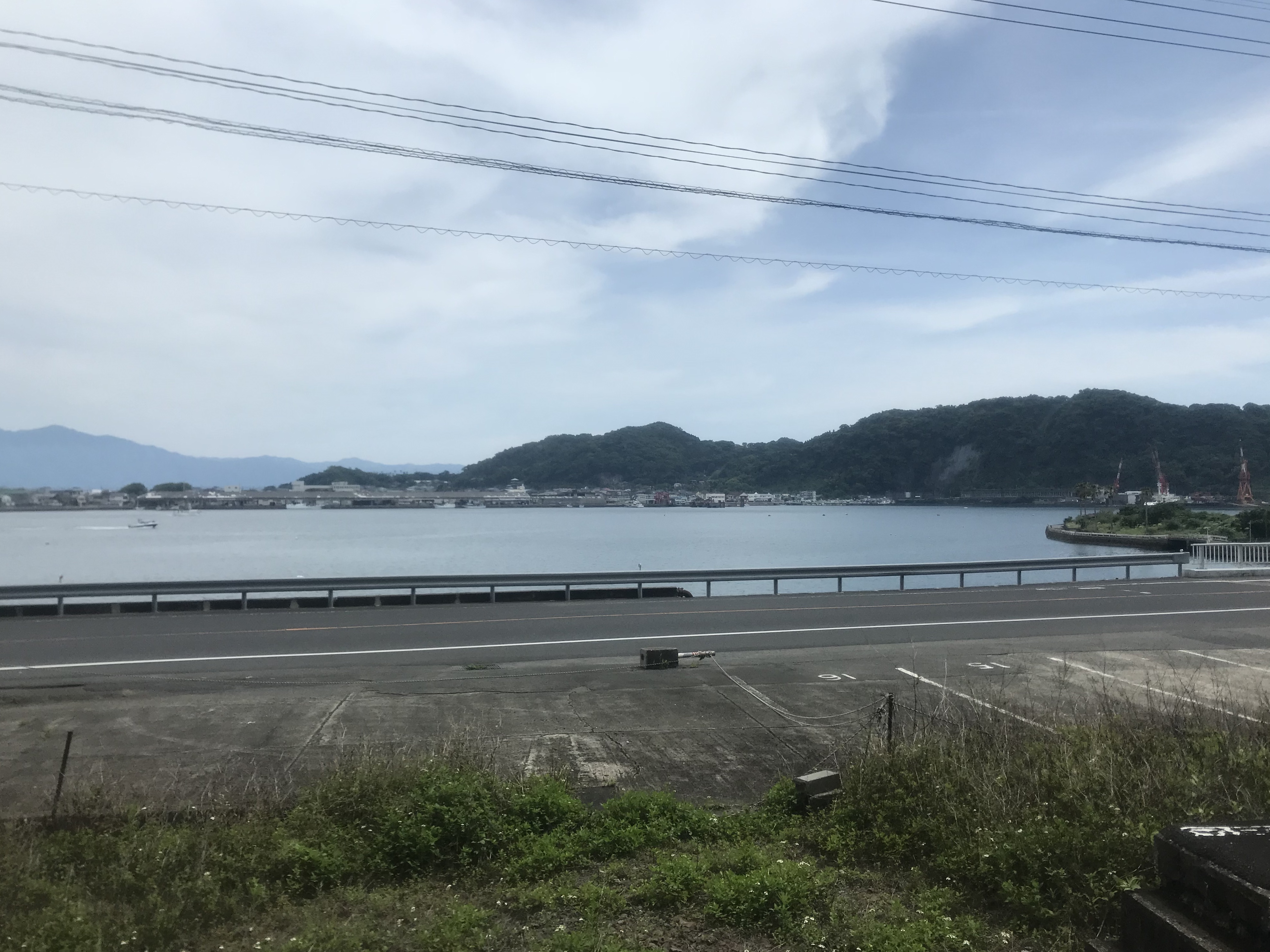
- View of the former town of Yamagawa from across the Yamagawa harbor. Route 269 is at the foreground.

Route information
- Length: 147.4 km (91.6 mi)

Location
- Country: Japan

Highway system
- National highways of Japan; Expressways of Japan
| ← National Route 268 | → National Route 270 |

National Route 269 is a national highway of Japan connecting Ibusuki, Kagoshima and Miyazaki, Miyazaki in Japan, with a total length of 147.4 km (91.59 mi).

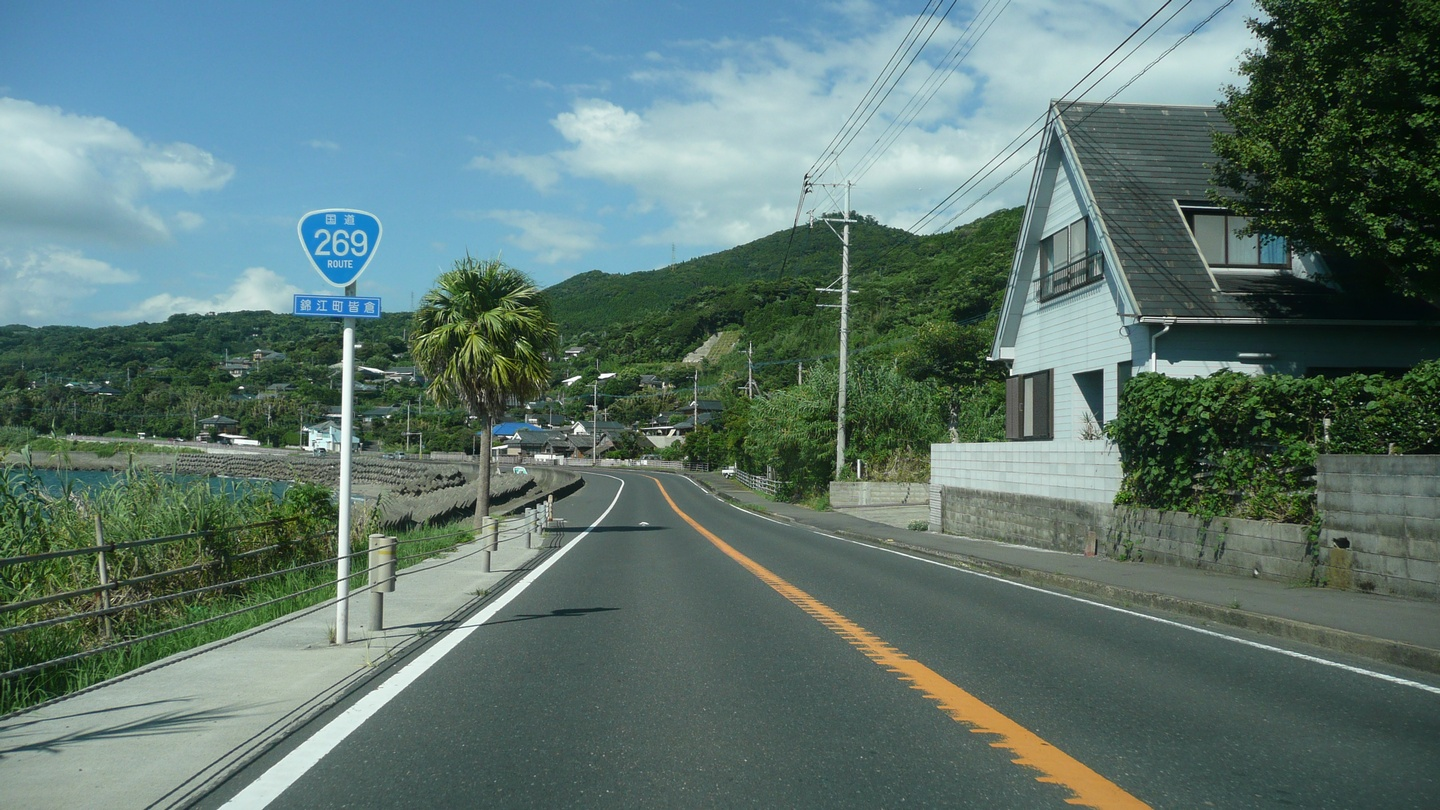
Kinkō Town

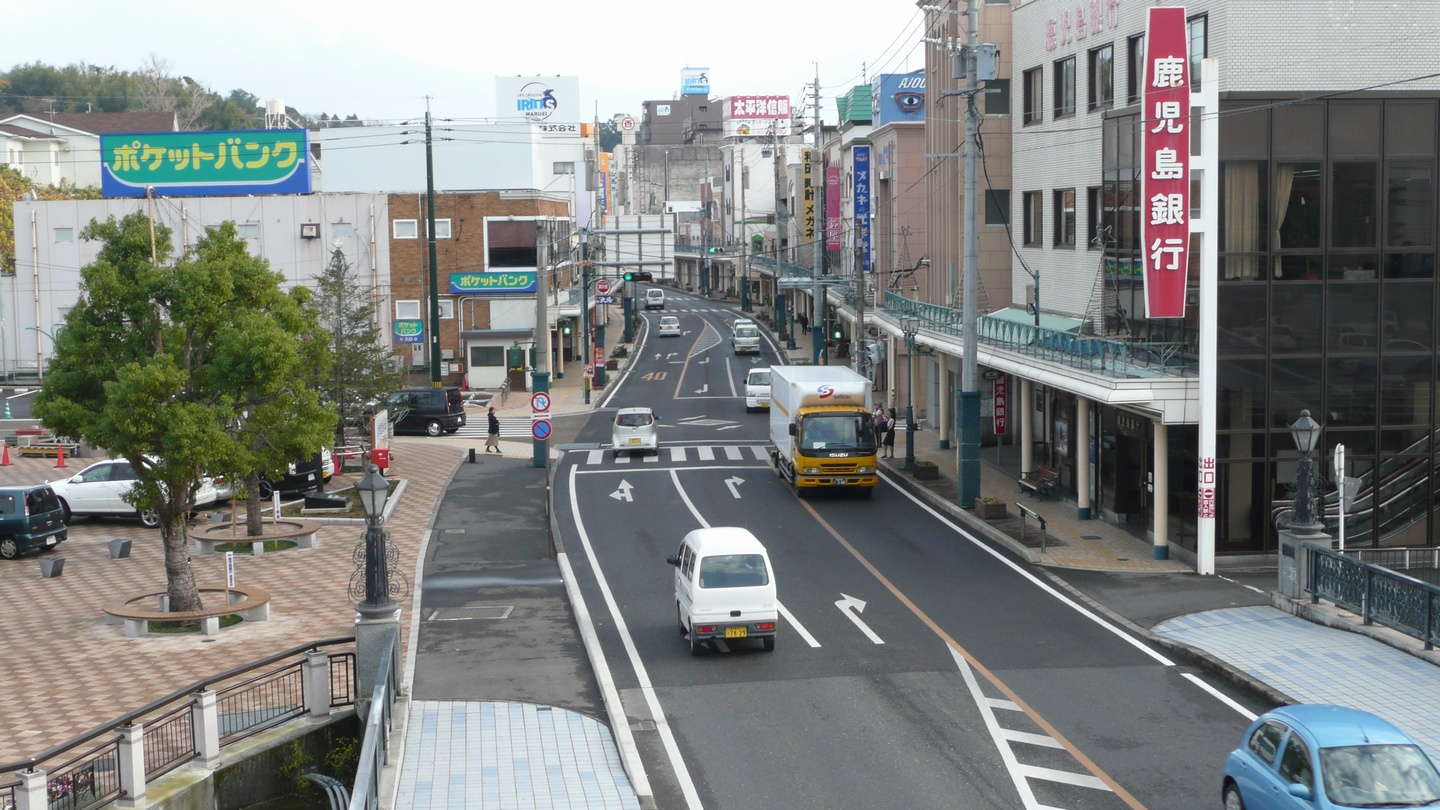
Kanoya City

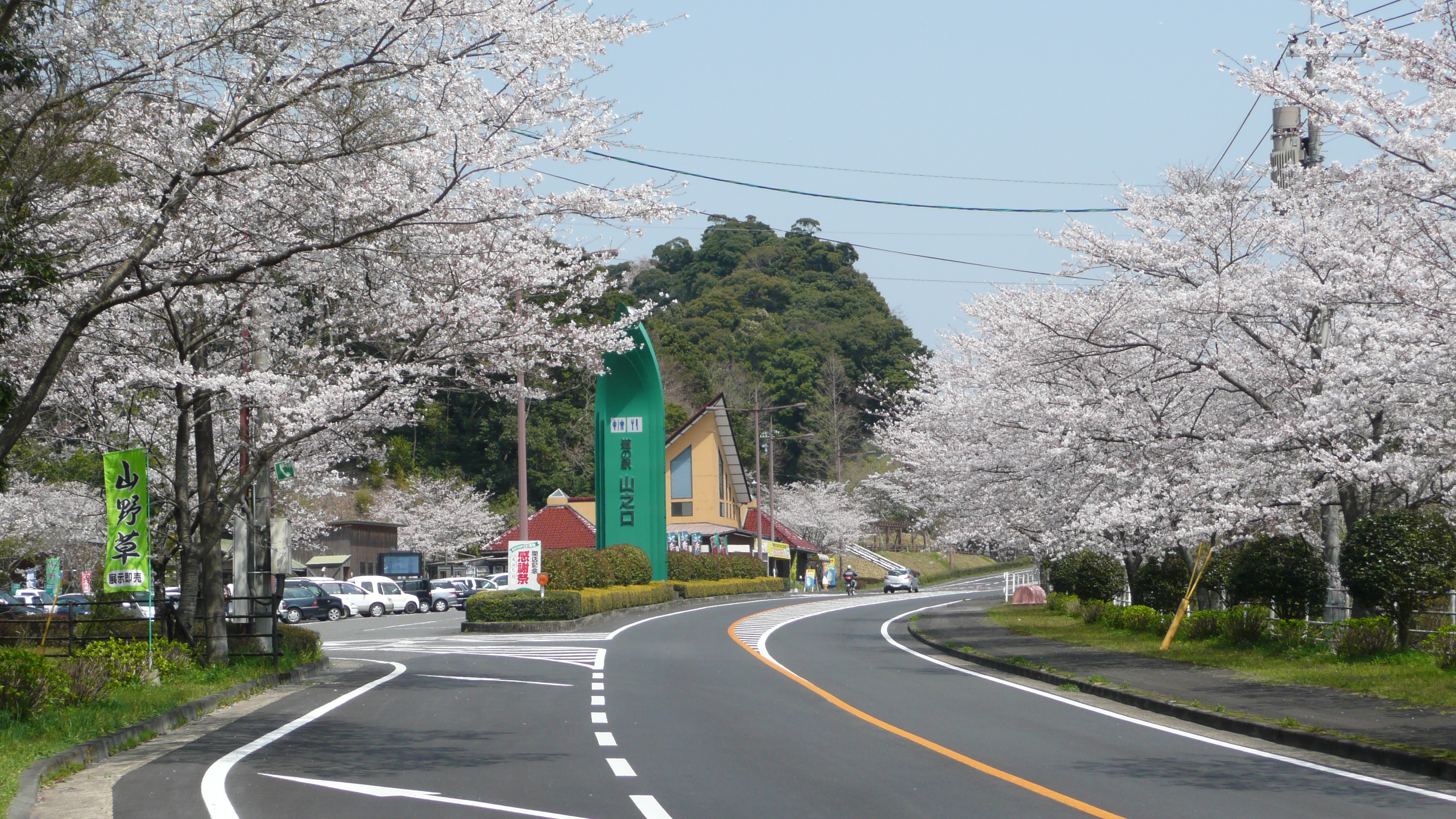
Miyakonojō City

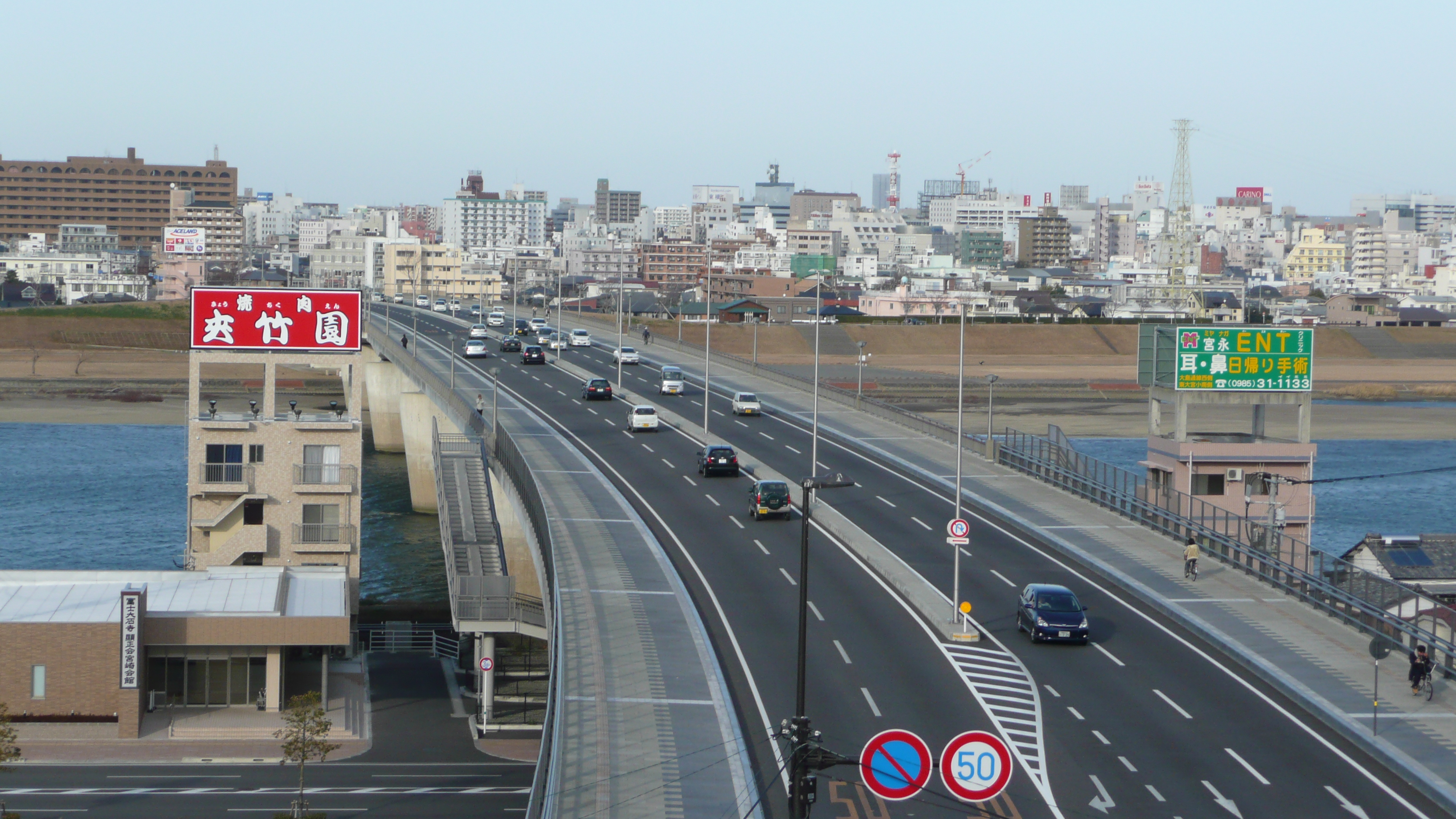
Tenman Bridge (Miyazaki City)
