= 2010 in Japan =

- Decades: 1990s; 2000s; 2010s; 2020s; 2030s
- See also: Other events of 2010; History of Japan • Timeline • Years

Events in the year 2010 in Japan.

== Incumbents ==
- Emperor – Akihito
- Prime Minister – Yukio Hatoyama (Democratic Party–Hokkaidō) until June 8, Naoto Kan (Democratic Party–Tokyo)
- Chief Cabinet Secretary: Hirofumi Hirano (D–Ōsaka) until January 7, Yoshito Sengoku (D–Tokushima)
- Chief Justice of the Supreme Court: Hironobu Takesaki
- President of the House of Representatives: Takahiro Yokomichi (D–Hokkaidō)
- President of the House of Councillors: Satsuki Eda (D–Okayama) until July 25, Takeo Nishioka (D–proportional) from July 30
- Diet sessions: 174th (regular, January 18 to June 16), 175th (extraordinary, July 30 to August 6), 176th (extraordinary, October 1 to December 3)

=== Governors ===
- Aichi Prefecture: Masaaki Kanda
- Akita Prefecture: Norihisa Satake
- Aomori Prefecture: Shingo Mimura
- Chiba Prefecture: Kensaku Morita
- Ehime Prefecture: Moriyuki Kato (until 30 November); Tokihiro Nakamura (starting 1 December)
- Fukui Prefecture: Issei Nishikawa
- Fukuoka Prefecture: Wataru Asō
- Fukushima Prefecture: Yūhei Satō
- Gifu Prefecture: Hajime Furuta
- Gunma Prefecture: Masaaki Osawa
- Hiroshima Prefecture: Hidehiko Yuzaki
- Hokkaido: Harumi Takahashi
- Hyogo Prefecture: Toshizō Ido
- Ibaraki Prefecture: Masaru Hashimoto
- Ishikawa Prefecture: Masanori Tanimoto
- Iwate Prefecture: Takuya Tasso
- Kagawa Prefecture: Takeki Manabe (until 4 September); Keizō Hamada (starting 5 September)
- Kagoshima Prefecture: Satoshi Mitazono
- Kanagawa Prefecture: Shigefumi Matsuzawa
- Kochi Prefecture: Masanao Ozaki
- Kumamoto Prefecture: Ikuo Kabashima
- Kyoto Prefecture: Keiji Yamada
- Mie Prefecture: Akihiko Noro (until 20 April); Eikei Suzuki (starting 21 April)
- Miyagi Prefecture: Yoshihiro Murai
- Miyazaki Prefecture: Hideo Higashikokubaru
- Nagano Prefecture: Jin Murai (until 31 August); Shuichi Abe (starting 1 September)
- Nagasaki Prefecture: Genjirō Kaneko (until 1 March); Hōdō Nakamura (starting 2 March)
- Nara Prefecture: Shōgo Arai
- Niigata Prefecture: Hirohiko Izumida
- Oita Prefecture: Katsusada Hirose
- Okayama Prefecture: Masahiro Ishii
- Okinawa Prefecture: Hirokazu Nakaima
- Osaka Prefecture:Tōru Hashimoto
- Saga Prefecture: Yasushi Furukawa
- Saitama Prefecture: Kiyoshi Ueda
- Shiga Prefecture: Yukiko Kada
- Shiname Prefecture: Zenbe Mizoguchi
- Shizuoka Prefecture: Heita Kawakatsu
- Tochigi Prefecture: Tomikazu Fukuda
- Tokushima Prefecture: Kamon Iizumi
- Tokyo: Shintarō Ishihara
- Tottori Prefecture: Shinji Hirai
- Toyama Prefecture: Takakazu Ishii
- Wakayama Prefecture: Yoshinobu Nisaka
- Yamagata Prefecture: Mieko Yoshimura
- Yamaguchi Prefecture: Sekinari Nii
- Yamanashi Prefecture: Shōmei Yokouchi

== Events ==
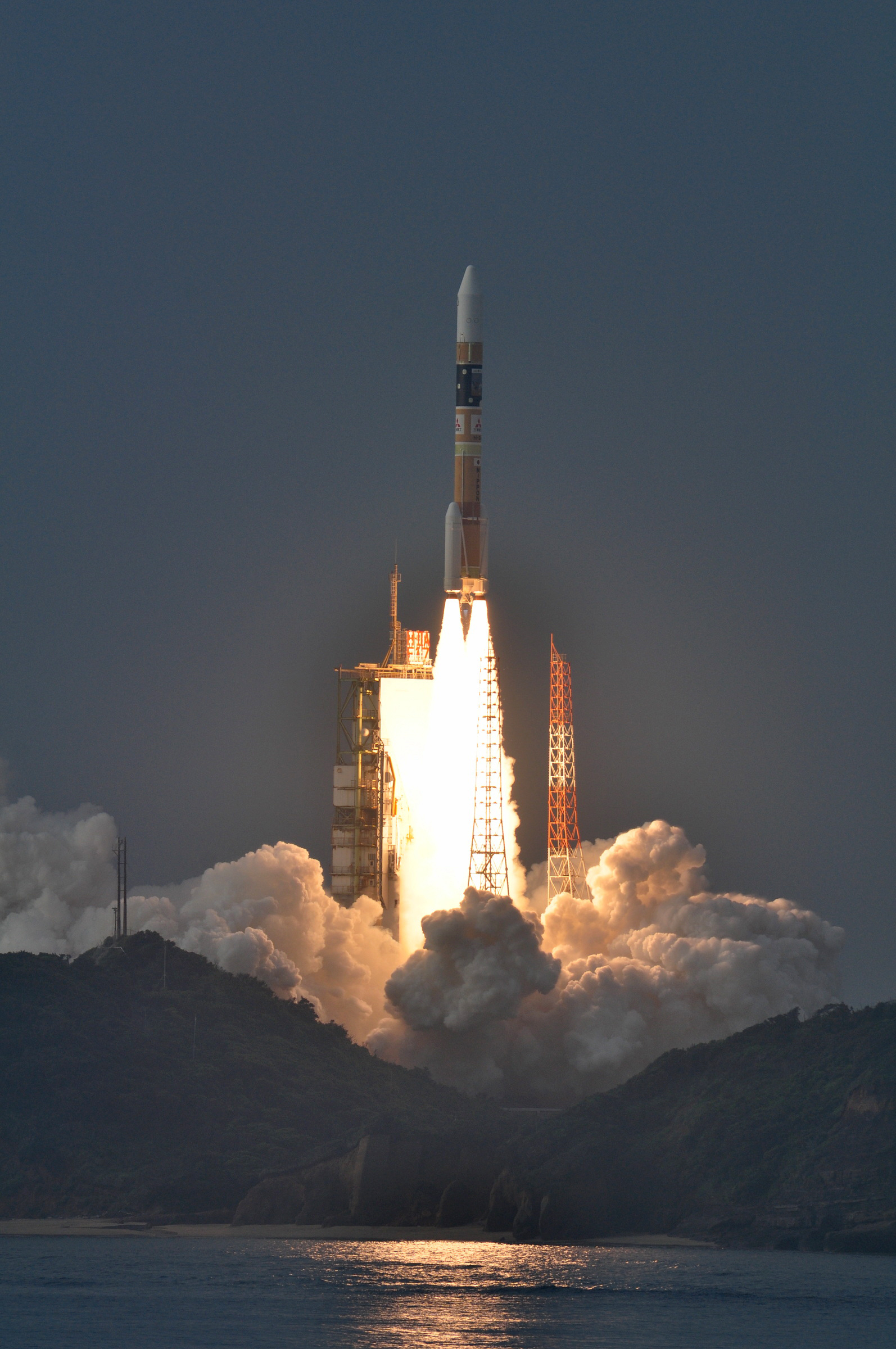
The launch of the venus probe Akatsuki, 20 May 2010

- January 1 – The towns of Nijō and Shima merged with the city of Maebaru to form the city of Itoshima.
- January 3 – Japan doubles a state-sponsored credit line to troubled airline Japan Airlines to ¥200bn (US$2.2bn).
- January 6 – Japanese Finance Minister Hirohisa Fujii resigns at the age of 77 due to ill health.
- January 12 – A gunman kills three people at a bar in Habikino, Japan, before turning the gun on himself.
- January 19 – Japanese air carrier Japan Airlines files for bankruptcy protection.
- February 1 – The town of Kozakai merged into the city of Toyokawa.
- May 20 – JAXA successfully launched the venus probe Akatsuki (formerly "Planet-C").
- April 17 – Snowfall in central Tokyo matches a record set in April 1967.
- April 25 – Nearly 100,000 people rally in Okinawa, Japan, demanding the removal of an American base from the island.
- June – September – According to Japanese government and Japan Meteorological Agency official confirmed report massive heat wave and extreme high temperature hit around Japan, total 1,731 person were human fatalities relative heat stroke.
- June 2 – Prime minister Yukio Hatoyama announced that he would be resigning as Prime Minister.
- June 4 – Naoto Kan is elected as the leader of the Democratic Party and therefore as Prime Minister of Japan, defeating Shinji Tarutoko.
- June 13 – The first Japanese asteroid probe, Hayabusa returned to Earth, after having landed on 25143 Itokawa in an effort to collect samples.
- July 11 – House of Councillors election
- August 9 – Japan marks the 65th anniversary of the 1945 atomic bombing of Nagasaki.
- September 11 – Jordan signs a nuclear co-operation treaty with Japan to build a nuclear power plant within 10 years.
- September 14 – Naoto Kan is reelected as the leader of the Democratic Party of Japan and therefore as Prime Minister of Japan, defeating powerbroker Ichiro Ozawa.
- October 20 – Devastating floods and landslide in Amami Island, 3 people die.
- December 7 – The spacecraft Akatsuki reaches Venus but fails to enter orbit around the planet.

=== Prefectural elections ===
- February 21 – In the 2010 Nagasaki gubernatorial election former vice governor Hōdō Nakamura is elected as successor of retiring incumbent Genjirō Kaneko.
- March 14 – Governor Masanori Tanimoto of Ishikawa is reelected for a fifth term.
- April 11 – 2010 Kyōto gubernatorial election: Incumbent Keiji Yamada wins a third term with support from both major parties.
- July 11 – In the 2010 Shiga gubernatorial election, center-left supported governor Yukiko Kada is reelected against LDP supported former national representative Ken'ichirō Ueno and a Communist candidate.
- August 8 – 2010 Nagano gubernatorial election: Supported by the center-left parties, Shuichi Abe, formerly vice governor under polarising governor Yasuo Tanaka, narrowly beats LDP supported outgoing vice governor Yoshimasa Koshihara by 5.000 votes to succeed retiring incumbent Jin Murai who had defeated Tanaka in 2006.
- August 29 – 2010 Kagawa gubernatorial election: With broad support from the non-Communist parties Keizō Hamada is elected to succeed governor Takeki Manabe who retired after three terms.
- October 31 – Governor Yūhei Satō of Fukushima is reelected against only one Communist challenger.
- November 28 – 2010 Wakayama gubernatorial election: Incumbent Yoshinobu Nisaka is reelected with centre-right support; 2010 Ehime gubernatorial election: Tokihiro Nakamura is elected to succeed retiring governor Moriyuki Kato; 2010 Okinawan gubernatorial election: Governor Hirokazu Nakaima defeats anti-USMC-base candidate Yōichi Iha.
- December 12 – 2010 Ibaraki prefectural election: With 39 percent of the vote, the LDP wins 33 of 65 seats and defends its majority.
- December 26 – In the 2010 Miyazaki gubernatorial election, vice governor Shunji Kōno wins a clear victory; incumbent comedian and former governor Hideo Higashikokubaru had retired after only one term in office.

== The Nobel Prize ==
- Ei-ichi Negishi, Akira Suzuki: 2010 Nobel Prize in Chemistry winners.

== Deaths ==
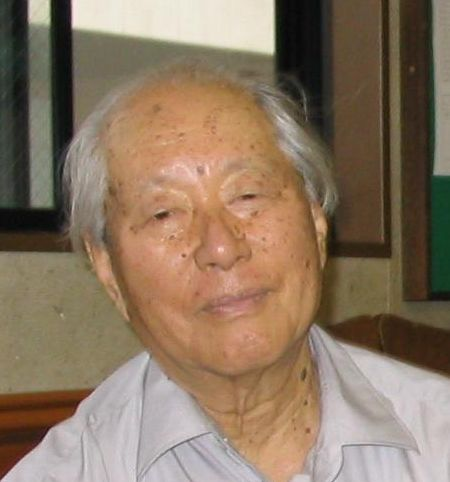
Takeo Kimura

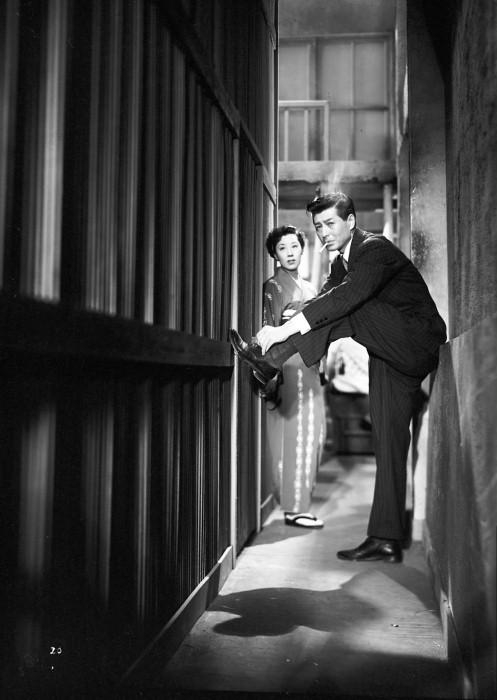
Ryō Ikebe

=== January ===
- January 1 – Tetsuo Narikawa, Japanese actor and karate instructor. (born 1944)
- January 4 – Tsutomu Yamaguchi, Japanese survivor of Hiroshima and Nagasaki atomic bombings (born 1916)
- January 13 – Isamu Tanonaka, Japanese voice actor (born 1932)
- January 16 – Takumi Shibano, Japanese novelist (born 1926)
- January 17 – Maki Asakawa, Japanese singer (born 1942)
- January 17 – Daisuke Gōri, Japanese voice actor (born 1952)
- January 28 – Keiko Tobe, Japanese manga artist (born 1957)

=== February ===
- February 1 – Atsushi Kuroi, Japanese professional drifting driver (born 1969)
- February 5 – Hiroyuki Oze, Japanese baseball player (born 1985)
- February 8 – Wahei Tatematsu, Japanese novelist (born 1948)
- February 11 – Umetsugu Inoue, Japanese film director (born 1923)
- February 17 – Makoto Fujita, Japanese actor and comedian (born 1933)
- February 26 – Nujabes, Japanese hip hop composer (born 1974)
- February 28 – Chushiro Hayashi, Japanese astrophysicist (born 1920)

=== March ===
- March 4 – Tetsuo Kondo, Japanese politician, former Minister of Labour (born 1929)
- March 16 – Hachiro Maekawa, Japanese baseball player (born 1912)
- March 21 – Takeo Kimura, Japanese art director (born 1918)
- March 23 – Jiro Nagasawa, Japanese Olympic swimmer and national coach (born 1932)
- March 26 – Kwon Hyi-ro, Japanese-born Korean murderer (born 1928)

=== April ===
- April 3 – Yasunori Watanabe, Japanese rugby player (born 1974)
- April 4 – Shio Satō, Japanese manga artist (born 1952)
- April 6 – Katsumi Nishikawa, Japanese film director (born 1918)
- April 7 – Takuya Kimura, Japanese baseball player and coach (born 1972)
- April 9 – Hisashi Inoue, Japanese pacifist playwright (born 1934)
- April 10 – Hiro Muramoto, Japanese news cameraman and journalist (born 1966)
- April 20 – Mr. Hito, Japanese professional wrestler (born 1942)
- April 27 – Tanie Kitabayashi, Japanese actress (born 1911)
- April 30 – Tadahiro Ando, Japanese politician, former Governor of Miyazaki Prefecture (born 1895)

=== May ===
- May 2 – Kama Chinen, Japanese supercentenarian, verified oldest living person (born 1895)
- May 9 – Teruji Kogake, Japanese Olympic athlete (born 1932)
- May 18 – Shusaku Arakawa, Japanese artist and architect (born 1936)
- May 30 – Hanji Aoki, Japanese sports official (born 1915)

=== June ===
- June 1 – Kazuo Ohno, Japanese dancer (born 1906)
- June 11 – Shunsuke Ikeda, Japanese actor (born 1941)
- June 15 – Tadashi Kawashima, Japanese manga artist (born 1969)
- June 23 – Hiromu Naruse, Japanese chief test driver for Toyota Motor Company (born 1944)
- June 26 – Akira Nakamura, Japanese historian (born 1934)

=== July ===
- July 9 – Nobuyoshi Tamura, Japanese aikidoka (born 1933)
- July 14 – Tetsuo Mizutori, Japanese voice actor (born 1938)
- July 15 – Daisuke Ochida, Japanese vocalist (born 1978)
- July 19 – Daiki Sato, Japanese footballer. (born 1988)

=== August ===
- August 4 – Daikirin Takayoshi, Japanese sumo wrestler (born 1942)
- August 21 – Masaru Nashimoto, Japanese reporter (born 1944)
- August 23 – Kihachirō Kawamoto, Japanese puppet designer and animator. (born 1925)
- August 24 – Satoshi Kon, Japanese anime film director (born 1963)

=== September ===
- September 1 – Wakanohana Kanji I, Japanese sumo wrestler (born 1928)
- September 5 – Shoya Tomizawa, Japanese motorcycle rider (born 1990)
- September 11 – Kei Tani, Japanese comedian (born 1932)
- September 16 – Keiju Kobayashi, Japanese actor (born 1923)

=== October ===
- October 7 – Keiji Ohsawa, Japanese baseball player (born 1932)
- October 8 – Ryō Ikebe, Japanese actor (born 1918)
- October 29 – Takeshi Shudo, Japanese scriptwriter (born 1949)

=== December ===
- December 28 – Hideko Takamine, actress (born 1924)

== See also ==
- 2010 in Japanese music
- 2010 in Japanese television
- List of Japanese films of 2010
