= Miyazaki 3rd district =

Legislative district of Japan

- Parliamentary constituency for the Japanese House of Representatives
- Numbered map of Miyazaki Prefecture single-member districts
- Prefecture: Miyazaki
- Proportional District: Kyushu
- Electorate: 268,489

Current constituency
- Created: 1994
- Seats: One
- Party: Liberal Democratic
- Representative: Yoshihisa Furukawa
- Municipalities: Ebino, Kobayashi, Kushima, Miyakonojo, Nichinan, Kitamorokata District and Nishimorokata District

Miyazaki 3rd district (宮崎県第3区, Miyazaki-ken dai-sanku or simply 宮崎3区, Miyazaki-sanku ) is a single-member constituency of the House of Representatives in the national Diet of Japan located in Miyazaki Prefecture.

== Areas covered ==
=== Since 2013 ===
- Ebino
- Kobayashi
- Kushima
- Miyakonojo
- Nichinan
- Kitamorokata District
- Nishimorokata District

=== 1994–2013 ===
- Ebino
- Kobayashi
- Kushima
- Miyakonojo
- Nichinan
- Minaminaka District
- Kitamorokata District
- Nishimorokata District

== List of representatives ==
Election	Representative	Party	Notes
1996	Kazumi Mochinaga	Liberal Democratic	
2000	Kazumi Mochinaga	Liberal Democratic	
2003	Yoshihisa Furukawa	Independent	
2005	Yoshihisa Furukawa	Independent	
2009	Yoshihisa Furukawa	Liberal Democratic	
2012	Yoshihisa Furukawa	Liberal Democratic	
2014	Yoshihisa Furukawa	Liberal Democratic	
2017	Yoshihisa Furukawa	Liberal Democratic	
2021	Yoshihisa Furukawa	Liberal Democratic	
2024	Yoshihisa Furukawa	Liberal Democratic	
2026	Yoshihisa Furukawa	Liberal Democratic	

== Election results ==
2026
Party	Candidate	Votes	%	±%
LDP	Yoshihisa Furukawa (incumbent)	94,868	77.1	▼2.1
Sanseitō	Daisuke Takase	28,148	22.8	
Registered electors		262,173		
Turnout			49.51	▲2.51
LDP hold				

2024
Party	Candidate	Votes	%	±%
Liberal Democratic (endorsed by Komeito)	Yoshihisa Furukawa (incumbent)	94,009	79.18	
JCP	Shinmura Hatsuyo	24,733	20.83	
Majority		69,276	58.35	
Registered electors		266,041		
Turnout		118,742	47.00	▼4.53
LDP hold				

2021
Party	Candidate	Votes	%	±%
Liberal Democratic (endorsed by Komeito)	Yoshihisa Furukawa (incumbent)	111,845	80.73	
Communist (endorsed by SDP)	Takashi Matsumoto	20,342	14.68	
Anti-NHK	Yuhei Jūkuroki	6,347	4.58	New
Majority		91,503	66.05	
Registered electors		274,053		
Turnout			51.53	▲0.96
LDP hold				

2017
Party	Candidate	Votes	%	±%
Liberal Democratic (endorsed by Komeito)	Yoshihisa Furukawa (incumbent)	98,008	69.39	
Kibō no Tō	Tomofumi Hanawa	28,286	20.03	New
Communist	Mitoshi Ifuku	14,942	10.58	
Majority		69,722	49.36	
Registered electors		285,176		
Turnout			50.57	▲1.01
LDP hold				

2014
Party	Candidate	Votes	%	±%
Liberal Democratic (endorsed by Komeito)	Yoshihisa Furukawa (incumbent)	108,051	78.50	
Communist	Kazuhito Raijū	29,599	21.50	
Majority		78,452	57.00	
Registered electors		286,688		
Turnout			49.56	
LDP hold				

2012
Party	Candidate	Votes	%	±%
Liberal Democratic (endorsed by Komeito)	Yoshihisa Furukawa (incumbent)	119,174	81.79	
Communist	Kazuhito Raijū	26,533	18.21	N/A
Majority		92,641	63.58	
Turnout				
LDP hold				

2009
Party	Candidate	Votes	%	±%
Liberal Democratic	Yoshihisa Furukawa (incumbent)	131,908	67.40	
Social Democratic	Hidetoshi Matsumura	58,343	29.81	New
Happiness Realization	Shinji Matsubara	5,460	2.79	New
Majority		73,565	37.59	
Turnout				
LDP hold				

2005
Party	Candidate	Votes	%	±%
Independent	Yoshihisa Furukawa (incumbent)	102,816	49.58	
Liberal Democratic	Tetsuji Mochinaga	82,204	39.64	N/A
Democratic	Itsuki Toyama	22,352	10.78	New
Majority		20,612	9.94	
Turnout				
Independent hold				

2003
Party	Candidate	Votes	%	±%
Independent	Yoshihisa Furukawa	118,607	63.17	
Independent	Tetsuji Mochinaga	58,353	31.08	New
Communist	Mitoshi Ifuku	10,801	5.75	
Majority		60,254	32.09	
Turnout				
Independent gain from LDP				

2000
Party	Candidate	Votes	%	±%
Liberal Democratic	Kazumi Mochinaga (incumbent)	103,729	52.25	
Independent	Yoshihisa Furukawa	79,081	39.83	New
Communist	Takeo Nukumizu	13,006	6.55	
Liberal League	Akira Kae	2,717	1.37	New
Majority		24,648	12.42	
Turnout				
LDP hold				

1996
Party	Candidate	Votes	%	±%
Liberal Democratic	Kazumi Mochinaga	89,671	53.11	New
New Frontier	Yoshihisa Furukawa	62,211	36.85	New
Communist	Ken Nakano	16,962	10.05	New
Majority		27,460	16.26	
Turnout				
LDP win (new seat)				
