= Iwase =

Iwase may refer to:

== Places ==
- Iwase Province
- Iwase, Fukushima
- Iwase, Ibaraki
- Iwase District, Fukushima
- Iwase Dam
- Iwase Station

== Other uses ==
- Iwase (surname)
