= 2014 Kagawa gubernatorial election =

← 2010	31 August 2014	2018 →
- Turnout: 33.60 ▼3.32
Governor before election
Keizo Hamada
LDP
Elected Governor
Keizo Hamada
LDP

A gubernatorial election was held on 31 August 2014 to elect the next governor of Kagawa (石川県, Kagawa-ken), a prefecture of Japan located in the north of the Shikoku island.

== Candidates ==
- Keizo Hamada, 62, incumbent since 2010, former Finance Ministry bureaucrat. He was supported by LDP, New Komeito, SDP and the local chapter of DPJ.
- Tadashi Kawamura, 55, secretary general of JCP prefectural committee.

== Results ==
2014 Kagawa gubernatorial election
Party	Candidate	Votes	%	±%
LDP	Keizo Hamada	223,846	83.57	▲28.70
JCP	Tadashi Kawamura	44,023	16.43	▲8.75
Turnout		273,594	33.60	▼3.32
Total valid votes		267,869	97.91	
Registered electors		814,209		
LDP hold		Swing	67.14	
