= Yoshihisa Furukawa =

Japanese politician (born 1965)

- 古川 禎久
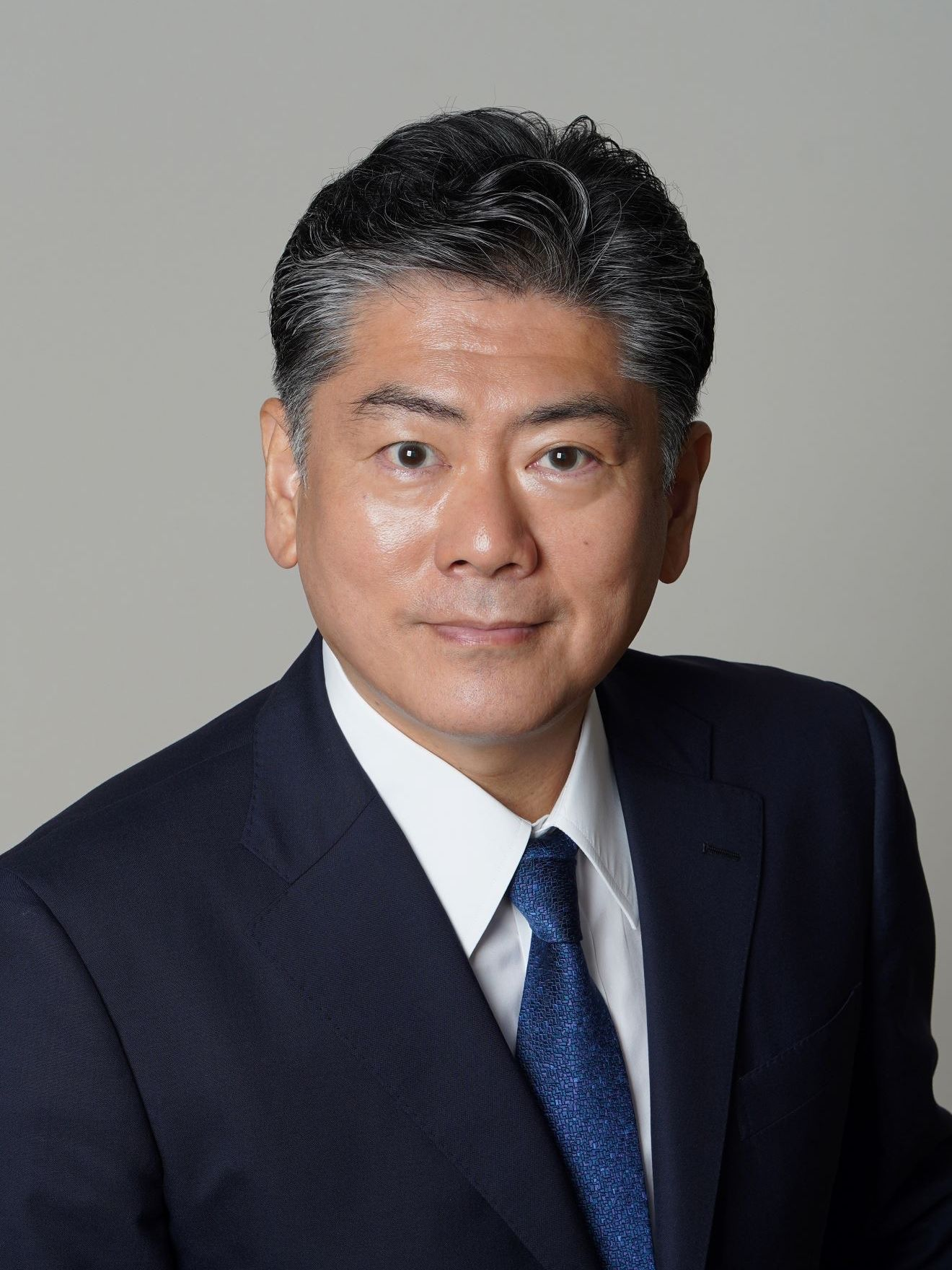
- Official portrait, 2021

Minister of Justice
- In office 4 October 2021 – 10 August 2022
- Prime Minister: Fumio Kishida
- Preceded by: Yōko Kamikawa
- Succeeded by: Yasuhiro Hanashi

Member of the House of Representatives
- Incumbent
- Assumed office 10 November 2003
- Preceded by: Kazumi Mochinaga
- Constituency: Miyazaki 3rd

Personal details
- Born: 3 August 1965 (age 61) Kushima, Miyazaki, Japan
- Party: Liberal Democratic
- Other political affiliations: New Frontier (1996–1998); Independent (1998–2003; 2005–2006)
- Education: University of Tokyo

Yoshihisa Furukawa (古川 禎久, Furukawa Yoshihisa; born 3 August 1965) is a Japanese politician who served as the Minister of Justice from October 2021 to August 2022. He is serving in the House of Representatives since 2003, as a member of the Liberal Democratic Party.

== Life ==
Furukawa was born on 3 August 1965, in Kushima, Miyazaki. His family owned a small shōchū factory and a liquor store.

He entered the La Salle Academy, and was expelled from the dormitory during middle school. After graduating from La Salle Academy High School, he entered the University of Tokyo. There, he was in the same class with Masahiko Shibayama and Takashi Yamashita. After graduating from the University of Tokyo, he joined the Ministry of Construction in 1989. He later left and served as political secretary to Representative Tokihiro Nakamura.

After unsuccessful runs in 1996 and 2000, he was elected to the House of Representatives for the first time in 2003 as an independent. He subsequently joined the Liberal Democratic Party.

Furukawa was the first secretary general of the Suigetsukai, Shigeru Ishiba's political faction formed in September 2015. He managed Ishiba's unsuccessful campaign for the LDP presidency in 2018. He stepped down as secretary general of the faction at the end of the year.

Furukawa was appointed minister of justice in the Kishida cabinet in October 2021. He held the role until a reshuffle in August 2022.

Furukawa became head of the LDP headquarters promoting fiscal consolidation in October 2023, succeeding Fukushiro Nukaga who was elected Speaker of the House. They were in conflict with a separate policy group under Shoji Nishida advocating expansionary policy. In April 2025, the groups merged into a Fiscal Reform Headquarters (財政改革検討本部) headed by Itsunori Onodera, with Furukawa and Nishida as deputies.

Furukawa opposed the consumption tax cut under the Takaichi cabinet. He was one of four LDP members who abstained from voting on the bill by leaving the House chamber against party discipline.

Political offices
Preceded by Yōko Kamikawa	Minister of Justice; 2021–2022	Succeeded by Yasuhiro Hanashi
