= Miike =

Miike may refer to:

- The Miike coal mine, Japan
- Takashi Miike, Japanese filmmaker
- Miike Domain
- Miike District, Fukuoka
- Lake Miike

== See also ==
- Miike Snow, Swedish electronic band
