= 2006 Nagano gubernatorial election =

← 2002	6 August 2006	2010 →
- Turnout: 65.98 ▼7.80
Governor before election
Yasuo Tanaka
NP-Nippon
Elected Governor
Jin Murai
LDP

A gubernatorial election was held on 6 August 2006 to elect the next governor of Nagano (長野県, Nagano-ken), a prefecture of Japan located in the Chūbu region of Honshu island.

== Candidates ==
- Yasuo Tanaka, 50, incumbent since 2000, novelist. President of the New Party Nippon, he was also supported by the SDP and JCP.
- Jin Murai, 69, is a former veteran LDP lawmaker who has held key posts, including head of the National Public Safety Commission. He was also endorsed by New Komeito.

== Results ==
Nagano gubernatorial 2006
Party	Candidate	Votes	%	±%
LDP	Jin Murai	612,725	53.42	▲21.66
NP-Nippon	Yasuo Tanaka *	534,229	46.58	▼17.71
Turnout		1.157.782	65,98	▼7.80
Registered electors		1.754.738		
Swing to LDP from Social Democratic		Swing	6.84	
