= 2002 Nagano gubernatorial election =

← 2000	1 September 2002	2006 →
- Turnout: 73.78 ▲4.21
Governor before election
Yasuo Tanaka
Social Democratic
Elected Governor
Yasuo Tanaka
Social Democratic

A gubernatorial election was held on 1 September 2002 to elect the next governor of Nagano (長野県, Nagano-ken), a prefecture of Japan located in the Chūbu region of Honshu island.

== Candidates ==
- Yasuo Tanaka, 46, incumbent since 2000, novelist. Meanwhile, he was officially not supported by any party, the SDP and JCP supported him.
- Keiko Hasegawa, 50, lawyer. She was supported by the LDP, New Komeito party and the NCP.
- Shu Ichikawa, 50, a board member of a Tokyo-based think tank led by Tokyo Gov. Shintaro Ishihara (LDP).
- Chozo Nakagawa, 46, former company employee, graduate student at Shinshu University.
- Hideyoshi Hashiba, 52, wealthy company owner.
- Nobuaki Hanaoka, 56, Sankei Shimbun editorial writer. He gave up after agreeing to support Hasegawa in exchange for Hasegawa's adopting some of his campaign policies, but appear on the electoral ballot.

== Results ==
Nagano gubernatorial 2002
Party	Candidate	Votes	%	±%
Social Democratic	Yasuo Tanaka	822,897	64.29	
LDP	Keiko Hasegawa	406,559	31.76	
LDP	Shu Ichikawa	24,261	1.90	
	Chozo Nakagawa	15,255	1.19	
	Hideyoshi Hashiba	9,061	0.71	
	Nobuaki Hanaoka	2,058	0.16	
Turnout		1.290.496	73,78	▲4.21
Registered electors		1.749.030		
Social Democratic hold		Swing		
