= Hachirō =

- Gender: Male

Origin
- Origin: Japanese
- Meaning: Different meanings depending on the kanji used

Hachirō, Hachiro, Hachiroh or Hachirou (written: 八郎) is a masculine Japanese given name. Notable people with the name include:

- Hachiro Arakawa (荒川 八郎; born 1933), Japanese water polo player
- Hachirō Arita (有田 八郎; 1884–1965), Japanese politician
- Hachiro Kasuga (春日 八郎; 1924–1991), Japanese singer
- Hachiro Maekawa (前川 八郎; 1912–2010), Japanese baseball player
- Hachiro Okonogi (小此木 八郎; born 1965), Japanese politician
- Hachiro Sato (佐藤 八郎), Japanese rower
