= 2006 Kagawa gubernatorial election =

← 2002	27 August 2006	2010 →
- Turnout: 35.83 ▼0.67
Governor before election
Takeki Manabe
LDP
Elected Governor
Takeki Manabe
LDP

A gubernatorial election was held on 27 August 2006 to elect the next governor of Kagawa (石川県, Kagawa-ken), a prefecture of Japan located in the north of the Shikoku island.

Takeki Manabe of the Liberal Democratic Party (LDP) won the elections and was elected governor.

== Candidates ==
- Takeki Manabe, 66, incumbent since 1998, former public servant. He was supported by the LDP and New Komeito.
- Joji Tatara, 56, magazine editor, head of a nonprofit organization, was backed by the JCP.

== Results ==
Kagawa gubernatorial 2006
Party	Candidate	Votes	%	±%
LDP	Takeki Manabe *	190,575	65.93	▼3.65
JCP	Joji Tatara	98,493	34.07	▲7.59
Turnout		296,374	35.83	▼0.67
Total valid votes		289,068	97.54	
Registered electors		827,169		
LDP hold		Swing	31.86	
