= 2022 Kagawa gubernatorial election =

← 2018	28 August 2022	2026 →
- Turnout: 29.09 ▼0.25
Incumbent Governor
Keizo Hamada
LDP

A gubernatorial election was held on 28 August 2022 to elect the next governor of Kagawa (香川県, Kagawa-ken), a prefecture of Japan located in the north of the island of Shikoku.

Keizo Hamada, the incumbent governor since 2010 and a former Finance Ministry bureaucrat, is not seeking reelection.

== Candidates ==
- Toyohito Ikeda, backed by the LDP, Komeito, SDP and DPFP.
- Nakatani Koichi, backed by the JCP.

== Results ==
2022 Kagawa gubernatorial election
Party	Candidate	Votes	%	±%
LDP	Toyohito Ikeda	166,390	73.6	▼11.7
JCP	Nakatani Koichi	59,724	26.4	▲11.7
Turnout		232,924	29.09	▼0.25
Total valid votes		226,114	97.08	
Registered electors		800,700		
LDP hold		Swing	47.2	
