= Katsuhito =

- Gender: Male

Origin
- Origin: Japanese
- Meaning: Different meanings depending on the kanji used

Katsuhito (written: 克人, 克仁, 和人, 勝人, 勝仁 or 雄仁) is a masculine Japanese given name. Notable people with the name include:

- Katsuhito Akiyama (秋山 勝仁; born 1950), Japanese anime director and screenwriter
- Katsuhito Asano (浅野 勝人; born 1938), Japanese politician
- Katsuhito Ebisawa (蛯沢 克仁; born 1972), Japanese cross-country skier
- Katsuhito Ishii (石井 克人; born 1966), Japanese film director
- Katsuhito Iwai (岩井 克人; born 1947), Japanese economist
- Katsuhito Mizuno (水野 雄仁; born 1965), Japanese baseball player
- Katsuhito Nakazato (中里 和人; born 1956), Japanese photographer
- Katsuhito Noshi (野志 克仁; born 1967), Japanese politician
- Katsuhito Yokokume (横粂 勝仁; born 1981), Japanese politician and lawyer
