= 2018 Kagawa gubernatorial election =

← 2014	26 August 2018	2022 →
- Turnout: 29.34 ▼4.26
Governor before election
Keizo Hamada
LDP
Elected Governor
Keizo Hamada
LDP

A gubernatorial election was held on 26 August 2018 to elect the next governor of Kagawa (石川県, Kagawa-ken), a prefecture of Japan located in the north of the Shikoku island.

== Candidates ==
- Keizo Hamada, 66, incumbent since 2010, former Finance Ministry bureaucrat. He was supported by LDP, Komeito, SDP and DPFP.
- Eiji Himeda, 62, backed by JCP.

== Results ==
Kagawa gubernatorial election, 2018
Party	Candidate	Votes	%	±%
LDP	Keizo Hamada *	201,599	85.27	▲1.70
JCP	Eiji Himeda	34,814	14.73	▼1.70
Turnout		240,421	29.34	▼4.26
Total valid votes		236,413	98.33	
Registered electors		819,397		
LDP hold		Swing	70.54	
