= Iwase Dam =

Coordinates: 31°56′31″N 131°8′23″E

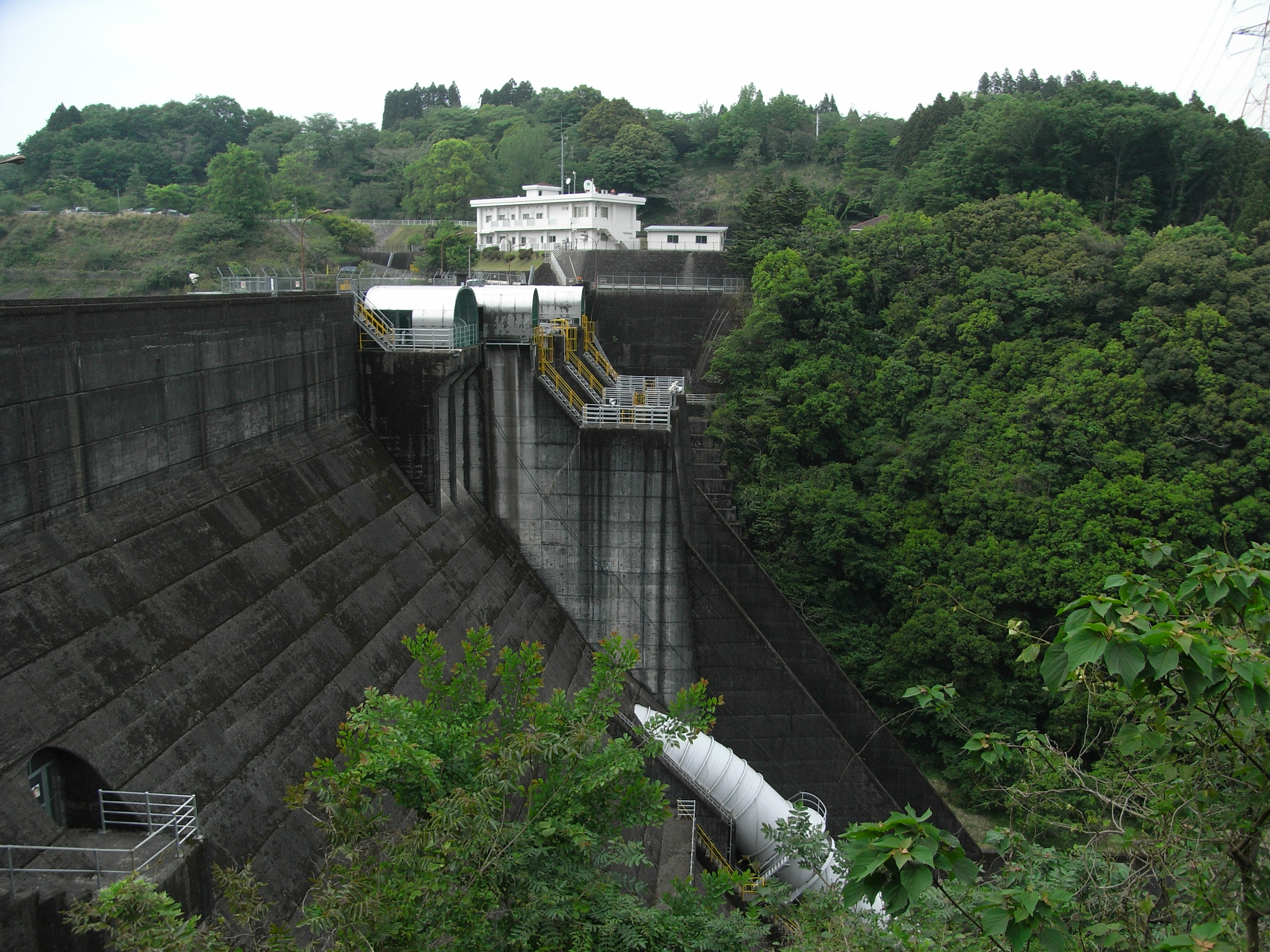
- Interactive map of Iwase Dam
- Location: Kobayashi, Miyazaki, Japan
- Construction began: 1953
- Opening date: 1967

Dam and spillways
- Height: 55.5 m (182 ft)
- Length: 155 m (509 ft)
- Dam volume: 98,000 m^{3}

Reservoir
- Total capacity: 57,000,000 m^{3}
- Catchment area: 354 km^{2}
- Surface area: 413 ha

Iwase Dam (岩瀬ダム, Iwase damu) is a dam across Iwase river in Kobayashi, Miyazaki Prefecture, Japan, completed in 1967.
