= 2010 Kagawa gubernatorial election =

← 2006	29 August 2010	2014 →
- Turnout: 36.92 ▲1.09
Governor before election
Takeki Manabe
LDP
Elected Governor
Keizo Hamada
LDP

A gubernatorial election was held on 29 August 2010 to elect the next governor of Kagawa (石川県, Kagawa-ken), a prefecture of Japan located in the north of the Shikoku island.

Takeki Manabe, 70, incumbent since 1998, former public servant, was not seeking reelection.

== Candidates ==
- Keizo Hamada, 58, finance bureaucrat. He was supported by LDP, New Komeito, DPJ and SDP.
- Akio Matsubara, 54, backed by the JCP.
- Satoko Watanabe, 56, supported by citizens movements and Midori no Mirai.

== Results ==
Kagawa gubernatorial election, 2010
Party	Candidate	Votes	%	±%
LDP	Keizo Hamada	163,583	54.87	▼11.06
Greens	Satoko Watanabe	111,646	37.45	n/a
JCP	Akio Matsubara	22,895	7.68	▼26.39
Turnout		303,390	36.92	▲1.09
Total valid votes		298,124	98.26	
Registered electors		821,791		
LDP hold		Swing	17.42	
