= 2002 Kagawa gubernatorial election =

← 1998	25 August 2002	2006 →
- Turnout: 36.50 ▼2.81
Governor before election
Takeki Manabe
LDP
Elected Governor
Takeki Manabe
LDP

A gubernatorial election was held on 25 August 2002 to elect the next governor of Kagawa (石川県, Kagawa-ken), a prefecture of Japan located in the north of the Shikoku island.

== Candidates ==
- Takeki Manabe, 62, incumbent since 1998, former public servant. He was supported by the LDP, New Komeito, NCP, and the local chapter of DPJ.
- Joji Tatara, 52, magazine editor, supported by the JCP.
- Ashufaasako Sasaki, 35, president of a design company.

== Results ==
Kagawa gubernatorial 2002
Party	Candidate	Votes	%	±%
LDP	Takeki Manabe *	203,747	69.58	▲12.83
JCP	Joji Tatara	77,527	26.48	▲8.30
	Ashufaasako Sasaki	11,541	3.94	
Turnout		300,132	36.50	▼2.81
Total valid votes		292,815	97.56	
Registered electors		822,280		
LDP hold		Swing	43.10	
