= Takaharu Station =

Railway station in Takaharu, Miyazaki Prefecture, Japan

Takaharu Station 高原駅
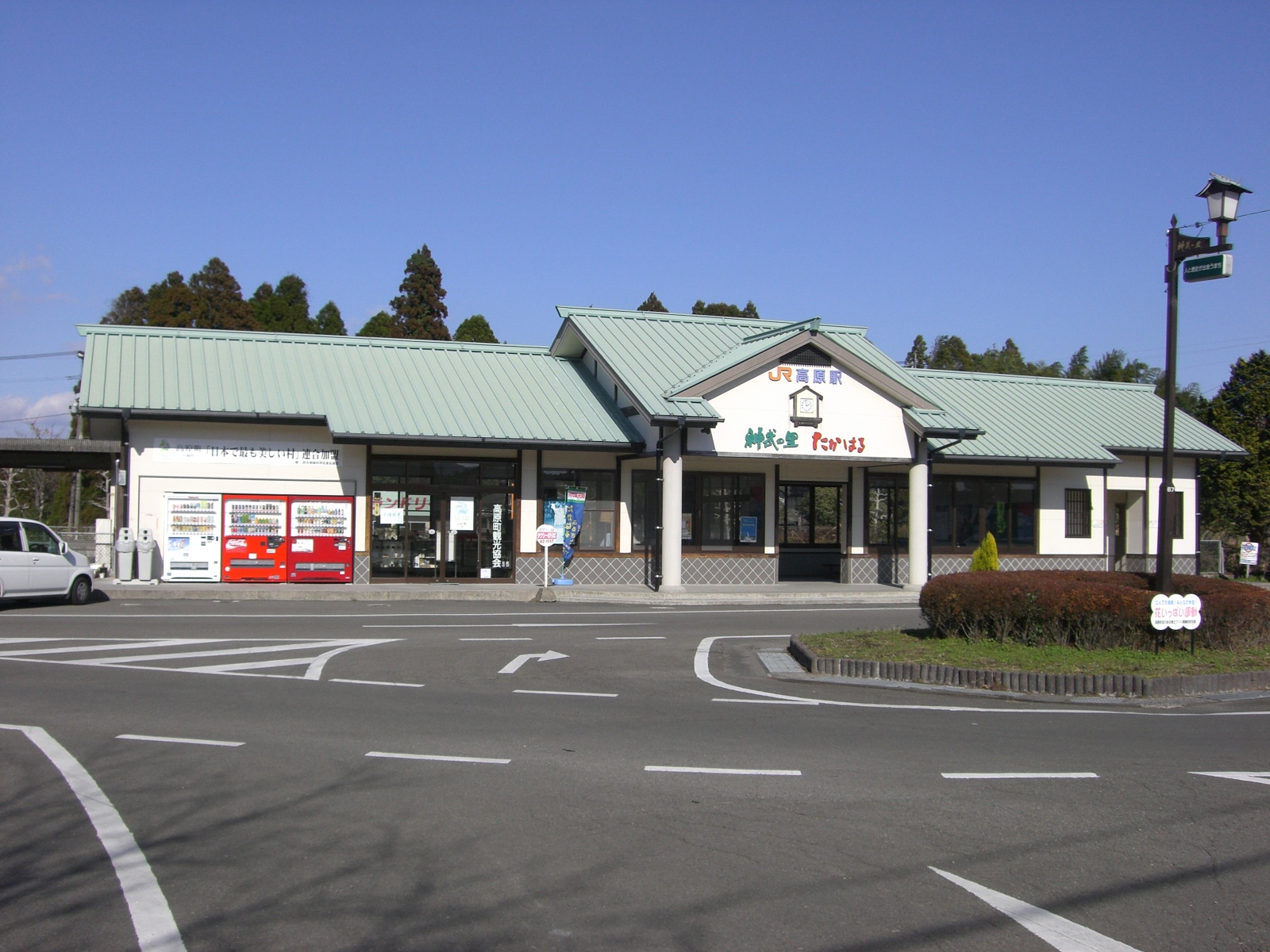
- Takaharu Station in 2008

General information
- Location: 485 Nishifumoto, Takaharu-cho, Nishimorokata-gun, Miyazaki-ken 889-4412; Japan
- Coordinates: 31°55′37″N 130°59′57″E
- Operator: JR Kyushu
- Line: ■ Kitto Line
- Distance: 26.8 from km Miyakonojō
- Platforms: 1 island platform
- Tracks: 2 + 1 siding

Construction
- Structure type: At grade
- Parking: Available at forecourt
- Accessible: Yes - level crossing and ramp to platform

Other information
- Status: Kan'i itaku agent on site
- Website: Official website

History
- Opened: 11 May 1913

Passengers
- FY2016: 94 daily

Services
Preceding station	JR Kyushu	Following station
Hirowara towards Yoshimatsu	Kitto Line	Hyūga Maeda towards Miyakonojō
Location
- Location within Miyazaki Prefecture Location within Japan

Takaharu Station (高原駅, Takaharu-eki) is a passenger railway station located in the town of Takaharu, Nishimorokata District, Miyazaki Prefecture, Japan. It is operated by JR Kyushu and is on the Kitto Line.

== Lines ==
The station is served by the Kitto Line and is located 26.8 km from the starting point of the line at Miyakonojō.

== Layout ==
The station consists of an island platform serving two tracks at grade with a siding. The station building is a wooden structure of traditional Japanese design. It houses a waiting area, a shop as well as the offices of the Takaharu Town Tourism Association. Access to the island platform is by means of a level crossing with ramps. The station is not staffed by JR Kyushu but some types of tickets are available from the tourism association which acts as a Kan'i itaku agent.

=== Platforms ===
1	■ ■ Kitto Line	for Yoshimatsu and Hayato
2	■ ■ Kitto Line	for Miyakonojō and Miyazaki

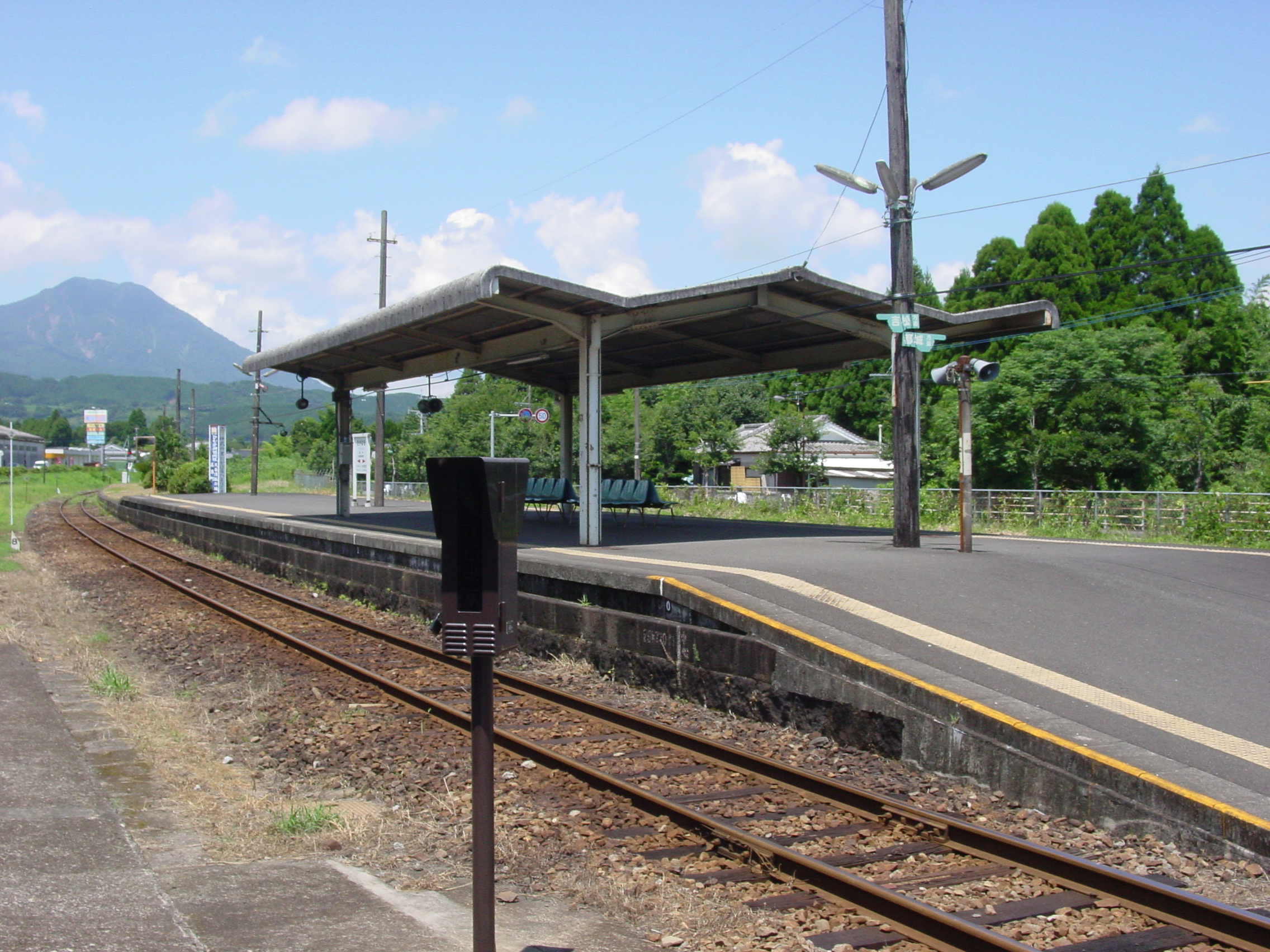
Platform

== History ==
Japanese Government Railways (JGR) opened what it then designated as the Miyazaki Line between Yoshimatsu and Kobayashi (then named Kobayashimachi) on 1 October 1912. In the second phase of expansion, the track was extended southeast to Tanigashira which opened as the eastern terminus on 11 May 1913. Takaharu opened on the same day as one of several intermediate stations on the new track. On 15 December 1923, the stretch of track between Yoshimatsu and Miyakonojō which included Takaharu, was designated as part of the Nippō Main Line. On 6 December 1932, the same stretch was separated out and was designated as the Kitto Line with Miyakonojō as the starting point. Freight service was discontinued in 1971 and baggage handling in 1984. With the privatization of Japanese National Railways (JNR), the successor of JGR, on 1 April 1987, Takaharu came under the control of JR Kyushu.

== Passenger statistics ==
In fiscal 2016, the station was used by an average of 94 passengers (boarding only) per day.

== Surrounding area ==
- Takahara Town Hall
- Takahara Town Takahara Elementary School
- Takahara Town Hospital

== See also ==
- List of railway stations in Japan
