= Akira Nakamura =

Akira Nakamura may refer to:

- Akira Nakamura (academic) (中村 粲, 1934–2010), Japanese academic
- Akira Nakamura (baseball) (中村 晃, born 1989), Japanese baseball outfielder
- Akira Nakamura (entrepreneur), 1923-2009), Japanese entrepreneur and father of Yoshiko Ishiba, wife of the prime minister of Japan, Shigeru Ishiba
- Akira Nakamura (runner) (born 1967), Japanese distance runner and competitor at the 1991 World Championships
