= Takaharu, Miyazaki =

Takaharu 高原町
- Town
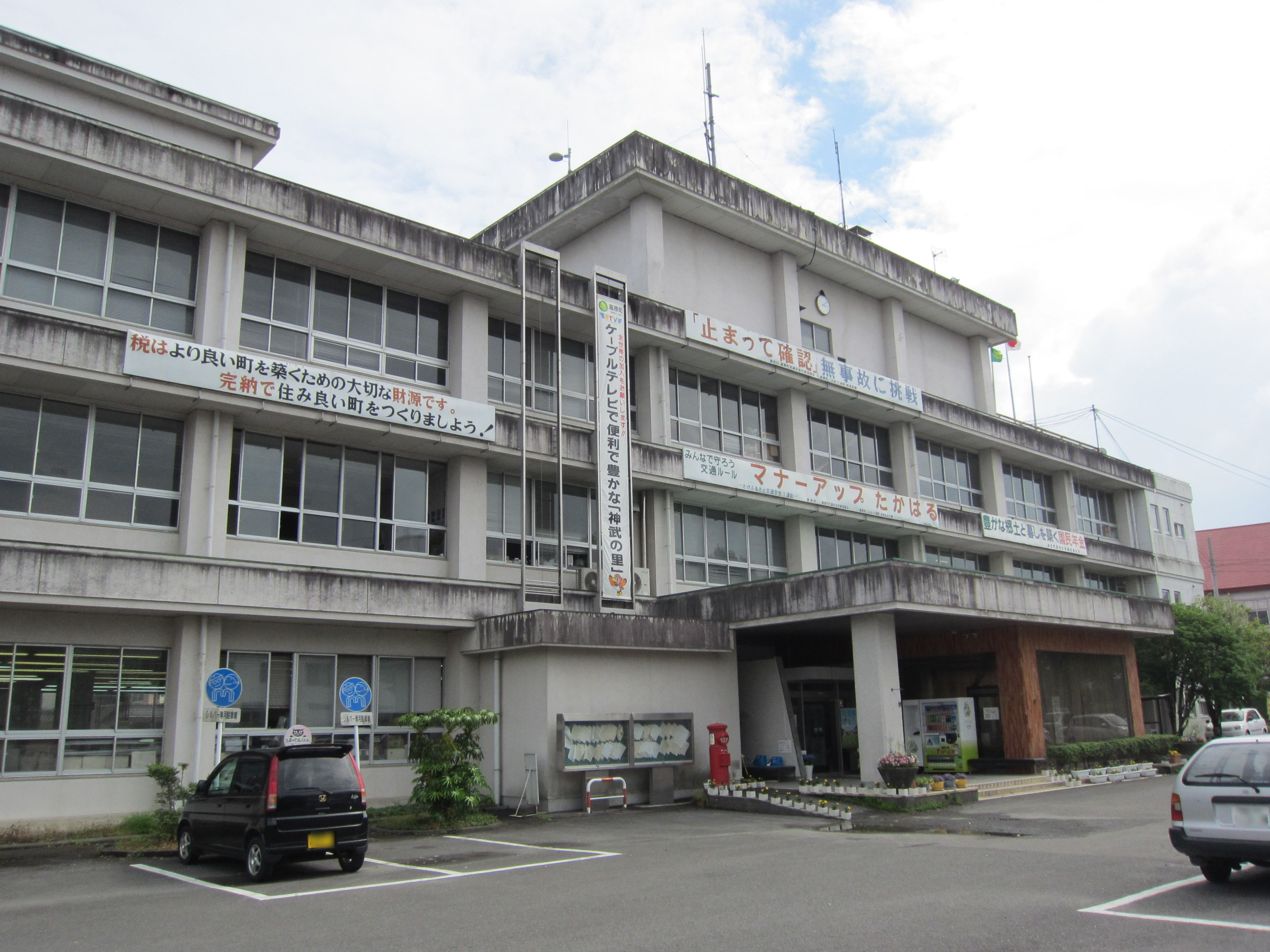
- Takaharu Town Hall

- Flag Seal
- Location of Takaharu in Miyazaki Prefecture

- Location in Japan
- Coordinates: 31°55′42″N 131°00′28″E
- Country: Japan
- Region: Kyūshū
- Prefecture: Miyazaki
- District: Nishimorokata

Government
  - Mayor: Tsunenobu Kōzuma

Area
  - Total: 85.39 km^{2} (32.97 sq mi)

Population (October 1, 2023)
  - Total: 813
  - Density: 101.3/km^{2} (262/sq mi)
- Time zone: UTC+09:00 (JST)
- Postal code: 889-4492
- Climate: Cfa
- Phone number: 0984-42-2111
- Address: 899 Nishifumoto, Takaharu-chō, Nishimorokata-gun, Miyazaki-ken
- Website: Official website
- Symbols
- Bird: Eurystomus orientalis
- Flower: Rhododendron obtusum
- Tree: Citrus tachibana

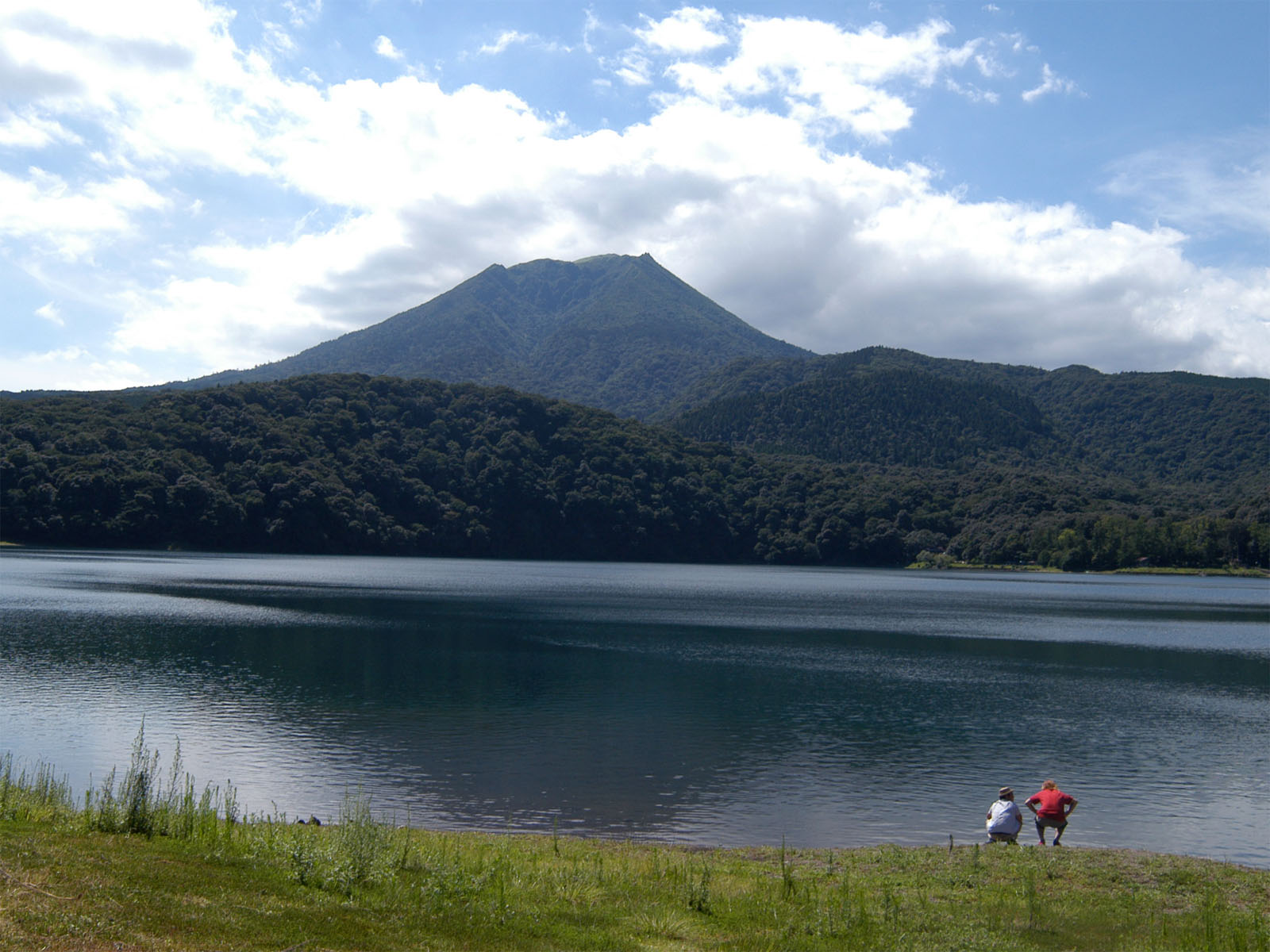
Takachiho-mine (1574 m) and Lake Miike

Takaharu (高原町, Takaharu-chō) is a town located in Nishimorokata District, Miyazaki Prefecture, Japan.

== Population ==
As of 1 November 2023, the town had an estimated population of 8137 in 3648 households, and a population density of 101.3 persons per km^{2}. The total area of the town is 85.39 km^{2} (32.97 sq mi).

== Geography ==
Takaharu is located in the southwestern part of Miyazaki Prefecture, approximately 40 kilometers west of the prefectural capital at Miyazaki City, and borders Kagoshima Prefecture on the west. Located at the foot of the Kirishima volcanic group, approximately 50% of the town area is a highland area, and the remaining 50% is a mountain forest.

=== Surrounding municipalities ===
Kagoshima Prefecture

- Kirishima

Miyazaki Prefecture

- Kobayashi
- Miyakonojō

=== Climate ===
Takaharu has a humid subtropical climate (Köppen Cfa) characterized by warm summers and cool winters with light to no snowfall. The average annual temperature in Takaharu is 15.1 °C. The average annual rainfall is 2295 mm with September as the wettest month. The temperatures are highest on average in August, at around 25.2 °C, and lowest in January, at around 4.4 °C.

== Demographics ==
Per Japanese census data, the population of Takaharu has declined in recent decades.

Historical population
| Year | Pop. | ±% |
|---|---|---|
| 1920 | 9,006 | — |
| 1930 | 10,690 | +18.7% |
| 1940 | 11,837 | +10.7% |
| 1950 | 16,144 | +36.4% |
| 1960 | 15,767 | −2.3% |
| 1970 | 12,798 | −18.8% |
| 1980 | 12,579 | −1.7% |
| 1990 | 11,984 | −4.7% |
| 2000 | 11,254 | −6.1% |
| 2010 | 10,000 | −11.1% |
| 2020 | 8,646 | −13.5% |
Takaharu population statistics

== History ==
The area of Takaharu was part of ancient Hyūga Province, and during the Edo period was completely within the borders of Satsuma Domain. In 1871, with the abolition of the han system, the area was incorporated into Kagoshima Prefecture, but was later transferred to Miyazaki Prefecture. The village Takaharu within Nishimorokata District, Miyazaki was established on May 1, 1889 with the creation of the modern municipalities system. Takaharu was raised to town status on October 5, 1934.

== Government ==
Takaharu has a mayor-council form of government with a directly elected mayor and a unicameral town council of ten members. Takaharu, collectively with the cities of Ebino and Kobayashi, contributes two members to the Miyazaki Prefectural Assembly. In terms of national politics, the town is part of the Miyazaki 1st district of the lower house of the Diet of Japan.

== Economy ==
The local economy is overwhelmingly centered on agriculture and forestry.

== Education ==
Takaharu has four public elementary schools and two public junior high schools operated by the town. The town no longer has a high school.

== Transportation ==
=== Railways ===
JR Kyushu - Kitto Line

- Hirowara - Takaharu

=== Highways ===
- Higashikyushu Expressway
- National Route 221
- National Route 223
- National Route 447

== Local attractions ==
- Lake Miike
- Tonari no Totoro Bus Stop
