= Nojiri, Miyazaki =

Town in Nishimorokata district, Miyazaki prefecture, Japan

Coordinates: 31°57′57″N 131°6′9″E

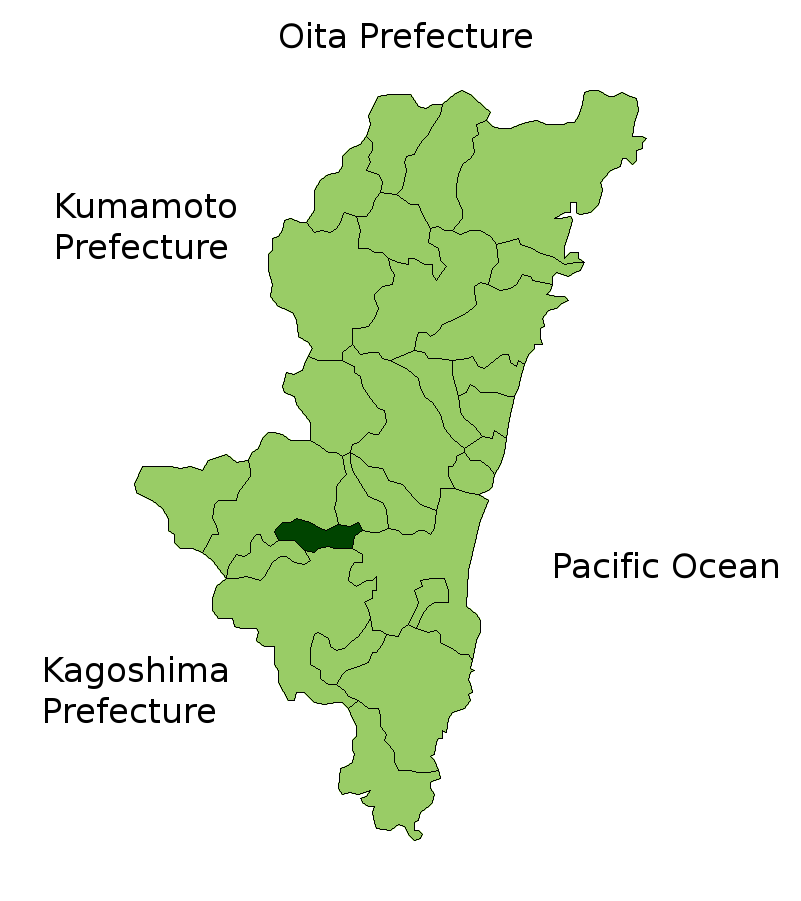
Location of Nojiri in Miyazaki

Nojiri (野尻町, Nojiri-chō) was a town located in Nishimorokata District, Miyazaki Prefecture, Japan.

As of 2003, the town had an estimated population of 8,705 and the density of 97.96 persons per km^{2}. The total area was 88.86 km^{2}.

On March 23, 2010, Nojiri was merged into the expanded city of Kobayashi and no longer exists as an independent municipality.
