= Suki, Miyazaki =

Village in Miyazaki Prefecture, Japan

Suki (須木村, Suki-son) was a village located in Nishimorokata District, Miyazaki Prefecture, Japan.

As of 2003, the village had an estimated population of 2,364 and the density of 9.71 persons per km^{2}. The total area was 243.47 km^{2}.

On March 20, 2006, Suki was merged into the expanded city of Kobayashi and no longer exists as an independent municipality.
