= Katsuhito Noshi =

Japanese politician

- 野志 克仁

Mayor of Matsuyama
- Incumbent
- Assumed office 28 November 2010
- Preceded by: Tokihiro Nakamura

Personal details
- Born: 31 July 1967 (age 59) Matsuyama, Ehime, Japan
- Party: Independent
- Education: Okayama University
- Website: www.noshik.jp

Katsuhito Noshi (野志 克仁, Noshi Katsuhito; born 31 July 1967) is a Japanese politician and the current mayor of Matsuyama, the capital city of Ehime Prefecture, Japan.
