= Moriyuki Kato =

Japanese politician (1934–2020)

- 加戸 守行

Governor of Ehime Prefecture
- In office 21 January 1999 – 11 November 2010
- Monarch: Akihito
- Preceded by: Sadayuki Iga
- Succeeded by: Tokihiro Nakamura

Personal details
- Born: 18 September 1934 Yawatahama, Ehime, Japan
- Died: 21 March 2020 (aged 85)
- Party: Independent
- Education: University of Tokyo

Moriyuki Kato (加戸 守行, Kato Moriyuki; 18 September 1934 – 21 March 2020) was a Japanese politician who served as the governor of Ehime Prefecture. He was first elected in 1999 and held the position until he was defeated by Tokihiro Nakamura in 2010. A native of Yawatahama, Ehime and graduate of the University of Tokyo, he joined the Ministry of Education in 1957. He died on 21 March 2020, aged 85.
