= 2010 Ishikawa gubernatorial election =

Japanese gubernatorial election

- 14 April 2010
- Turnout: 48.13 ▲8.03
Governor before election
Masanori Tanimoto
SDP
Elected Governor
Masanori Tanimoto
SDP

A gubernatorial election was held on 3 April 2010 to elect the next governor of Ishikawa (山口県, Ishikawa-ken), a prefecture of Japan located in the Chūbu region of Honshu island.

== Candidates ==
- Masanori Tanimoto, 64, incumbent since 1994, endorsed by SDP, Komeito, LDP, DPJ.
- Yutaka Kuwabara, 64, former DPJ lawmaker.
- Yoshinobu Kimura, 58, endorsed by JCP.
- Teruo Yonemura, 70.

== Results ==
Ishikawa gubernatorial 2010
Party	Candidate	Votes	%	±%
Social Democratic	Masanori Tanimoto *	296,628	60.94	▼15.93
Democratic	Yutaka Kuwabara	105,166	23.65	n/a
JCP	Yoshinobu Kimura	33,817	7.61	▼9.75
	Teruo Yonemura	9,056	2.04	n/a
Turnout		451.591	48,13	▲8.03
Registered electors		938,352		
Social Democratic hold		Swing	▼15.93	
