= 2010 Shiga gubernatorial election =

- 11 July 2010
- Turnout: 61.56 ▲16.62
Governor before election
Yukiko Kada
SDP
Elected Governor
Yukiko Kada
SDP

A gubernatorial election was held on 11 July 2010 to elect the next governor of Shiga (滋賀県, Shiga-ken), a prefecture of Japan located in the Kansai region of Honshu Island.

== Candidates ==
- Yukiko Kada, incumbent since 2002, 60, former Kyoto Seika University Professor. She was backed by the SDP and DPJ.
- Ken'ichirō Ueno, 44, former representative, bureaucrat in the Ministry of Internal Affairs and Communications. He was supported by the LDP and Komeito.
- Hideaki Maruoka, endorsed by JCP.

== Results ==
Shiga gubernatorial 2010
Party	Candidate	Votes	%	±%
Social Democratic	Yukiko Kada *	419,921	63.17	▲17.14
LDP	Ken'ichirō Ueno	208,707	31.40	▼7,76
JCP	Hideaki Maruoka	36,126	5.43	▼9,38
Turnout		671.414	61,56	▲16.62
Registered electors		1.090.743		
Social Democratic hold		Swing	31.77	
