= Kobayashi, Miyazaki =

Kobayashi 小林市
- City
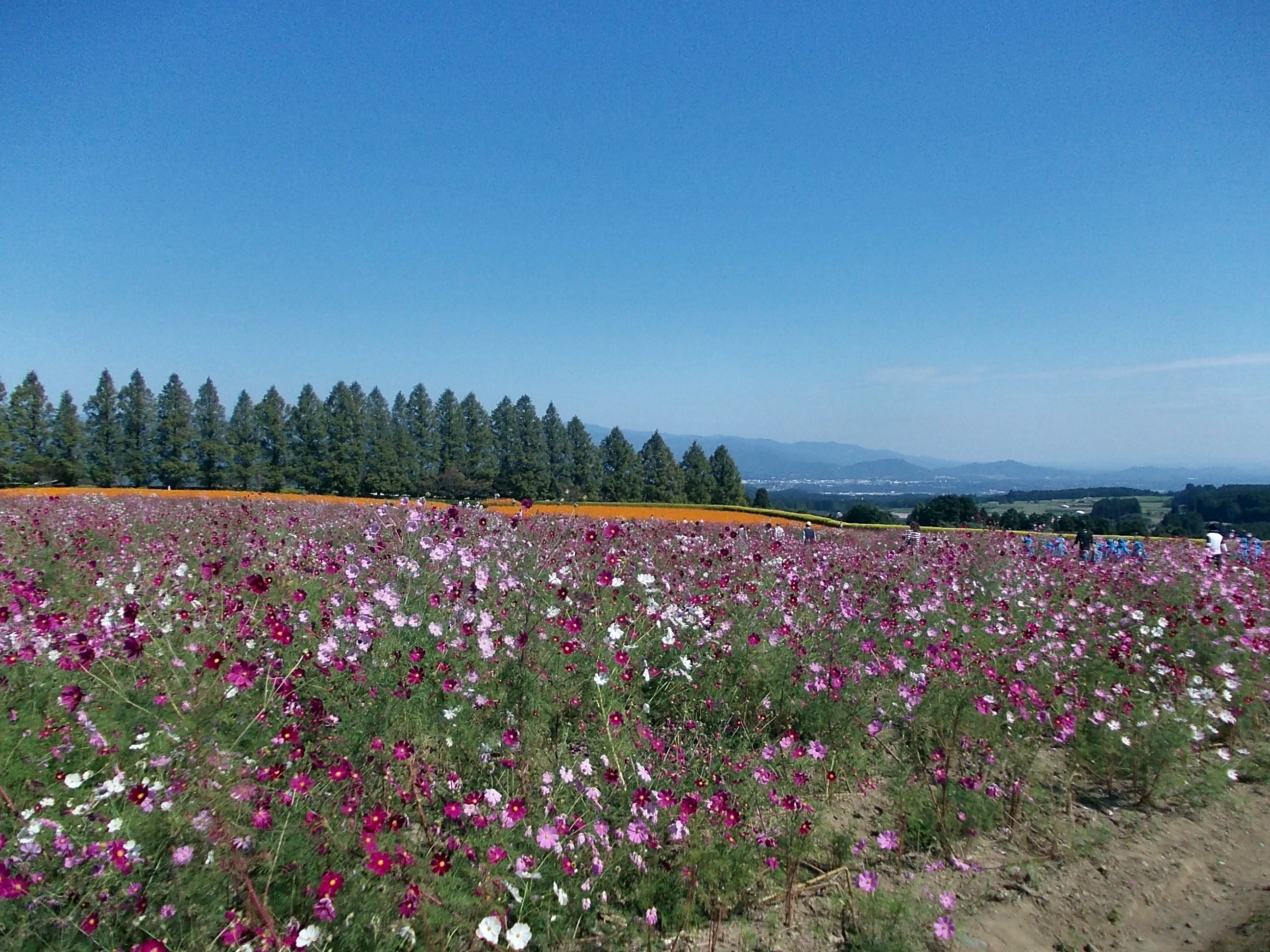
- Cosmos in Ikoma Plateau

- Flag Emblem
- Interactive map of Kobayashi
- Location in Japan
- Coordinates: 31°59′48″N 130°58′21″E
- Country: Japan
- Region: Kyushu
- Prefecture: Miyazaki
- Village settled: May 1, 1889
- Town settled: December 25, 1912
- City settled: April 1, 1950

Government
  - Mayor: Kenjirō Hori (堀研二郎) - from April 2026

Area
  - Total: 562.95 km^{2} (217.36 sq mi)

Population (May 1, 2023)
  - Total: 42,139
  - Density: 74.854/km^{2} (193.87/sq mi)
- Time zone: UTC+09:00 (JST)
- City hall address: Hosono 300, Kobayashi-shi, Miyazaki-ken 886-8501
- Climate: Cfa
- Website: Official website
- Symbols
- Bird: White-bellied green pigeon
- Flower: Cosmos
- Insect: Firefly
- Tree: Cherry blossom, Abies firma

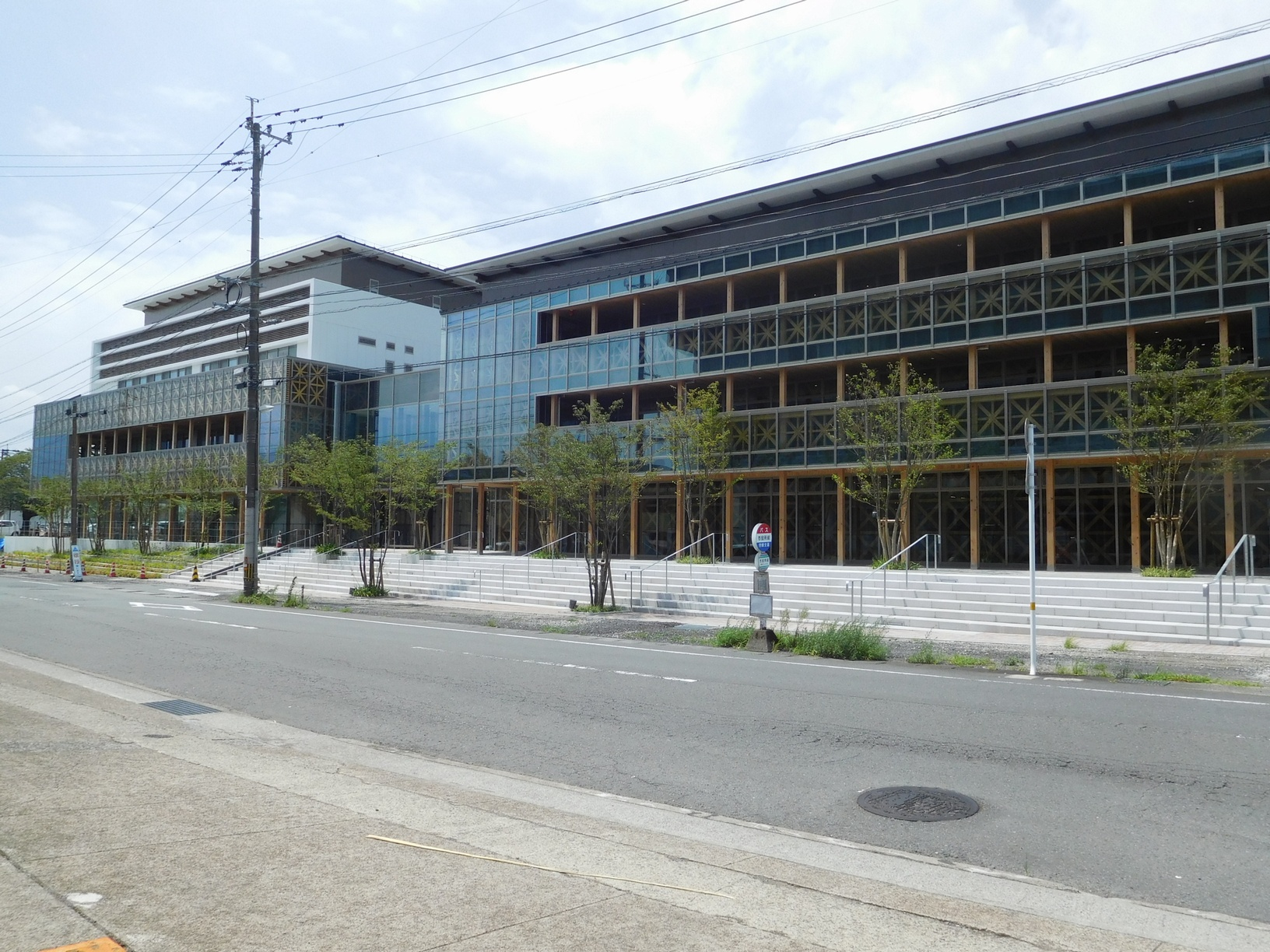
Kobayashi city hall

Kobayashi (小林市, Kobayashi-shi) is a city located in Miyazaki Prefecture, Japan. As of 1 May 2023, the city had an estimated population of 42,139 in 19144 households, and a population density of 75 persons per km^{2}. The total area of the city is 562.95 km^{2} (217.36 sq mi).

== Geography ==
Kobayashi is located in the southwestern part of Miyazaki Prefecture, about 60 kilometers west-northwest of the prefectural capital at Miyazaki. It borders Kumamoto Prefecture to the northeast, and Kagoshima Prefecture to the southwestern. Kobayashi is the largest municipality in the Nishimoro region, and as it is located almost in the center of the Nishimoro region, it plays a central role in industry and economy. The southwestern part of the city lies in the northeastern part of the Kirishima Mountain Range, including Mt. Karakuni (1,700 meters), Mt. Shinmoedake (1421 meters), Mt. Imori (1,344 meters), Mt. Nakadake (1,332 meters), Mt. Yadake (1,132 meters), and Mt. Takachiho (1,132 meters). Ohataike, a crater lake, is included in the city limits. The Ikoma Plateau (elevation 540 meters) is located at the northern foot of the Kirishima Mountain Range. In the central and southern part of the city, the Kobayashi Basin is formed by the collapse of a caldera, and the northern part of the Kobayashi Basin contains the central urban area of the city, and because of the volcanic nature of the geography, there are many hot springs. The Iwase River flows from east to west through the Kobayashi Basin.

=== Neighboring municipalities ===
Kagoshima Prefecture

- Kirishima

Kumamoto Prefecture

- Asagiri
- Taragi

Miyazaki Prefecture

- Aya
- Ebino
- Miyakonojō
- Miyazaki
- Nishimera
- Takaharu

=== Climate ===
Kobayashi has a humid subtropical climate (Köppen climate classification Cfa) with hot, humid summers and cool winters. The average annual temperature in Kobayashi is 16.3 °C (61.3 °F). The average annual rainfall is 2,774.1 mm (109.22 in) with June as the wettest month. The temperatures are highest on average in August, at around 26.4 °C (79.5 °F), and lowest in January, at around 5.8 °C (42.4 °F). The highest temperature ever recorded in Kobayashi was 39.0 °C (102.2 °F) on 2 August 2026; the coldest temperature ever recorded was −8.7 °C (16.3 °F) on 25 January 2016.

Climate data for Kobayashi (2000−2020 normals, extremes 2000−present)
| Month | Jan | Feb | Mar | Apr | May | Jun | Jul | Aug | Sep | Oct | Nov | Dec | Year |
|---|---|---|---|---|---|---|---|---|---|---|---|---|---|
| Record high °C (°F) | 22.5 (72.5) | 23.0 (73.4) | 26.5 (79.7) | 30.0 (86.0) | 33.6 (92.5) | 34.8 (94.6) | 37.9 (100.2) | 39.0 (102.2) | 35.9 (96.6) | 33.2 (91.8) | 28.2 (82.8) | 22.6 (72.7) | 39.0 (102.2) |
| Mean daily maximum °C (°F) | 10.5 (50.9) | 12.7 (54.9) | 16.0 (60.8) | 20.9 (69.6) | 24.9 (76.8) | 26.5 (79.7) | 31.0 (87.8) | 31.7 (89.1) | 28.7 (83.7) | 24.0 (75.2) | 18.2 (64.8) | 12.5 (54.5) | 21.5 (70.7) |
| Daily mean °C (°F) | 5.8 (42.4) | 7.4 (45.3) | 10.3 (50.5) | 15.0 (59.0) | 19.3 (66.7) | 22.1 (71.8) | 26.0 (78.8) | 26.4 (79.5) | 23.6 (74.5) | 18.8 (65.8) | 13.2 (55.8) | 7.7 (45.9) | 16.3 (61.3) |
| Mean daily minimum °C (°F) | 1.7 (35.1) | 2.8 (37.0) | 5.2 (41.4) | 9.8 (49.6) | 14.6 (58.3) | 18.6 (65.5) | 22.5 (72.5) | 22.9 (73.2) | 19.9 (67.8) | 14.4 (57.9) | 8.7 (47.7) | 3.5 (38.3) | 12.0 (53.7) |
| Record low °C (°F) | −8.7 (16.3) | −6.9 (19.6) | −2.8 (27.0) | −0.8 (30.6) | 4.9 (40.8) | 11.4 (52.5) | 16.6 (61.9) | 17.3 (63.1) | 10.9 (51.6) | 4.2 (39.6) | −0.9 (30.4) | −4.2 (24.4) | −8.7 (16.3) |
| Average precipitation mm (inches) | 77.1 (3.04) | 132.7 (5.22) | 165.2 (6.50) | 182.3 (7.18) | 226.5 (8.92) | 606.7 (23.89) | 473.8 (18.65) | 256.6 (10.10) | 306.1 (12.05) | 136.9 (5.39) | 110.7 (4.36) | 99.8 (3.93) | 2,774.1 (109.22) |
| Average precipitation days (≥ 1.0 mm) | 7.5 | 9.7 | 11.0 | 10.4 | 10.1 | 16.9 | 14.8 | 12.6 | 12.6 | 8.1 | 8.4 | 7.3 | 129.4 |
| Mean monthly sunshine hours | 162.2 | 156.1 | 194.2 | 187.9 | 178.9 | 110.0 | 175.3 | 186.5 | 155.0 | 175.7 | 155.9 | 157.7 | 1,999.8 |
Source: Japan Meteorological Agency

=== Demographics ===
Per Japanese census data, the population of Kobayashi in 2020 is 43,670 people. Kobayashi has been conducting censuses since 1920.

Historical population

| Year | Pop. | ±% |
|---|---|---|
| 1920 | 33,489 | — |
| 1925 | 35,913 | +7.2% |
| 1930 | 40,144 | +11.8% |
| 1935 | 42,065 | +4.8% |
| 1940 | 43,332 | +3.0% |
| 1945 | 56,459 | +30.3% |
| 1950 | 59,664 | +5.7% |
| 1955 | 63,686 | +6.7% |
| 1960 | 62,505 | −1.9% |
| 1965 | 58,298 | −6.7% |
| 1970 | 52,415 | −10.1% |

| Year | Pop. | ±% |
|---|---|---|
| 1975 | 51,037 | −2.6% |
| 1980 | 52,762 | +3.4% |
| 1985 | 53,753 | +1.9% |
| 1990 | 53,480 | −0.5% |
| 1995 | 52,828 | −1.2% |
| 2000 | 51,697 | −2.1% |
| 2005 | 49,820 | −3.6% |
| 2010 | 48,294 | −3.1% |
| 2015 | 46,221 | −4.3% |
| 2020 | 43,670 | −5.5% |

Kobayashi population statistics

== History ==
The area of Kobayashi was part of ancient Hyūga Province and was called "Hinamori" (夷守) in the Nara period as it was the location of a military settlement on the frontier of the Yamato Kingdom against the Hayato people further south. Miyama Castle was completed around the time of the Genpei War at the end of the Heian period, and the area came to be called "Miyama". In the Sengoku period, after considerable turmoil, the area came under the control of the Itō clan. The Itō were defeated by the Shimazu clan of Satsuma Province in 1572, who established a stronghold at Kobayashi Castle. The jōkamachi which developed around this castle became the core of modern Kobayashi. The Shimazu continued to rule the area as part of Satsuma Domain to the end of the Edo Period. In 1871, with the abolition of the han system, the area was incorporated into Kagoshima Prefecture, but was later transferred to Miyazaki Prefecture. The village of Kobayashi was established on May 1, 1889, with the creation of the modern municipalities system. It was raised to town status on December 25, 1912, and to city status on April 1, 1950.

On March 20, 2006, the village of Suki (from Nishimorokata District) was merged into Kobayashi, roughly doubling the city's size.

On March 23, 2010, the town of Nojiri (also from Nishimorokata District) was also merged into Kobayashi.

== Government ==
Kobayashi has a mayor-council form of government with a directly elected mayor and a unicameral city council of 19 members. Kobayashi, together with the town of Takaharu, contributes two members to the Miyazaki Prefectural Assembly. In terms of national politics, the city is part of the Miyazaki 1st district of the lower house of the Diet of Japan.

== Economy ==
The economy of Kobayashi is based on agriculture and forestry, as well as seasonal tourism. Kobayashi is famous for producing pears.

== Education ==
Kobayashi has 14 public elementary schools and ten public junior high schools operated by the city, and two public high schools operated by the Miyazaki Prefectural Board of Education. There is also one private high school.

== Transportation ==
=== Railways ===
JR Kyushu - Kitto Line

- Nishi Kobayashi - Kobayashi

=== Highways ===
- Higashikyushu Expressway
- National Route 221
- National Route 265
- National Route 268

== Local attractions ==
Inyoseki
A fertility shrine a which people pray to conceive children. The site has a natural rock formation that resembles a phallus.

Ikoma Plateau
At an elevation of 540 m (1,770 ft), the plateau offers a view of the city from its magnificent flower garden with the Kirishima Mountain Range at its back. October is Cosmos season while April/May feature Icelandic poppies.

Idenoyama Park
Home of the Firefly Festival every May. Features a freshwater aquarium, restaurants specializing in carp dishes, and beautiful lakefront scenery.

Idenoyama Spring Water (Japan's 100 remarkable waters)

Idenoyama mountain freshwater fish aquarium

Idenoyama Park is located in south west from center of Kobayashi city. This park has a pond where the water source is from Idenoyama mountain, and its spring water is selected as Japan's 100 remarkable waters. This is the home place of the Firefly Festival every May. Features a freshwater aquarium, restaurants specializing in carp dishes, and a beautiful lakefront scenery.

Overview of Idenoyama Park

One of the spring waters of the Kirishima Mountains, abundant water flow of 1 ton per second flows into the largest reservoir in Kobayashi, Idenoyama Pond. Idenoyama Pond was created by the Satsuma Domain in 1614 for irrigation water, and around this area a large number of flora and fauna inhabit. In late May to early June, it is a great habitat of Genji fireflies. There is a promenade so you can walk by the pond and enjoy the fireflies dancing. At the adjacent Miyazaki Prefectural Fisheries Experimental Station Kobayashi Branch, sturgeon has been successfully hatched using spring water, and its caviar has been commercialized in cooperation with the private sector. There is a restaurant where you can taste river fish such as carp, trout, and sturgeon.

Mythology

The inhabitants, who lived in the mountains of Kuma-gun in Higo, Kurino, Yokokawa, Hyokiyama, and Soo-gun in Osumi, defeated the court and did not donate their annual tribute to the court. Emperor Keiko visited the Kyushu region to subdue them. He departed from Kyoto, passed through Nagato and Toyokuni, then at Hyuga, he established Takaya-no-miya (near Saito) to fight the Kumaso. On his way back to Kyoto, he stopped by Hinamori, nearby Kobayashi city. At that time, the hills surrounding the Mt. Idenoyama were said to have housed the royal family, and there was a beautiful lady called Izumihime. Izumihime poured tea made with the spring water from Idenoyama to the Emperor. The cup of tea made him comforted and healed the tiredness of the battle. The emperor and Izumihime grew warm affection one day. The time of return came and the Emperor departed for Kyoto. It is said that she mourned herself in the pond and turned into a snake as a guardian angel. Even now, the Benzaiten Festival is held every April to celebrate Mizugami-sama, and there is still a stone that is connected to the grave of Izumihime next to the cemetery in Oidemizu district. Excerpt of the legendary "Izumihime Monogatari"

Inyoseki Rock

Inyoseki is a couple rock in the Homanose river which is located in east part of Kobayashi city. You can find them in the downstream of Sannomiyakyo Gorge. The volcanic activity that was activated about 1.8 million years ago, deposited a large amount of volcanic ash and lava, which was formed by erosion by rivers. There is a 17.5-meter-high phallic-shaped yang stone (male stone), and beside it is a 5.5-meter-periphery-shaped gylinite (female stone). Since ancient times, it has been worshiped as the god of marriage, child treasure and prayer for safe delivery. However, it became widely known as a sightseeing spot after a new road was constructed in 1917 (until then, there was no other way to the ridge). In 1950, Kobayashi Municipal "Hamanoseso Ryokan" was opened, and since then, the "Inyoseki Festival" is held every September. In April 1929, Noguchi Ujo, a poet, visited this Inyoseki and composed a poem, which is on a monument erected in 1951.

Kirishima Mountain

Kirishimayama Mountain is a collective term for volcanic groups near the border between Miyazaki and Kagoshima prefectures in southern Kyushu. Also called Kirishima Volcanoes, they form a mountain mass between and around the highest peak of Karakuni-dake (1,700m above sea level) and the sacred peak of Takachiho-no-Mine (1,574m above sea level). It is an active volcano that repeats eruptions since its history was recorded (volcanic activation is ranked B by the Japan Meteorological Agency), and active volcanic activity has continued particularly at Shinmoe-dake and Ohachi. Those mountains have been selected as volcanoes that need to be monitored and an observation system for volcanic disaster prevention by the Volcanic Eruption Prediction Council has been established.

History

According to the Kojiki, this mountain was the place of Tenson-korin; a couple of gods, Izanagi (male) and Izanami (female) descended from Takama-no-Hara, heaven, to Takachiho-no-Mine. There is a halberd placed upside down on the peak of Takachiho-no-Mine, this is called Ama-no-Sakahoko, or the halberd of the heaven. It is said, that Izanagi-no-Mikoto and Izanami-no-Mikoto placed the Ama-no-Sakahoko on the peak of Takachiho-no-Mine, and mixed the earth to create the country. The origin of "Kirishima" is based on the theory that, if you look into this area from afar, Kirishima Mountain range looks like an island floating in the sea of fog. Or, it is said that when the Tenson-Korin, the fog was very thick and they could hardly see surroundings. As soon as they sowed the rice ears brought from Takama-no-Hara, the fog soon cleared. Or, there is also a theory that the volcanic plume was regarded as fog.

Folklore

People say that a hermit lives in the Kirishima. Below are The Seven Wonders of Kirishima:

1. Makazu-no-Tane, or seeds without sowing rice may grow on the mountains. This is attributed to the species brought from Takama-no-Hara, or heaven, when the Tenson-Korin; two gods descendant to Kirishima mountain in ancient times.
2. Moji Iwa, or character rock on the west side of Kirishima Shrine, there is a large rock of 10 cubic meters. You will find some Sanskrit characters are engraved on the inside despite the small gaps that are difficult to reach.
3. Kame Ishi, or turtle rock on the old approach to Kirishima Shrine, there is a rock that looks exactly like a turtle. It is said, that a turtle that has broken his promise to God and was then turned into a rock.
4. Kazaana, or wind hole. There is a rock with a hole where the wind blows out on the old approach to Kirishima Shrine.
5. Mitarashigawa, or Mitarashi river. A river that dries out in winter and a lot of water comes out around May. It is said, that it contains the water of Manai brought from Takama-no-Hara when Tenson-Korin, or when the gods descended.
6. Ryodogawa, or Ryodo river. A river that flows only from June to September. The river flows twice at intervals of several days and is called the Ryodo, meaning twice river.
7. Kagura at midnight. When Kirishima Jingu was relocated to its current location, many people are said to have heard Kagura, sounds that should not be heard at midnight. Originally, Kagura involved songs and dances that were dedicated to the deities.

Ito-zuka

Ito Yoshisuke was a daimyo who ruled most of the Himuka-no-Kuni. On May 3, 1572, he with around 3,000 troops attacked Kakuto Castle, protected by Shimadzu's vassal, Kawakami Tadatomo, from Minoyama (Kobayashi), the front base. However, the Ito army retreats to Kizakibaru (Iino, Ebino-city) once after unexpected resistance. When Shimazu Yoshihiro, who had been waiting for the Ito army at Iino Castle, received the report, he immediately sent his troops to Kizakibaru, and on May 4, the troops went into a fierce battle. The battle ended with a major victory for Shimadzu, and the defeated Ito quickly declined, and Shimadzu began to rule over Himuka-no-Kuni. This is The Battle of Kizakibaru, which was later called "The Battle of Okehazama" in Kyushu.

[The Battle of Okehazama took place in Nagoya, Aichi in 1560. It is a historic upheaval battle in which only 3,000 Oda Nobunaga troops defeated 45,000 Imagawa Yoshimoto troops. By this battle, Oda made his name known throughout the country.] Of the more than 500 Ito troops who died in the battle of Kizakibaru, more than 200 main ones, such as General Ito Kagamori/Sukeyasu, were buried in Magata-Inba-Zuka, and this tomb was later called Ito-zuka. They are just memorial towers, there are no bodies under them. The descendants of Shimazu warlord Godai Tomoyasu/Shozaemon built a five-story pagoda to comfort the spirits of Ito troops, and in 1817, the lord of Kobayashi built a monument and engraved the sentence "Look at the old days of today". The mound is a historic site designated by Miyazaki prefecture. Location; 160-2 Magata, Kobayashi, Miyazaki (located on a hill behind Kobayashi High School)

Kobayashi Castle

Kobayashi Castle was a castle on a hill in the plains. It is also known as Mitsuyama Castle or Minoyama Castle. Currently, Shiroyama Park.

In 1566, Ito Yoshisuke commanded Mera Shigekata, the lord of Suki castle, to build a castle to defend against the Shimazu, the daimyo of Satsuma and as a front-line base for the Iino Castle attack. The Iwase river (now Ishigori river) surrounds the west, north and east of this Kobayashi castle, forming like a natural moat, and the southern part faces cliffs of shirasu soil, which is volcanic ash soil making it difficult to climb. The Kobayashi castle was protected by the natural hazards that cannot be easily reached to the castle. At first it was called Mitsuyama Castle or Minoyama Castle, however there was another castle called the same for Kitahara, so Ito's castle was renamed Kobayashi Castle since it was in Kobayashi Village. At present, it is a privately owned land. There are markers, such as the indicator of the Honmaru, the main bailey, but most of part is covered with grove of mixed trees.

Suki Castle

Suki Castle was one of the Forty-eight Castles of Ito on a hill in the plains. It is also known as Tsurumaru Castle. Currently, Shiroyama Park nearby Sukimuland.

Suki Castle is a collective term. It has Hidaki castle at the foot, Araki castle on the middle, then Matsuo / Tsurumaru castle at the summit as a Honmaru, the main bailey. Matsuo Castle is surrounded by cliffs and only a part of the southwest is a steep slope. At present there are markers that mark the spots of the castle.

Nojiri Castle

Nojiri Castle is one of the Forty-eight Castles of Ito on a hill in the plains. It is located in Kobayashi city, former Nojiri Town.

The Castle is surrounded by the Jonoshita river and a cliff, which forms a natural barrier. Initially, it was thought that the castle had Honmaru, the main bailey, in the west and Ninomaru, the second bailey, in the east, but later investigation revealed those were opposite. The Nojiri Honjo, Honmaru, was at the east and the Nojiri Shinjo, Ninomaru, which was later built in the west. So, this castle was actually a paired castle. Currently it is a farmland, but only the remains on the Nojiri Shinjo side. This well is a Cultural Property designated by Nojiri Town.

Kayumochida the Old Battlefield Ruins

In 1572, the troops of Ito were chased by their enemy Shimadzu at the Kizakibaru-no-Tatakai, or the battle of Kizakibaru. The best spearman, Yunokizaki Tango-no-Kami (Masaie) boldly turned back, and had a one on one fight against Shimazu Hyogo-no-Kami (Yoshihiro). At the moment when Masaie made a deadly blow to Yoshihiro, the spear missed the target because Yoshihiro's horse broke its front knee. During that time Masaie was surrounded and killed by Shimadzu.

They say that the place where this one on one battle took place is today's Kayumochida area. The tomb of Yunokizaki Tango-no-Kami remains in the northwest, and a stone monument was built in honor of the martial arts, and is still carefully protected. Kayumochida the Old Battlefield Ruins is where is designated by Kobayashi city.

The Tomb of Ijuin Tadasane

Ijuin Tadasane was a warlord, serving Shimadzu like his father, Ijuin Tadamune. In 1597, Toyotomi Hideyoshi commanded the invasion to Korea. Father and son, Ijuin Tadasane, went to war as the Shimadzu troops. In 1598 in the Shisen-no-Tatakai, the Battle at Shisen, it is said that 7,000 of Shimadzu troops defeated 37,000 Korean troops. Since then the name of Shimadzu was feared through Korea, even China.

However, in 1599, Ijuin Tadamune, the father was killed by Shimadzu Tadatsune because the father was too proud of his power. The son, Ijuin Tadasane was standing in his castle, Tsuno Castle, and decided to break ranks with Shimadzu. This is called Shonai-no-Ran, the Shonai Rebellion. He surrendered the next year, but in 1602, he was killed by Shimadzu Tadatsune on the way to Kyoto. According to Professor Yamamoto from Historiographical Institute at the University of Tokyo, for Shimadzu, there was no choice to kill his vassals, Ijuin Tadasane, who was a key person of opposition. Here in his tomb, there is a memorial tower, which was built for Ijuin Tadasane.

Tomb of Mera Chikugo-no-Kami

Mera Shigekata was a warlord, serving Ito, the Daimyo of Himuka-no-Kuni, and Shigekata also was the lord of Suki Castle. Mera Shigekata was ordered to build Kobayashi castle by Ito, this castle was by the border of neighboring state, Satsuma. In 1566, Shimadzu troops attacked Kobayashi castle, which was under construction, Shigekata fought with his younger brother, Noriyuki. Shigekata injured one of the key warlords, Yoshihiro, and made the Shimadzu troops retreat. In 1568, Shigekata who was as the representative of Ito and Hongo who was from Shimadzu sat down in post-war negotiations in Obi. Shigekata achieved pledging two things, Shimadzu troops retreating and ceding of Obi territory. Since then Shigekata was known as a man with great intelligence and bravery. In 1572, at the Kizakibaru-no-Tatakai, or the Battle of Kizakibaru, Shigekata fought with Ito where he died. Shegekata's head was sent to Ichirinji Temple, which was his family temple. There is a five-story pagoda which is engraved the word, which says "Ryushitsukuko". They say that this pagoda is the one for Mera Shigekata, who was also known as Chikugo-no-Kami.

Tomb of Yunokizaki Tango-no-Kami

Yunokizaki Masaie was a warlord, serving Ito, the Daimyo of Himuka-no-Kuni, and Mas the load of Yunokizaki Castle. Masaie was a master of spears and was declared as "the best spear-man in Nisshu (Himuka-no-Kuni)."

In 1572, he joined the Kizakibaru-no-Tatakai, or the Battle of Kizakibaru. However, his general Ito was routed because of the trap called "Tsuri-no-Buse" by their enemy, Shimadzu. Tsuri-no-Buse were tactics in a field battle. The entire army is divided into three squads, two of which are hide or lay down and wait ( meaning buse) to the two different sides in advance, then the left squad attacks ( meaning tsuri) pretending to be defeated. The best spearman, Masaie boldly turned back, and was one on one fight against Shimazu Hyogo-no-Kami (Yoshihiro). At the moment when Masaie made a deadly blow to Yoshihiro, the spear missed the target because Yoshihiro's horse broke its front knee. During that time Masaie was surrounded and killed by Shimadzu. They say that the place where this one on one battle took place is today's Kayumochida area. The tomb of Yunokizaki Tango-no-Kami remains in the northwest, and a stone monument was built in honor of the martial arts, and is still carefully protected. The tomb is located slightly off Kayumochida the Old Battlefield Ruins, which is designated by Kobayashi city.

Sannomiya Gorge
Featuring a cliff which is 32 m (105 ft) high and stretching 60 m (200 ft) wide.

Suki Suspension Bridge and Mamako Falls
Crossing the bridge leads to a view of this waterfall cluster. The falls are named after a legend which tells of a cruel stepmother who took her six-year-old stepdaughter to the falls to murder her. However, the child had tied their sashes together without the stepmother realizing, and when the stepmother pushed the girl over, they both fell to their deaths.

== Culture ==
=== Festivals ===
Sakura Festival: Late March-Early April. Features flower viewing and local events in locations all over Kobayashi.

Firefly Festival at Idenoyama Park: Late May-Late June

Water Festival: First Saturday of August

Suki City Fireforks Festival: Mid-August

Suki Chestnut Festival: Late September

Inyoseki Festival: Late September

Harvest Festival: Early November

Autumn Festival: Late November

Winter Festival: Late November/Early December. Features annual Christmas Lights Display at Kobayashi Station. The lights were designed by students of the local technical school, now Kobayashi Shuho High School.

== Notable people from Kobayashi ==
- Toshifumi Kosehira, politician
- Teiichiro Morinaga, governor of the Bank of Japan
- Keiko Saito, actress
