= Iwase (surname) =

Iwase (written: 岩瀬 lit. "rock shoal") is a Japanese surname. Notable people with the surname include:

- Go Iwase (磐瀬 剛; born 1995), Japanese footballer
- Hitoki Iwase (born 1974), baseball player
- Ken Iwase (born 1975), football player
- Randy Iwase (born 1947), politician
- Yoji Iwase (岩瀬 洋志; born 2004), Japanese actor
