= Lake Miike =

Lake in Japan

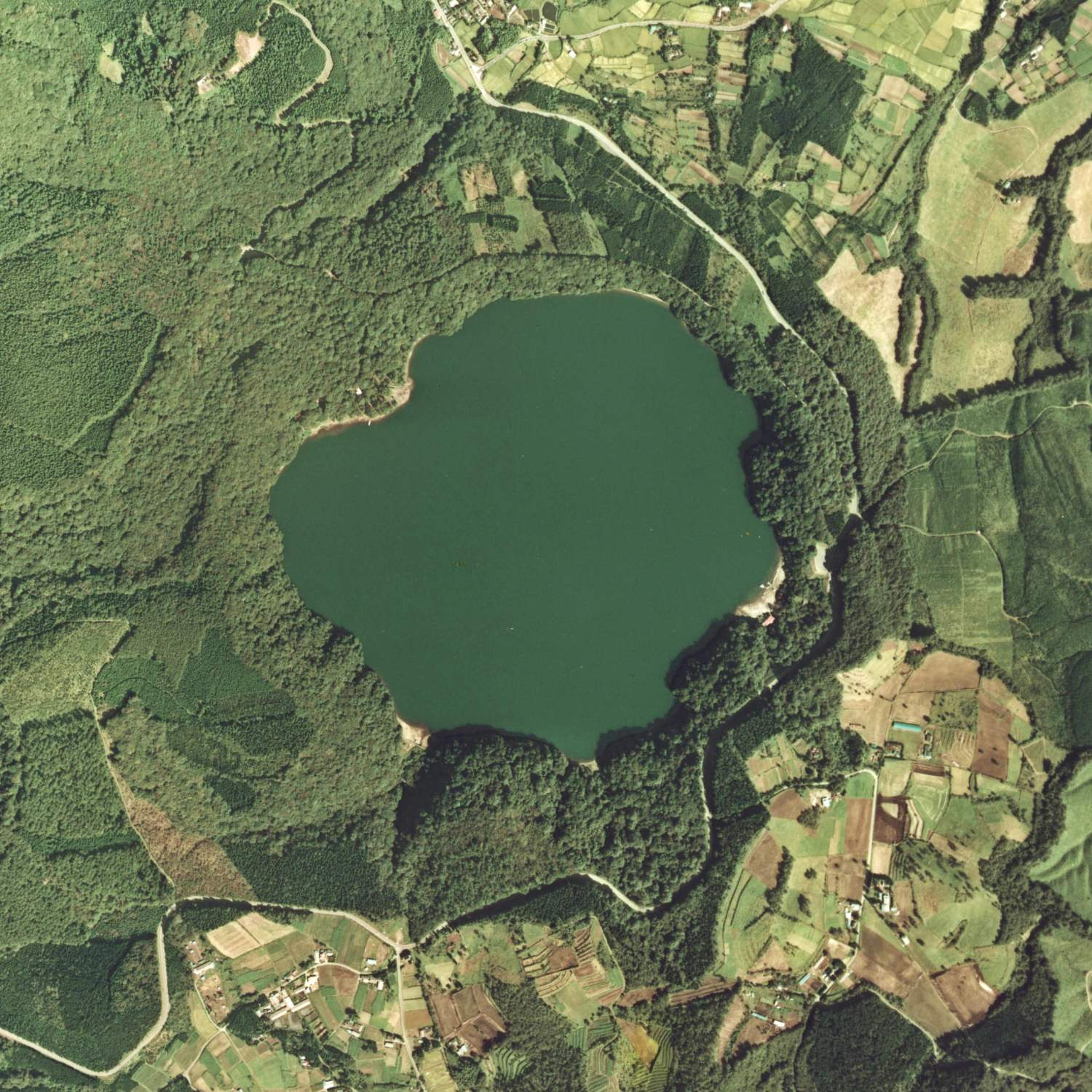

- Location within Japan
- Location: Miyazaki Prefecture
- Coordinates: 31°53′0″N 130°58′10″E
- Basin countries: Japan
- Surface area: 72 ha (180 acres)
- Max. depth: 103 m (338 ft)
- Surface elevation: 305 m (1,001 ft)

Lake Miike (御池, Miike) is a lake in Miyakonojō and Takaharu in Miyazaki Prefecture, Japan.

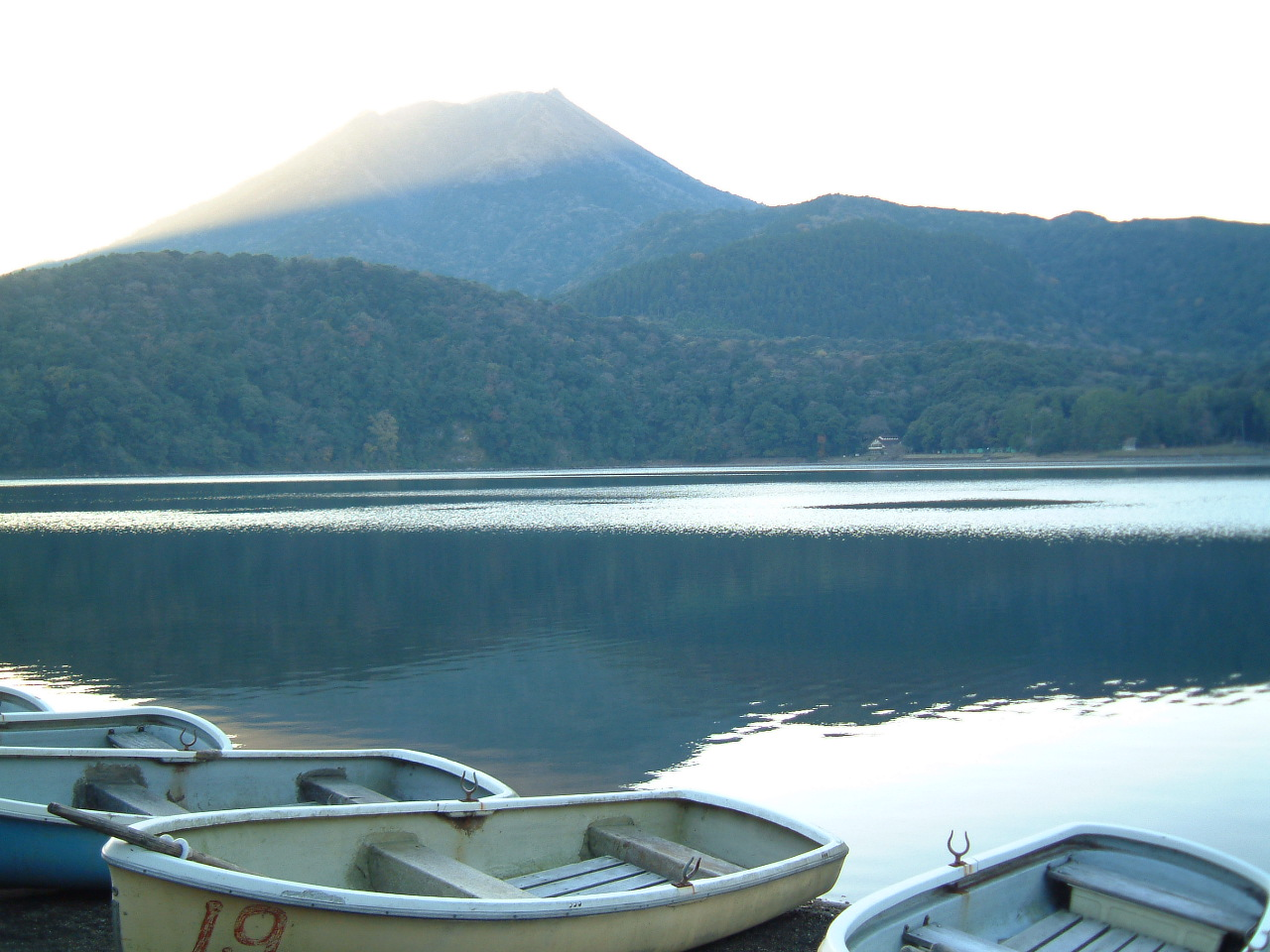
Lake Miike

== Geography and geology ==
The height above sea level is 305 m, the depth 93.5 meters, the deepest in Japan as the crater lake. There is no outflow of water from the lake. The lake is encircled by forests, and there is a park called Miike Yacho(Birds) no Mori and a camp site. Waterfowls such as mandarin ducks, teals, spectacled teals are seen. The lake was created by a crater resulting from a magma vapor eruption about 4200 years ago. Flatstones are seen in the layers of ground near by, called Miike floatstones or Miike bora.

== History ==
Along the border of the lake, there was mythologically 7 ports, and Emperor Jinmu was said to play in the neighborhood of one of the ports, Oojikou. Seiku shonin, a holy priest who was said to build Kirishima Higashi Shrine trained himself homa. After the WW2, weapons and tanks were thrown into the lake.
