= Keiko Hasegawa =

Japanese speed skater (born 1955)

Personal information
- Nationality: Japanese
- Born: 21 September 1955 (age 70) Hokkaido, Japan

Sport
- Sport: Speed skating

Keiko Hasegawa (長谷川 恵子, Hasegawa Keiko; born 21 September 1955) is a Japanese speed skater. She competed in two events at the 1976 Winter Olympics.
