= Tetsuo Narikawa =

Japanese actor

- Born: April 15, 1944; Chiyoda, Tokyo Japan
- Died: January 1, 2010 (aged 65)
- Occupation: Actor

Tetsuo Narikawa (成川 哲夫, Narikawa Tetsuo, 15 April 1944 – 1 January 2010) was a Japanese actor who was famous for playing the title role of Spectreman. He was also a specialist in karate and judo, and he was founder and president of the International Karate League in Japan.

== Career ==
Narikawa started his acting career in 1968. He appeared in numerous television shows with his role as Jouji Gamou, the alter-ego of "Spectreman" being his most noted. The 64-episode series was shown in the U.S. on UHF during the 1970s and 1980s.

Grand Master Narikawa was the president and founder of the Gensei-Ryu Seidokai International Karate Federation (Seidokai) with headquarters in Tokyo Japan. Seidokai celebrated its 25th anniversary in April 2004.

In the summer of 2009 (while under treatment for lung cancer) Grand Master Narikawa subdued an arsonist who was assaulting a Tokyo metropolitan police officer at the scene of the arson. Grand Master Narikawa immobilizeded the arsonist while the injured police officer regained his footing to make the arrest. When back-up arrived, the police officer was immediately hospitalized for severe facial injuries. The arsonist was a large individual 35 years younger than Grand Master Narikawa.

The philosophical foundation of Grand Master Narikawa's traditional Karate teachings has survived and are characterized by a moral code of behavior, both in and out of the Dōjō. The essence of this code of behavior is captured in the Japanese term “reigi.” Translated into English this word carries the meaning of the concepts of Courtesy, Manners, and Respect. Students of Karate are to learn to use their bodies as weapons; it is imperative for the students (and Instructors) to understand the tremendous responsibility that comes with such knowledge. There is a moral imperative to use this knowledge correctly and responsibly for their own development and for the moral development of the people with whom they come into contact with.

== Death ==
Narikawa died in Tokyo, Japan at the age of 65 from lung cancer.
