= Tokihiro Nakamura =

Japanese politician

- 中村 時広
- Official portrait, 2025

Governor of Ehime Prefecture
- Incumbent
- Assumed office 1 December 2010
- Monarchs: Akihito; Naruhito
- Preceded by: Moriyuki Kato

Mayor of Matsuyama
- In office 2 May 1999 – 21 October 2010
- Preceded by: Seiichi Tanaka
- Succeeded by: Katsuhito Noshi

Member of the House of Representatives
- In office 18 July 1993 – 27 September 1996
- Preceded by: Mayumi Utsunomiya
- Succeeded by: Constituency abolished
- Constituency: Ehime 1st

Member of the Ehime Prefectural Assembly
- In office 30 April 1987 – 20 January 1990

Personal details
- Born: 25 January 1960 (age 66) Matsuyama, Ehime, Japan
- Party: Independent
- Other political affiliations: JNP (1993–1994); NFP (1994–1996)
- Parent: Tokio Nakamura (father)
- Education: Keio University

Tokihiro Nakamura (中村 時広, Nakamura Tokihiro; born 25 January 1960) is a Japanese politician and the current governor of Ehime Prefecture, located in the Shikoku region of Japan. He succeeded Moriyuki Kato in the 2010 Ehime gubernatorial election. Nakamura has previously served as the mayor of Matsuyama, the largest city in Ehime and Shikoku, from 1999 to 2010. He has also represented Ehime in the national House of Representatives from 1993 to 1996 and before that in the Ehime Prefectural Assembly from 1987 to 1990.

After graduating from Keio University with a degree in law in 1982, he briefly entered Mitsubishi Corporation before commencing his political career, following in the footsteps of his father Tokio Nakamura, who also served in the House of Representatives from 1953 until 1960 and from 1963 until 1969 and then as mayor of Matsuyama from 1975 until 1991.

== Championships and accomplishments ==
- DDT Pro-Wrestling
  - Ironman Heavymetalweight Championship (1 time)
