= Akira Nakamura (academic) =

Japanese historian and academic (1934–2010)

Akira Nakamura (中村 粲, Nakamura Akira; 24 April 1934 – 23 June 2010) was a Japanese academic of English literature and self-trained historian specialising in Japan's wartime role in the first half of the 20th century. Born in Tokyo, Nakamura studied English literature and graduated from University of Tokyo in March 1959. He worked as a senior high school teacher of English until he clashed with the school principal. From April 1964 onwards he lectured at the newly founded Dokkyo University on a full-time basis until his retirement in March 2005 to become an emeritus professor. A representative of Showa History Research Institute, he frequently joined controversies surrounding Japan's wartime past, particularly the denialism or minimization of the Nanking Massacre of 1937–38. He completely rejected the Chinese government's claim of 300,000 death toll as mere propaganda, giving his own estimate of around 10,000 deaths. He was also a supporter of the film The Truth About Nanjing, containing apologism for Japan's wartime past, and which denied the existence of the Nanking Massacre. He detested what he viewed as "left leaning" mass media, especially The Asahi Shimbun newspaper and NHK public broadcasting organisation.

== Award ==
- Kikuchi Kan Prize (1995)

== Books ==
- The Way to Greater East Asia War (大東亜戦争への道, Daitōasensō e no Michi)
- What was Annexation of Korea (韓国併合とは何だったのか, Kankokuheigō towa Nan dat ta no ka)
- Dissentient Judgment of Justice Pal (English)
- The Tokyo Trial Rejection Non-Submitted Defense Counsel Data (東京裁判却下未提出弁護側資料, Tōkyōsaibankyakkamiteishutsubengogawashiryō)
