= Hachiro Maekawa =

Japanese baseball player (1912–2010)

Hachiro Maekawa (前川 八郎, Maekawa Hachirō) (1912 – March 16, 2010) was a former Yomiuri Giants player, and head of scouting (1967–1972) for the Giants. In 1936, Maekawa joined the Giants and contributed to their first championship the same year. After fighting in and surviving World War II, Maekawa played for the 1946 Hankyu Braves, the predecessor of the current Orix Buffaloes. Maekawa posted a record of 21–23 with a 3.34 ERA over four years in professional baseball. In 1967, years after his playing career was through, Maekawa was appointed the head of scouting for the Giants, and served in that capacity for almost five years until he retired from baseball management in 1972 at the age of 59.

== Death ==
On March 16, 2010, Maekawa died from respiratory failure at the age of 97.
