= Iwase river =

River in Miyazaki prefecture, Japan

Coordinates: 31°56′14″N 131°09′12″E

The Iwase River is a natural freshwater river located in Miyazaki prefecture in Kagoshima, Japan. The watershed of the river is popular for the presence of numerous springs and waterfalls. The river flows into the Oyodo River, which in turn flows to the Pacific Ocean.
