= Nishimorokata District, Miyazaki =

District in Miyazaki prefecture, Japan

Coordinates: 31.9256°N 130.990°E

Nishimorokata District in Miyazaki Prefecture

Nishimorokata (西諸県郡, Nishimorokata-gun) is a district located in Miyazaki Prefecture, Japan.

Following the March 23, 2010 Nojiri merger the district consists since then of the single town of Takaharu. As of October 1, 2019 the district has an estimated population of 8,709 and a density of 102 persons per km^{2}. The total area is 85.39 km^{2}.

== Towns and villages ==
- Takaharu

== Mergers ==
- On March 20, 2006, the village of Suki merged into the city of Kobayashi.
- On March 23, 2010, the town of Nojiri merged into the city of Kobayashi.
