= 2010 Nagano gubernatorial election =

Japanese gubernatorial election

- 8 August 2010
- Turnout: 52.70 ▼13.28
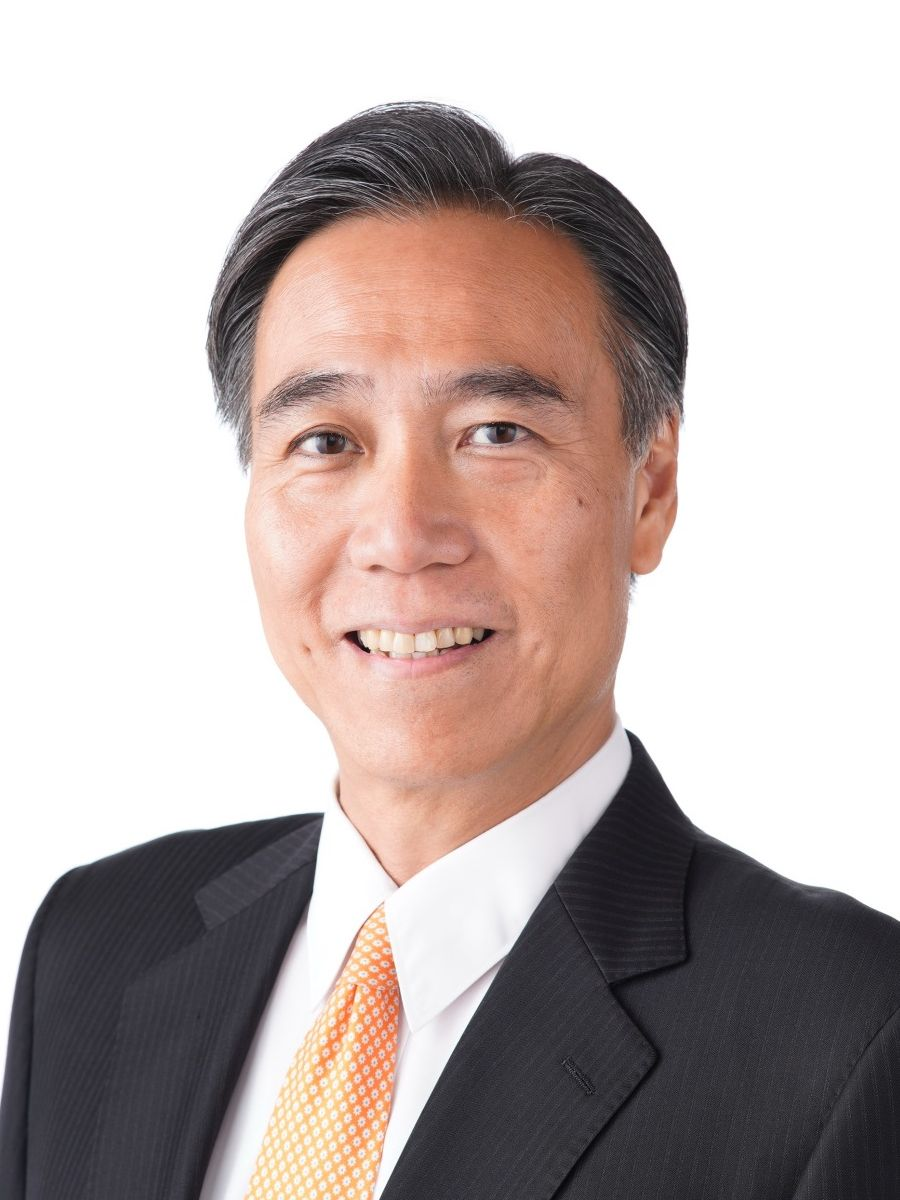
Candidate	Shuichi Abe	Yoshimasa Koshihara
Party	Independent	LDP
Popular vote	362,903	357,882
Percentage	39.85%	39.30%
Governor before election
Jin Murai
LDP
Elected Governor
Shuichi Abe
Democratic

A gubernatorial election was held on 8 August 2010 to elect the next governor of Nagano (長野県, Nagano-ken), a prefecture of Japan located in the Chūbu region of Honshu island.

== Candidates ==
Jin Murai, 73, a former veteran LDP lawmaker, elected in 2006 is not seeking reelection.

- Yoshimasa Koshihara, 63, vice-governor (2006–2010).
- Shuichi Abe, 49, bureaucrat, former Nagano vice governor (2001–2004). Backed by DPJ, he was also supported by the People’s New Party and SDP.
- Takeshi Matsumoto, 59, former fine arts museum curator. Presented by the JCP.

== Results ==
Nagano gubernatorial 2010
Party	Candidate	Votes	%	±%
Democratic	Shuichi Abe	362,903	39.85	▼6.73
LDP	Yoshimasa Koshihara	357,882	39.30	▼14.12
JCP	Takeshi Matsumoto	189,793	20.84	n/a
Turnout		919.908	52,70	▼13.28
Registered electors		1.745.560		
Swing to Democratic from LDP		Swing	0.55	
