= Takeki Manabe =

Japanese politician

- 真鍋 武紀

Governor of Kagawa Prefecture
- In office 5 September 1998 – 4 September 2010
- Monarch: Akihito
- Preceded by: Jōichi Hirai
- Succeeded by: Keizō Hamada

Personal details
- Born: 3 April 1940 (age 86) Shimotakaoka, Kagawa, Japan
- Party: Independent
- Education: University of Tokyo

Takeki Manabe (真鍋 武紀, Manabe Takeki; born 3 April 1940) is a Japanese politician who was the 43rd governor of Kagawa Prefecture in Japan, serving three terms from 1998 until 2010. In 2009 he announced he would not contest the 2010 election and was succeeded by Keizō Hamada.
