= Keizō Hamada =

Japanese politician

- 浜田 恵造

Governor of Kagawa Prefecture
- In office 5 September 2010 – 4 September 2022
- Monarchs: Akihito; Naruhito
- Preceded by: Takeki Manabe
- Succeeded by: Toyohito Ikeda

Personal details
- Born: 10 January 1952 (age 74) Kan'onji, Kagawa, Japan
- Party: Liberal Democratic
- Education: University of Tokyo
- Website: www.hamada-keizo.jp

Keizō Hamada (浜田 恵造, Hamada Keizō; born 10 January 1952) is a former Japanese politician and finance bureaucrat and a former governor of Kagawa Prefecture in the Shikoku region of Japan. He held office for three terms, from September 2010 to September 2022.
