= Totoro Station =

Railway station in Nobeoka, Miyazaki Prefecture, Japan

Totoro Station 土々呂駅
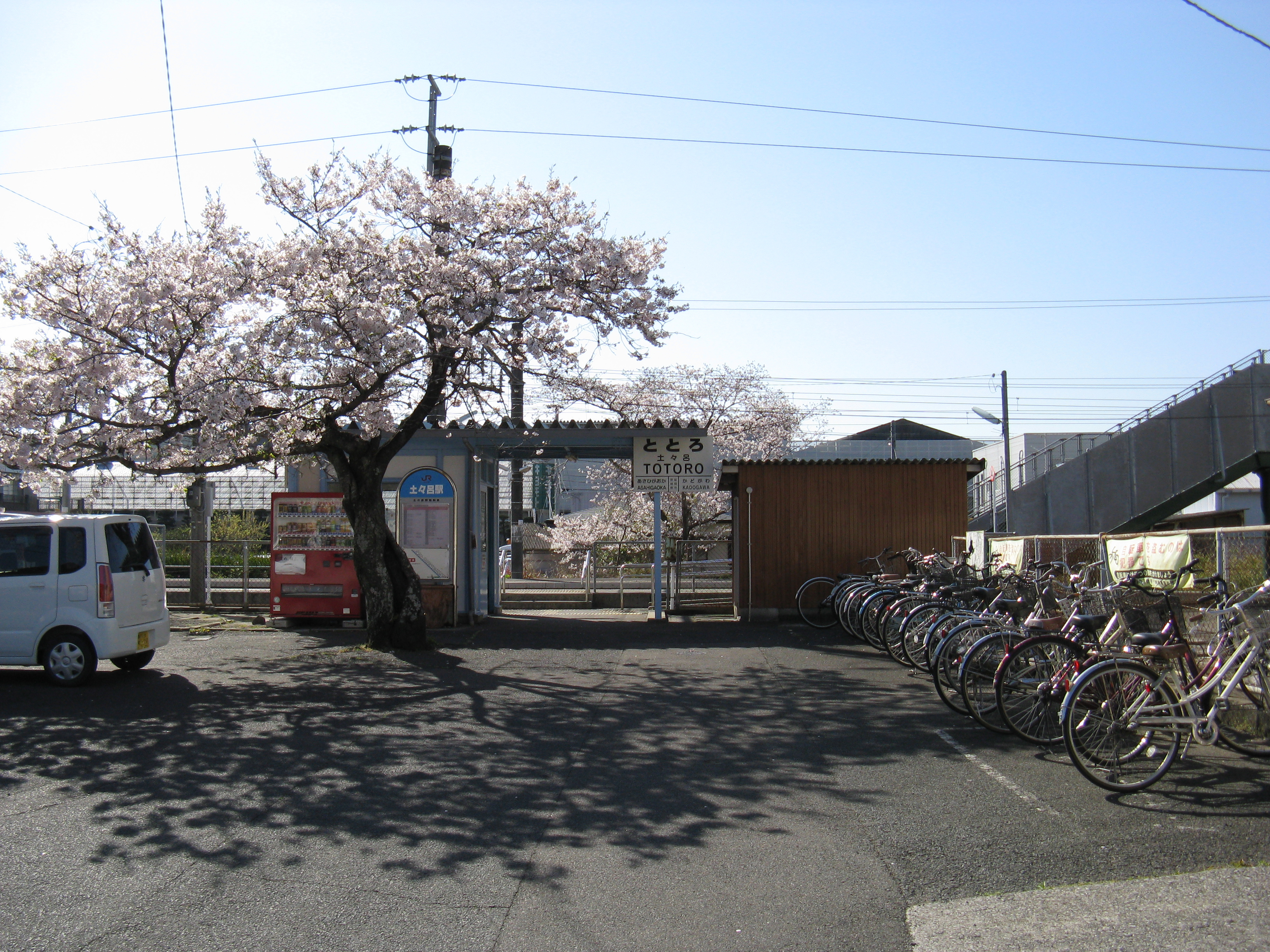
- Totoro Station in 2011

General information
- Location: 5 Chome Totoromachi, Nobeoka-shi, Miyazaki-ken 889-0513; Japan
- Coordinates: 32°30′28″N 131°40′30″E
- Operator: JR Kyushu
- Line: ■ Nippō Main Line
- Distance: 265.7 km from Kokura
- Platforms: 2 side platforms
- Tracks: 2 + 2 sidings

Construction
- Structure type: At grade
- Accessible: No - platforms linked by footbridge

Other information
- Status: Unstaffed
- Website: Official website

History
- Opened: 11 February 1922

Passengers
- FY2016: 67 daily

Services
Preceding station	JR Kyushu	Following station
Kadogawa towards Kagoshima	Nippō Main Line	Asahigaoka towards Kokura
Location
- Location within Miyazaki Prefecture Location within Japan

Totoro Station (土々呂駅, Totoro-eki) is a passenger railway station located in the city of Nobeoka, Miyazaki, Japan. It is operated by JR Kyushu and is on the Nippō Main Line.

== Lines ==
The station is served by the Nippō Main Line and is located 265.7 km from the starting point of the line at Kokura. Only local trains stop at this station.

== Layout ==
The station consists of two side platforms serving two tracks at grade with two sidings branching off track 1. There is no station building, only a shed at the station entrance which serves as a waiting room. Access to the opposite side platform is by means of a footbridge.

=== Platforms ===
1	■ ■ Nippō Main Line	for Nobeoka and Saiki for Miyazaki and Miyazaki Airport
2	■ ■ Nippō Main Line	for Miyazaki and Miyazaki Airport

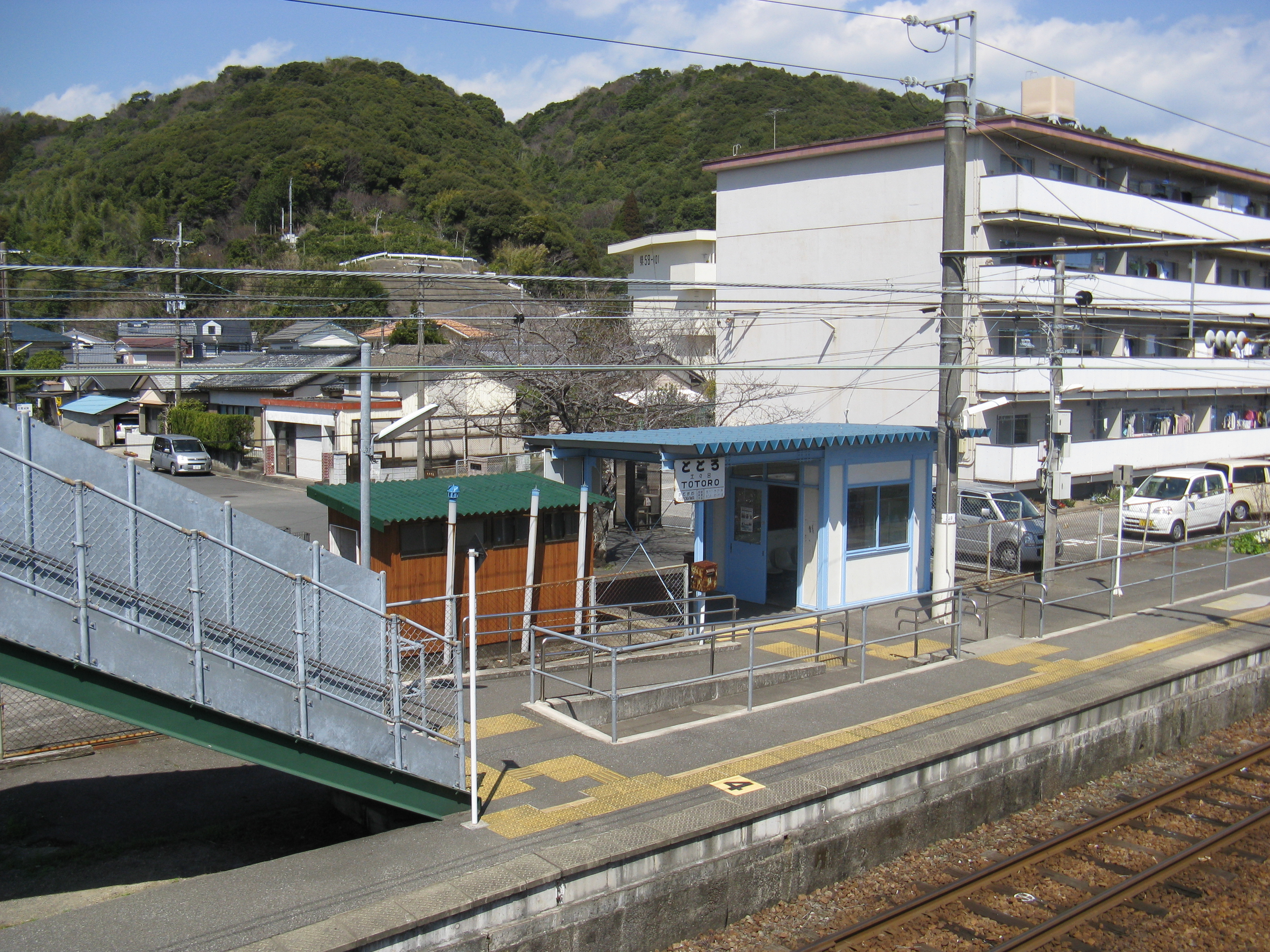
A view of platform 1.

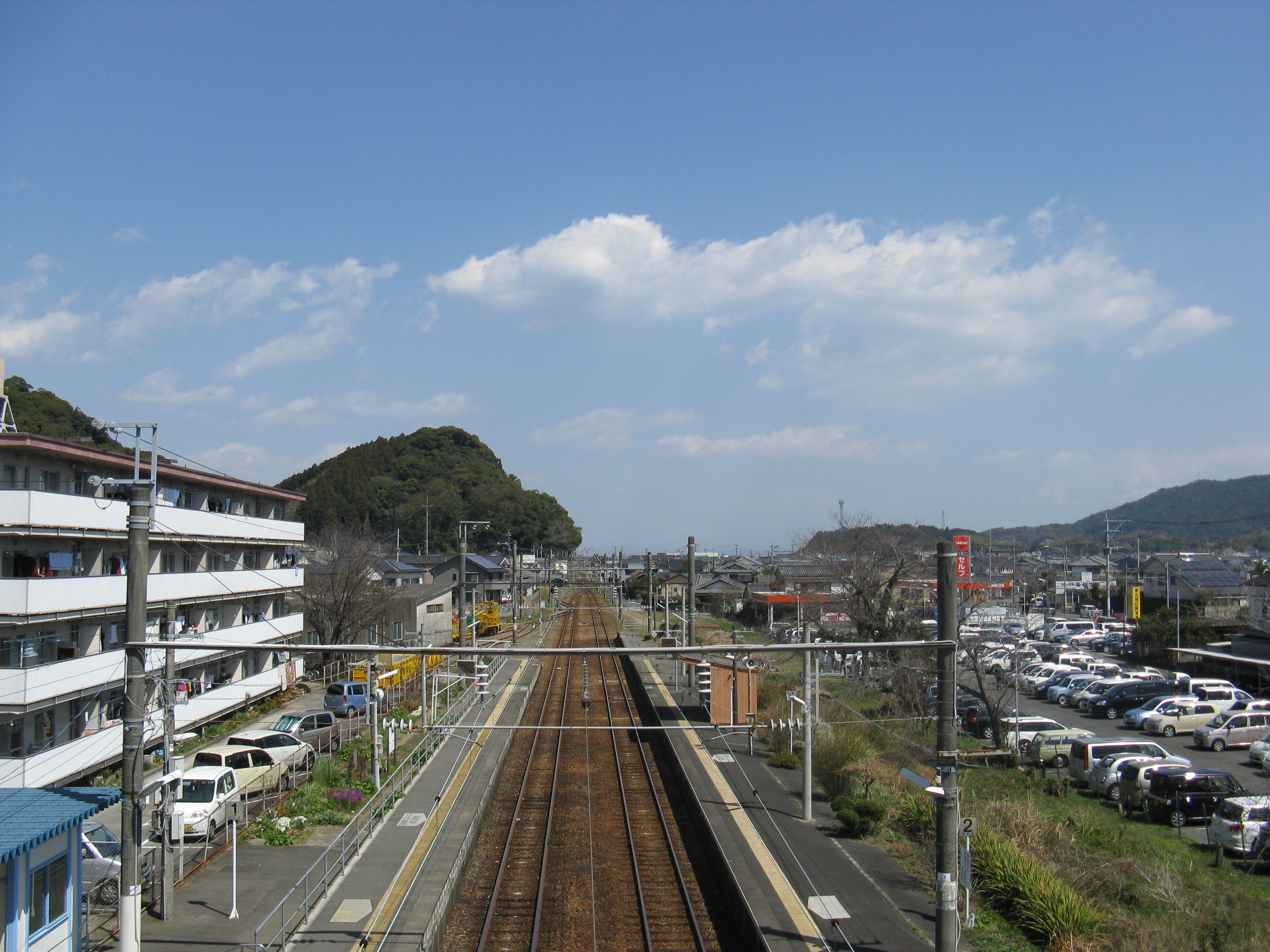
A view of the platforms and tracks. The sidings can be seen in the distance to the left.

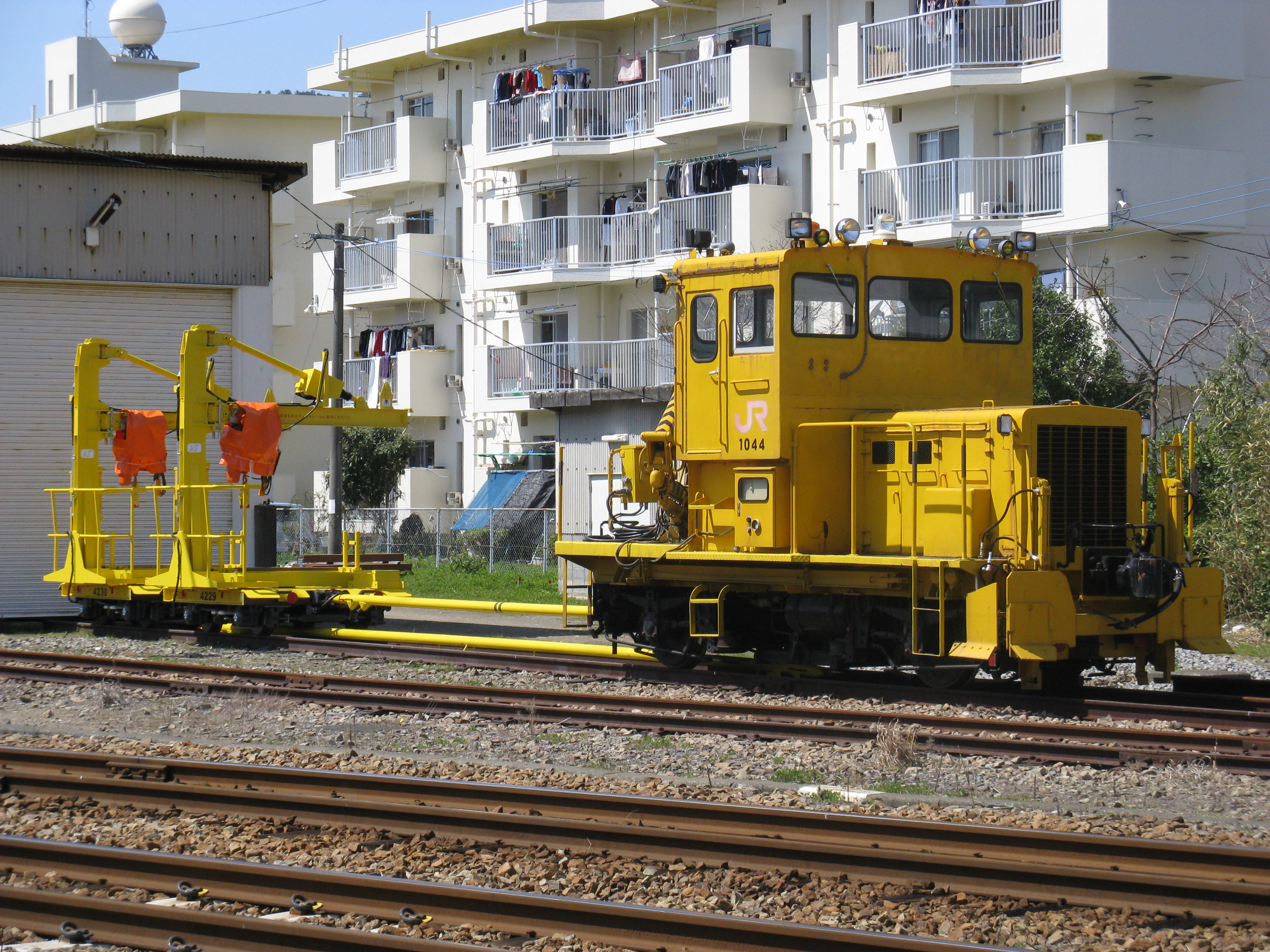
A view of the sidings.

== History ==
In 1913, the Miyazaki Prefectural Railway (宮崎県営鉄道) had opened a line from Miyazaki northwards to Hirose (now closed). After the Miyazaki Prefectural Railway was nationalized on 21 September 1917, Japanese Government Railways (JGR) undertook the subsequent extension of the track as part of the then Miyazaki Main Line, reaching Tomitaka (now Hyūgashi) by 11 October 1921. In the next phase of expansion, the track was extended to Minami-Nobeoka, which opened as the new northern terminus on 11 February 1922. Totoro was opened on the same day as an intermediate station on the new track. Expanding north in phases and joining up with other networks, the track eventually reached Kokura and the entire stretch from Kokura through Totoro to Miyakonojō was redesignated as the Nippō Main Line on 15 December 1923. Freight operations were discontinued in 1962, and baggage handling was abolished in 1972 at which time the station became unstaffed. With the privatization of Japanese National Railways (JNR), the successor of JGR, on 1 April 1987, Totoro came under the control of JR Kyushu.

== Passenger statistics ==
In fiscal 2016, the station was used by an average of 67 passengers (boarding only) per day.

== Surrounding area ==
- Nobeoka Regional Vocational Training Center
- Higashikyushu Driving School

== See also ==
- List of railway stations in Japan
