= Minami-Hyūga Station =

Railway station in Hyūga, Miyazaki Prefecture, Japan

Minami-Hyūga Station 南日向駅
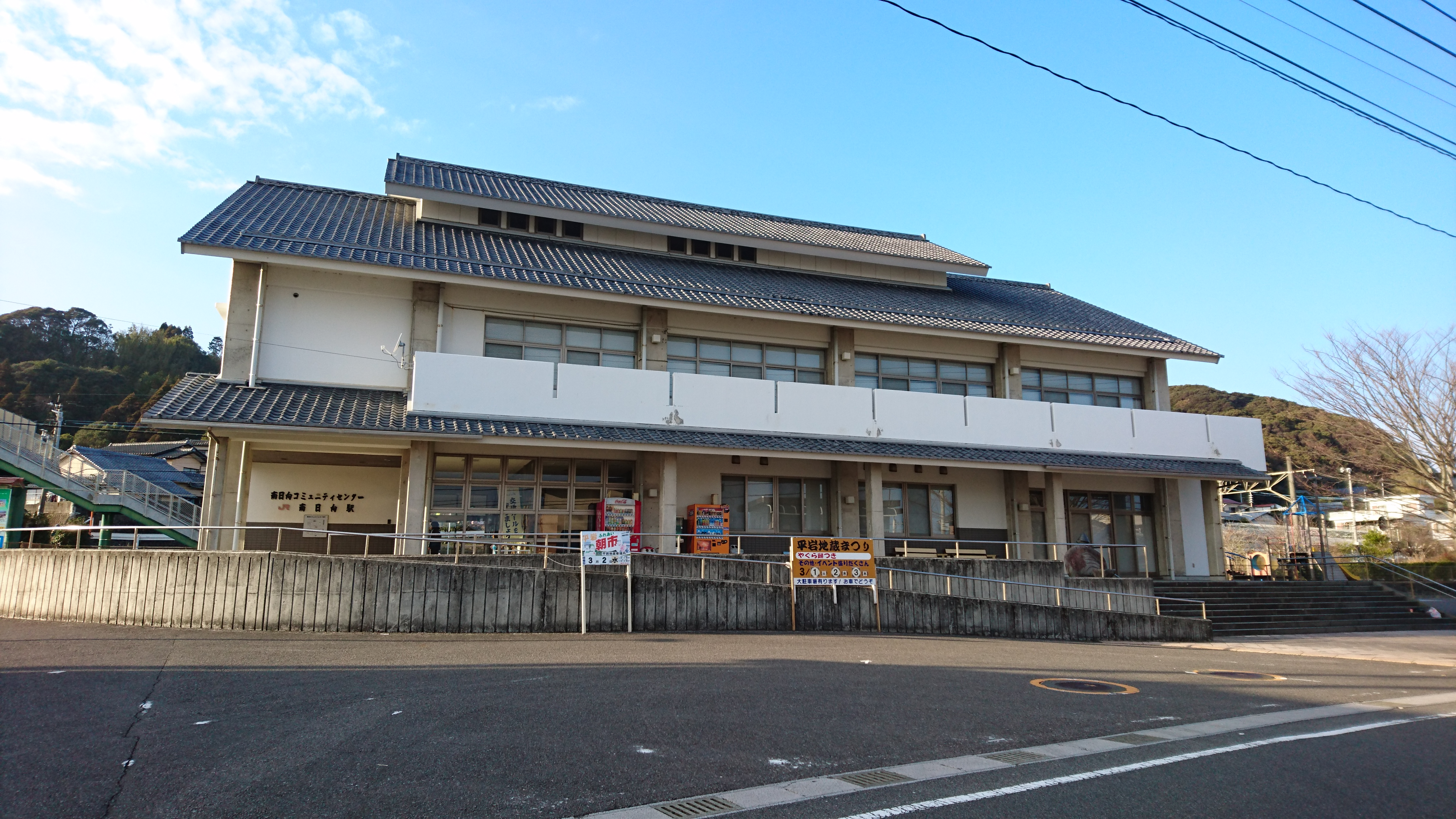
- Minami-Hyuga Station, Community Center, and Iwawaki City Hall Branch in 2016

General information
- Location: Hiraiwa, Hyūga-shi, Miyazaki-ken 883-0022; Japan
- Coordinates: 32°22′12″N 131°37′41″E
- Operator: JR Kyushu
- Line: ■ Nippō Main Line
- Distance: 283.1 km from Kokura
- Platforms: 2 side platforms
- Tracks: 2 + 1 siding

Construction
- Structure type: At grade
- Parking: Available
- Cycle facilities: Bike shed
- Accessible: Yes - platforms linked by footbridge but each have own entrance

Other information
- Status: Unstaffed
- Website: Official website

History
- Opened: 11 October 1921
- Former names: Iwawaki Station (until 25 May 1963)

Passengers
- FY2016: 48 daily

Services
Preceding station	JR Kyushu	Following station
Mimitsu towards Kagoshima	Nippō Main Line	Zaikōji towards Kokura
Location
- Location within Miyazaki Prefecture Location within Japan

Minami-Hyūga Station (南日向駅, Minami-Hyūga-eki) is a passenger railway station located in the city of Hyūga, Miyazaki, Japan. It is operated by JR Kyushu and is on the Nippō Main Line.

== Lines ==
The station is served by the Nippō Main Line and is located 283.1 km from the starting point of the line at Kokura.

== Layout ==
The station consists of two side platforms serving two tracks at grade with a siding branching off track 1. The station does not have a staffed ticket window and only a waiting area is provided and this occupies only a part of a large multi-storey Japanese style building which also houses a community centre and Iwawaki branch of Hyūga City Hall. There is an accessibility ramp up to the station building. Access to the platform opposite the station building requires a footbridge but there is also a direct entrance to platform 2 on the other side of the tracks. Parking and a bike shed are available at the station forecourt.

=== Platforms ===
1	■ ■ Nippō Main Line	for Nobeoka and Oita
2	■ ■ Nippō Main Line	for Miyazaki and Miyazaki Airport

== History ==
In 1913, the Miyazaki Prefectural Railway (宮崎県営鉄道) had opened a line from Miyazaki northwards to Hirose (now closed). After the Miyazaki Prefectural Railway was nationalized on 21 September 1917, Japanese Government Railways (JGR) undertook the subsequent extension of the track as part of the then Miyazaki Main Line, reaching Mimitsu by 11 October 1921. In the next phase of expansion, the track was extended to Tomitaka (now Hyūgashi) which opened as the new northern terminus on 11 October 1921. This station, then named Iwawaki Station (岩脇駅), was opened on the same day as an intermediate station on the new track. Freight services were discontinued in 1962. On 25 May 1963, the station was renamed Minami-Hyūga. Baggage handling was discontinued in 1974, and the station became unattended. With the privatization of Japanese National Railways (JNR), the successor of JGR, on 1 April 1987, the station came under the control of JR Kyushu.

== Passenger statistics ==
In fiscal 2016, the station was used by an average of 48 passengers (boarding only) per day.

== Surrounding area ==
- Hyuga City Hiraiwa Elementary and Junior High School

== See also ==
- List of railway stations in Japan
