= Mimitsu Station =

Railway station in Hyūga, Miyazaki Prefecture, Japan

Mimitsu Station 美々津駅
- Mimitsu Station in 2024

General information
- Location: Mimitsumachi, Hyūga-shi, Miyazaki-ken 889-1111; Japan
- Coordinates: 32°19′33″N 131°36′08″E
- Operator: JR Kyushu
- Line: ■ Nippō Main Line
- Distance: 289.7 km from Kokura
- Platforms: 1 side + 1 island platforms
- Tracks: 3 + 1 siding

Construction
- Structure type: At grade
- Parking: Available
- Cycle facilities: Bike shed
- Accessible: No - platforms linked by footbridge

Other information
- Status: Unstaffed
- Website: Official website

History
- Opened: 11 June 1921

Passengers
- FY2016: 123 daily

Services
| Preceding station | JR Kyushu | Following station |
|---|---|---|
| Higashi-Tsuno towards Kagoshima | Nippō Main Line | Minami-Hyūga towards Kokura |
Location
- Location within Miyazaki Prefecture Location within Japan

Mimitsu Station (美々津駅, Mimitsu-eki) is a passenger railway station located in the city of Hyūga, Miyazaki, Japan. It is operated by JR Kyushu and is on the Nippō Main Line.

== Lines ==
The station is served by the Nippō Main Line and is located 289.7 km from the starting point of the line at Kokura. Only local trains stop at this station.

== Layout ==
The station consists of a side platform and an island platform serving three tracks at grade with a siding branching off track 1. There is no station building, only a simple shed has been provided on platform 1 as a waiting room for passengers. Access to the island platform is by means of a footbridge. Parking and a bike shed are available at the station forecourt.

=== Platforms ===
| 1, 3 | ■ ■ Nippō Main Line | for Nobeoka |
| 1, 2, 3 | ■ ■ Nippō Main Line | for Miyazaki |

== History ==
In 1913, the Miyazaki Prefectural Railway (宮崎県営鉄道) had opened a line from Miyazaki northwards to Hirose (now closed). After the Miyazaki Prefectural Railway was nationalized on 21 September 1917, Japanese Government Railways (JGR) undertook the subsequent extension of the track as part of the then Miyazaki Main Line, reaching Takanabe by 11 September 1920. In the next phase of expansion, the track was extended to Mimitsu, which opened as the new northern terminus on 11 June 1921. It became a through station on 11 October 1921 when the track was further extended to Tomitaka (now Hyūgashi). Expanding north in phases and joining up with other networks, the track eventually reached Kokura and the entire stretch from Kokura through Mimitsu to Miyakonojō was redesignated as the Nippō Main Line on 15 December 1923. Freight operations were discontinued in 1962 and baggage handling in 1974. With the privatization of Japanese National Railways (JNR), the successor of JGR, on 1 April 1987, the station came under the control of JR Kyushu.

== Passenger statistics ==
In fiscal 2016, the station was used by an average of 123 passengers (boarding only) per day.

== Surrounding area ==
- Hyuga City Mimitsu Junior High School
- Hyuga City Hall Mimitsu Branch

== See also ==
- List of railway stations in Japan
