= Asahigaoka Station =

Asahigaoka Station is the name of several train stations in Japan.

- Asahigaoka Station (Miyagi) - (旭ヶ丘駅) in Sendai, Miyagi Prefecture
- Asahigaoka Station (Miyazaki) - (旭ヶ丘駅) in Miyazaki Prefecture
- Asahigaoka Station (Shimane) - (朝日ヶ丘駅) in Shimane Prefecture
- Asahigaoka Station (Toyama) - (旭ヶ丘駅) in Toyama Prefecture
