= Kadogawa Station =

Railway station in Kadogawa, Miyazaki Prefecture, Japan

Kadogawa Station 門川駅
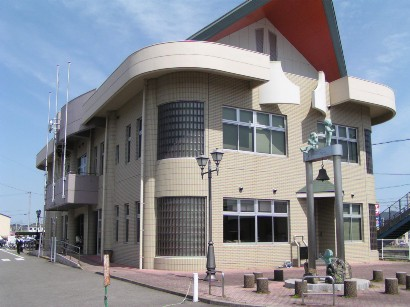
- Kadogawa Station in 2005

General information
- Location: Kadogawaozue, Kadogawa-cho, Higashiusuki-gun, Miyazaki-ken 889-0611; Japan
- Coordinates: 32°28′39″N 131°39′14″E
- Operator: JR Kyushu
- Line: ■ Nippō Main Line
- Distance: 270.0 km from Kokura
- Platforms: 1 side + 1 island platform
- Tracks: 3 + 1 siding

Construction
- Structure type: At grade
- Cycle facilities: Bike shed
- Accessible: No - platforms linked by footbridge

Other information
- Status: Kan'i itaku agent on site
- Website: Official website

History
- Opened: 11 February 1922

Passengers
- FY2016: 424 daily
- Rank: 260th (among JR Kyushu stations)

Services
Preceding station	JR Kyushu	Following station
Hyūgashi towards Kagoshima	Nippō Main Line Express Nichirin	Minami-Nobeoka towards Kokura
Hyūgashi towards Kagoshima	Nippō Main Line	Totoro towards Kokura
Location
- Location within Miyazaki Prefecture Location within Japan

Kadogawa Station (門川駅, Kadogawa-eki) is a passenger railway station located in the town of Kadogawa, Miyazaki, Japan. It is operated by of JR Kyushu and is on the Nippō Main Line.

== Lines ==
The station is served by the Nippō Main Line and is located 270.0 km from the starting point of the line at Kokura.

== Layout ==
The station consists of a side platform and an island platform serving three tracks at grade. The station building is a modern two storey concrete structure which houses a staffed ticket window, a waiting area and a community centre. Access to the island platform is by means of a footbridge. A bike shed is provided at the station forecourt.

The station is not staffed by JR Kyushu but some types of tickets are available from a kan'i itaku agent who staffs the ticket window.

== History ==
In 1913, the Miyazaki Prefectural Railway (宮崎県営鉄道) had opened a line from Miyazaki northwards to Hirose (now closed). After the Miyazaki Prefectural Railway was nationalized on 21 September 1917, Japanese Government Railways (JGR) undertook the subsequent extension of the track as part of the then Miyazaki Main Line, reaching Tomitaka (now Hyūgashi) by 11 October 1921. In the next phase of expansion, the track was extended to Minami-Nobeoka, which opened as the new northern terminus on 11 February 1922. Kadogawa was opened on the same day as an intermediate station on the new track. Expanding north in phases and joining up with other networks, the track eventually reached Kokura and the entire stretch from Kokura through Kadogawa to Miyakonojō was redesignated as the Nippō Main Line on 15 December 1923. Freight operations were discontinued in 1973, and baggage handling was abolished in 1984. With the privatization of Japanese National Railways (JNR), the successor of JGR, on 1 April 1987, Kadogawa came under the control of JR Kyushu.

== Passenger statistics ==
In fiscal 2016, the station was used by an average of 424 passengers daily (boarding passengers only), and it ranked 260th among the busiest stations of JR Kyushu.

== Surrounding area ==
- Kadokawa Town Hall
- Kadokawa Town Kadokawa Elementary School
- Kadokawa Town Kadokawa Junior High School
- Miyazaki Prefectural Kadokawa High School

== See also ==
- List of railway stations in Japan
