= Nobeoka =

Nobeoka 延岡市
- City
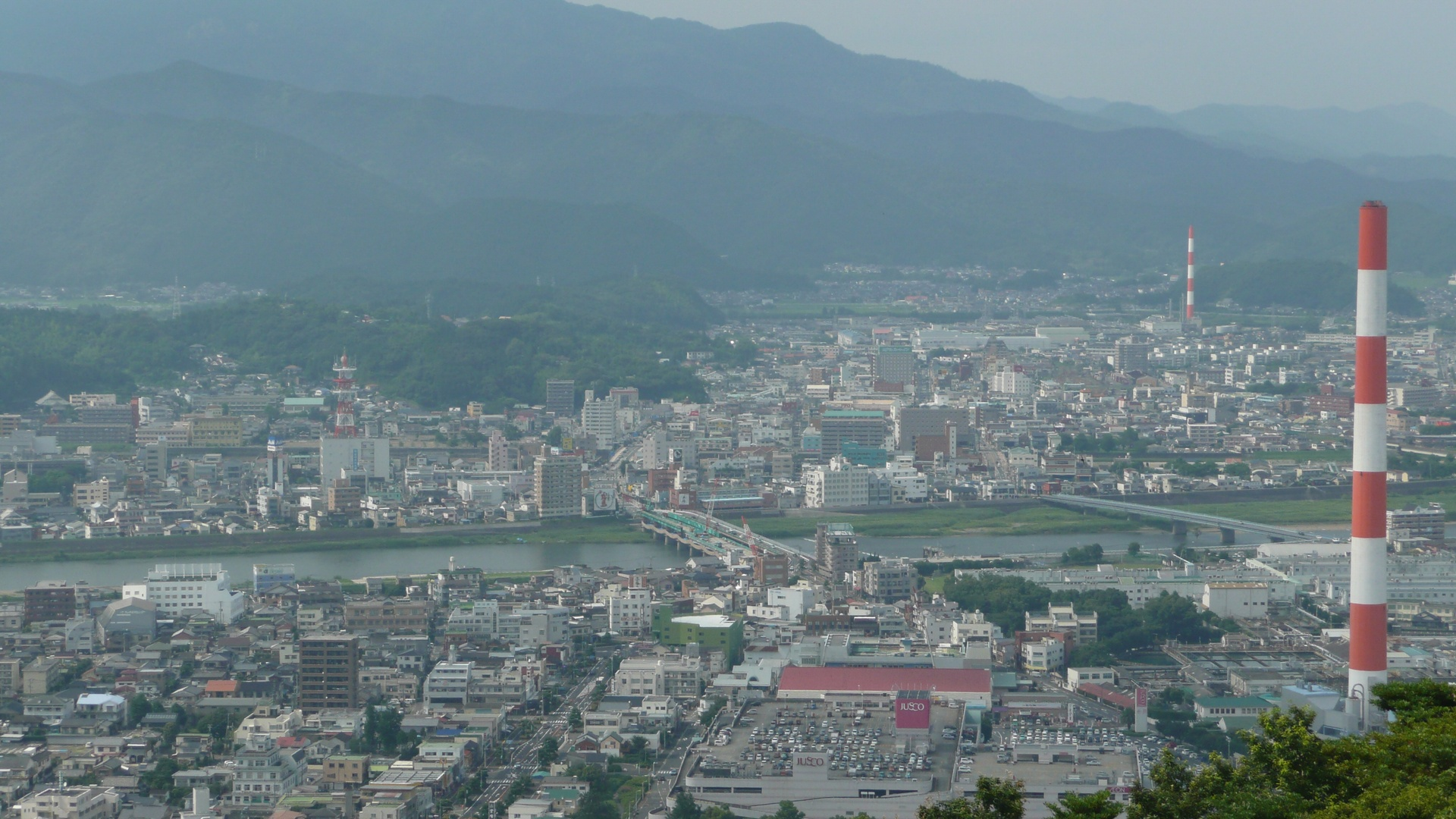
- Panorama view of Agata and Nakashima, other downtown areas and the Ose River in Nobeoka, from Mount Atago.

- Flag Chapter
- Location of Nobeoka in Miyazaki Prefecture

- Location in Japan
- Coordinates: 32°34′56″N 131°39′54″E
- Country: Japan
- Region: Kyushu
- Prefecture: Miyazaki
- Town settled: May 1, 1889
- City settled: February 11, 1933

Government
  - Mayor: Hisatomo Miura (ja:三浦久知) - from July 2025

Area
  - Total: 868.02 km^{2} (335.14 sq mi)

Population (October 1, 2023)
  - Total: 113,367
  - Density: 130.60/km^{2} (338.26/sq mi)
- Time zone: UTC+09:00 (JST)
- City hall address: 2-1 Higashihonkōji, Nobeoka-shi, Miyazaki-ken 882-8686
- Climate: Cfa
- Website: Official website
- Symbols
- Flower: Canna
- Tree: Round Leaf Holly (Ilex rotunda)

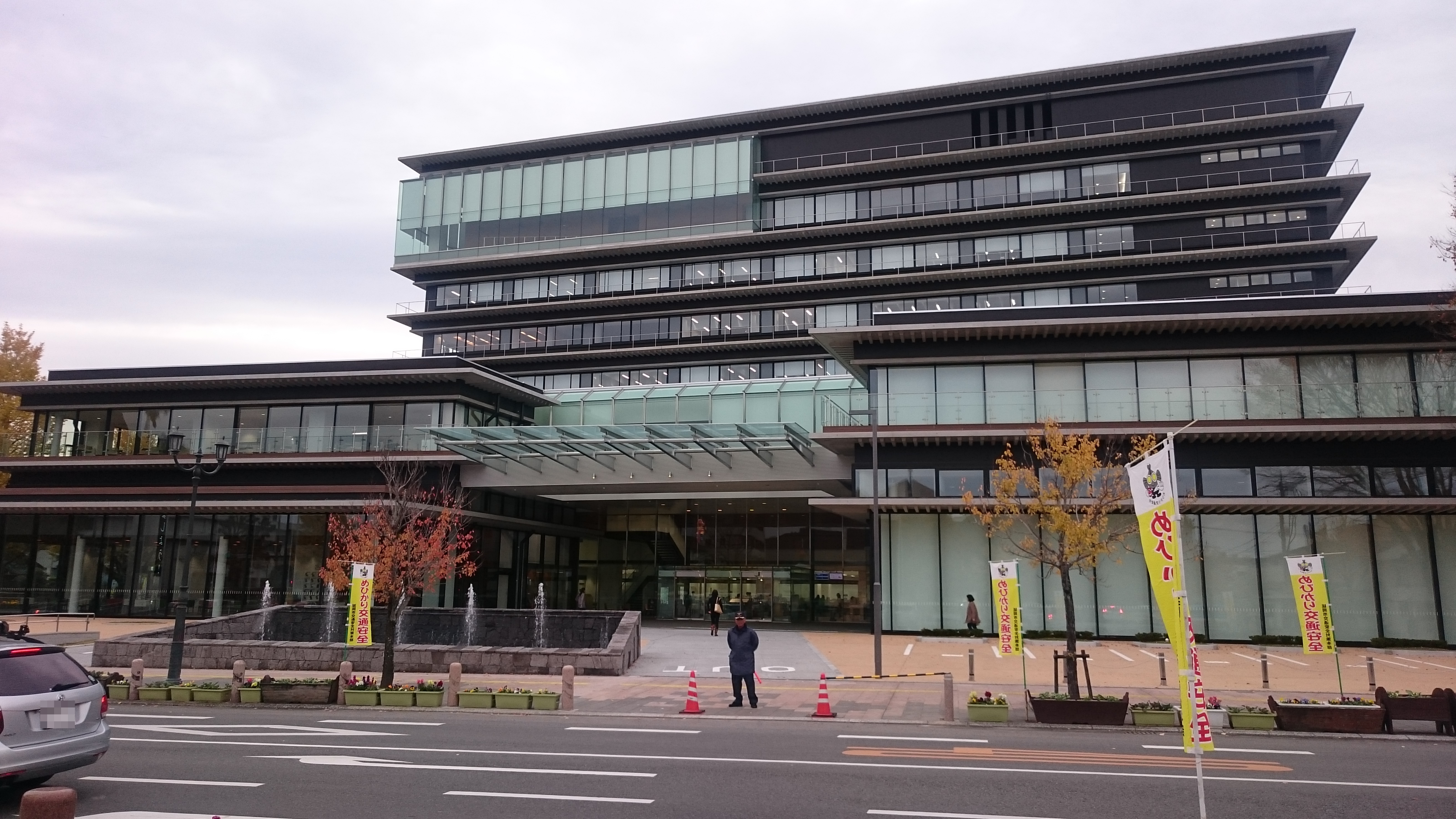
Nobeoka City Hall

Central Nobeoka City

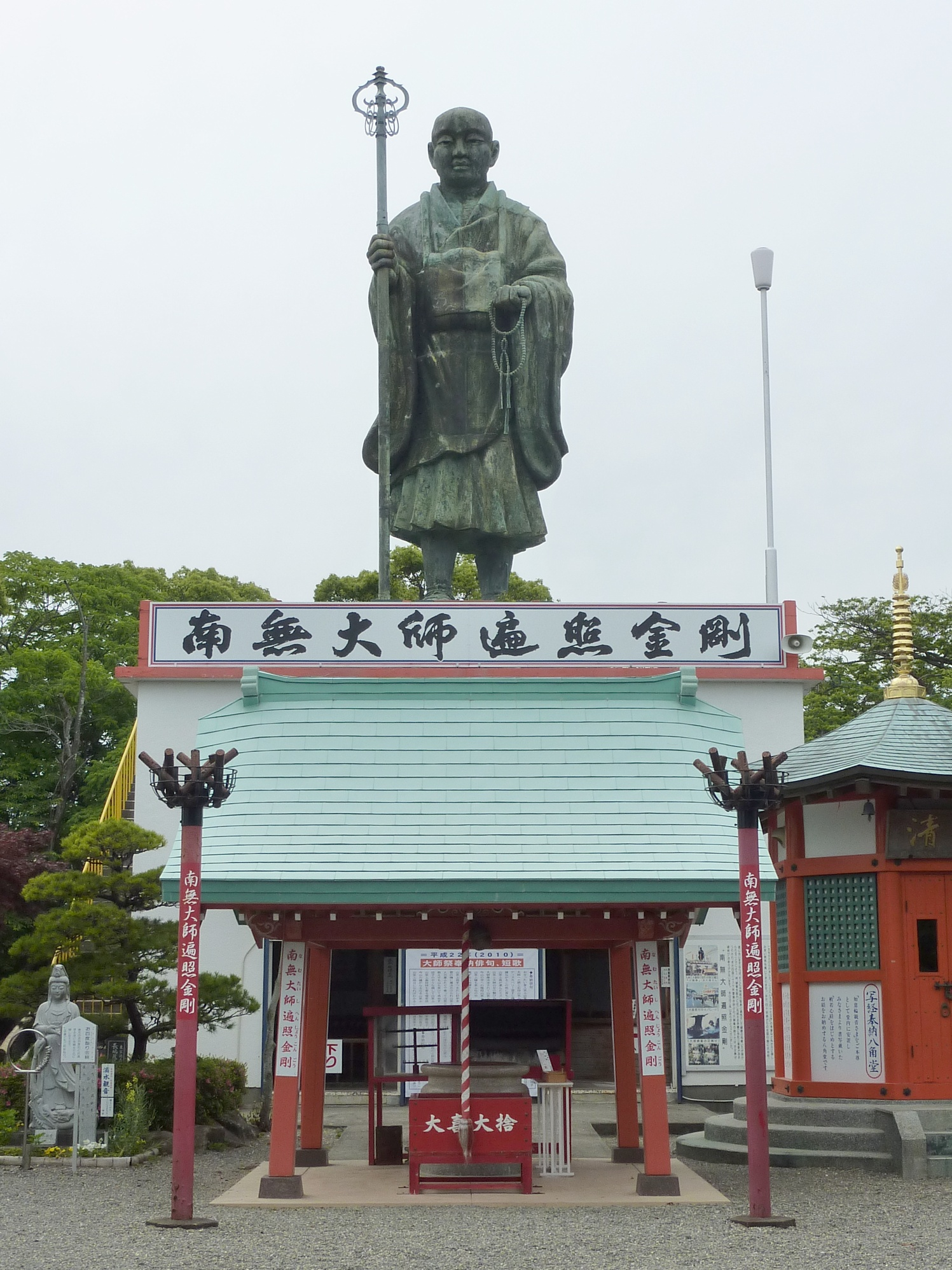
Imayama Buddhist Statue in Soryo area

Nobeoka (延岡市, Nobeoka-shi) is a city located in the north of Miyazaki Prefecture, Japan. As of 1 October 2023, the city had an estimated population of 113,367 in 51272 households, and a population density of 130 persons per km². The total area of the city is 868.02 km^{2} (335.14 sq mi).

== Geography ==
Nobeoka is located in northern Miyazaki Prefecture. It is bordered by the Hyūga Sea to the east and is surrounded by the Kyushu Mountains to the north, west and south. Many rivers flow through the city, the largest of which is the Gokase River. The eastern coast of Nobeoka City is within the borders of the Nippō Kaigan Quasi-National Park, and the northwestern part is within the borders of the Sobo-Katamuki Quasi-National Park.

=== Neighboring municipalities ===
Miyazaki Prefecture

- Hinokage
- Kadogawa
- Misato

Ōita Prefecture

- Saiki

=== Climate ===
Nobeoka has a humid subtropical climate (Köppen climate classification Cfa), which is hot and humid in the summer (above 30 °C (86 °F)) and is somewhat cold in the winter with temperatures dropping to around freezing (0 °C (32 °F)). Snowfall can be seen in the winter months, but does not accumulate because of coastal warming effects.

Climate data for Nobeoka (1991−2020 normals, extremes 1961−present)
Month	Jan	Feb	Mar	Apr	May	Jun	Jul	Aug	Sep	Oct	Nov	Dec	Year
Record high °C (°F)	23.9 (75.0)	26.1 (79.0)	29.7 (85.5)	29.6 (85.3)	33.3 (91.9)	36.1 (97.0)	38.5 (101.3)	38.4 (101.1)	35.5 (95.9)	32.6 (90.7)	29.5 (85.1)	23.3 (73.9)	38.5 (101.3)
Mean maximum °C (°F)	19.0 (66.2)	21.0 (69.8)	23.4 (74.1)	26.0 (78.8)	29.5 (85.1)	32.9 (91.2)	34.8 (94.6)	35.0 (95.0)	32.8 (91.0)	29.3 (84.7)	24.8 (76.6)	20.2 (68.4)	35.6 (96.1)
Mean daily maximum °C (°F)	12.4 (54.3)	13.6 (56.5)	16.6 (61.9)	21.0 (69.8)	24.6 (76.3)	26.5 (79.7)	30.4 (86.7)	31.6 (88.9)	28.8 (83.8)	24.5 (76.1)	19.4 (66.9)	14.3 (57.7)	22.0 (71.6)
Daily mean °C (°F)	6.8 (44.2)	7.9 (46.2)	11.1 (52.0)	15.5 (59.9)	19.5 (67.1)	22.5 (72.5)	26.3 (79.3)	27.0 (80.6)	24.1 (75.4)	19.2 (66.6)	13.8 (56.8)	8.6 (47.5)	16.9 (62.3)
Mean daily minimum °C (°F)	1.9 (35.4)	2.9 (37.2)	6.0 (42.8)	10.4 (50.7)	14.9 (58.8)	19.2 (66.6)	23.0 (73.4)	23.6 (74.5)	20.4 (68.7)	14.8 (58.6)	9.1 (48.4)	3.8 (38.8)	12.5 (54.5)
Mean minimum °C (°F)	−3.3 (26.1)	−2.4 (27.7)	−0.5 (31.1)	3.2 (37.8)	9.5 (49.1)	14.8 (58.6)	20.2 (68.4)	20.7 (69.3)	14.7 (58.5)	8.4 (47.1)	2.4 (36.3)	−2.1 (28.2)	−3.7 (25.3)
Record low °C (°F)	−7.0 (19.4)	−6.6 (20.1)	−3.9 (25.0)	−1.7 (28.9)	4.2 (39.6)	10.2 (50.4)	14.7 (58.5)	16.5 (61.7)	8.6 (47.5)	3.0 (37.4)	−2.4 (27.7)	−5.5 (22.1)	−7.0 (19.4)
Average precipitation mm (inches)	59.4 (2.34)	77.8 (3.06)	145.5 (5.73)	186.5 (7.34)	250.6 (9.87)	423.5 (16.67)	276.5 (10.89)	265.9 (10.47)	368.2 (14.50)	209.5 (8.25)	105.0 (4.13)	66.3 (2.61)	2,435.6 (95.89)
Average precipitation days (≥ 1.0 mm)	5.1	6.4	9.3	9.6	10.7	15.2	11.5	11.7	11.9	7.6	6.6	5.0	110.6
Average relative humidity (%)	63	64	66	70	75	84	83	82	80	75	73	67	74
Mean monthly sunshine hours	191.2	174.9	187.2	192.7	185.1	124.7	186.1	198.1	156.5	177.4	167.6	187.3	2,130
Source: Japan Meteorological Agency

Climate data for Kitaura, Nobeoka (1991−2020 normals, extremes 1977−present)
Month	Jan	Feb	Mar	Apr	May	Jun	Jul	Aug	Sep	Oct	Nov	Dec	Year
Record high °C (°F)	21.1 (70.0)	23.3 (73.9)	29.4 (84.9)	28.0 (82.4)	30.9 (87.6)	35.4 (95.7)	38.9 (102.0)	38.3 (100.9)	34.9 (94.8)	32.4 (90.3)	28.3 (82.9)	23.0 (73.4)	38.9 (102.0)
Mean daily maximum °C (°F)	12.5 (54.5)	13.3 (55.9)	16.2 (61.2)	20.4 (68.7)	24.0 (75.2)	26.0 (78.8)	29.6 (85.3)	31.0 (87.8)	28.8 (83.8)	24.6 (76.3)	19.5 (67.1)	14.5 (58.1)	21.7 (71.1)
Daily mean °C (°F)	7.5 (45.5)	8.4 (47.1)	11.3 (52.3)	15.6 (60.1)	19.5 (67.1)	22.4 (72.3)	25.9 (78.6)	27.0 (80.6)	24.6 (76.3)	20.0 (68.0)	14.7 (58.5)	9.6 (49.3)	17.2 (63.0)
Mean daily minimum °C (°F)	3.0 (37.4)	3.8 (38.8)	6.6 (43.9)	10.9 (51.6)	15.3 (59.5)	19.3 (66.7)	23.1 (73.6)	24.0 (75.2)	21.3 (70.3)	16.3 (61.3)	10.5 (50.9)	5.1 (41.2)	13.3 (55.9)
Record low °C (°F)	−6.9 (19.6)	−6.0 (21.2)	−4.3 (24.3)	0.0 (32.0)	5.9 (42.6)	12.7 (54.9)	14.1 (57.4)	16.1 (61.0)	11.6 (52.9)	4.9 (40.8)	0.3 (32.5)	−4.2 (24.4)	−6.9 (19.6)
Average precipitation mm (inches)	61.3 (2.41)	78.6 (3.09)	152.9 (6.02)	196.5 (7.74)	260.6 (10.26)	418.5 (16.48)	255.7 (10.07)	244.1 (9.61)	328.6 (12.94)	201.2 (7.92)	114.7 (4.52)	64.5 (2.54)	2,390.2 (94.10)
Average precipitation days (≥ 1.0 mm)	5.4	6.2	9.6	9.8	10.8	14.7	11.9	11.9	11.6	7.8	6.6	4.9	111.2
Mean monthly sunshine hours	183.0	171.8	186.5	195.7	187.5	129.2	186.5	202.5	163.1	178.1	166.4	178.5	2,128.9
Source: Japan Meteorological Agency

=== Demographics ===
Per Japanese census data, the population of Nobeoka in 2020 is 118,394 people. Nobeoka has been conducting censuses since 1920.

Historical population

Year	Pop.	±%
1920	69,114	—
1925	72,886	+5.5%
1930	81,121	+11.3%
1935	114,251	+40.8%
1940	117,271	+2.6%
1945	116,196	−0.9%
1950	132,859	+14.3%
1955	146,716	+10.4%
1960	151,800	+3.5%
1965	148,662	−2.1%
1970	149,567	+0.6%

Year	Pop.	±%
1975	153,432	+2.6%
1980	154,881	+0.9%
1985	153,835	−0.7%
1990	146,989	−4.5%
1995	141,751	−3.6%
2000	139,176	−1.8%
2005	135,182	−2.9%
2010	131,198	−2.9%
2015	125,159	−4.6%
2020	118,394	−5.4%

Nobeoka population statistics

== History ==
The area of Nobeoka was part of ancient Hyūga Province, and was called "Agata" from the Heian period and was ruled by the Tsuchimochi clan for 700 years into the Sengoku period. In 1587, as a result of Toyotomi Hideyoshi's conquest of Kyushu, Takahashi Motane Takahashi established "Hyūgagata domain" (later Nobeoka Domain) and constructed Nobeoka Castle between 1601 and 1603. The center of modern Nobeoka is the former jōkamachi of that castle. The place name of "Nobeoka" only dates from the mid-Edo period. Following the Meiji restoration, the town of Nobeoka was established on May 1, 1889 with the creation of the modern municipalities system. The Naito clan, the former daimyō of Nobeoka, had granted the town many privilegesand laid the foundation for modern Nobeoka through development of copper mines and power sources. In 1923, Noguchi Jun built a factory for Nippon Nitrogen Fertilizer (now Chisso), and Nobeoka developed into one of the prefecture's leading industrial cities. The merger of Nobeoka Town, Tsunetomi Village, and Okatomi Village led to Nobeoka's elevation to city status on February 11, 1933. By 1939, Nobeoka became the city with the largest population in Miyazaki Prefecture.

During World War II, Nobeoka was one of the most important centers of military explosives in Japan. On the night of June 28-29th, 1945, 117 United States B-29s fire-bombed the city, destroying 1.35 square km, or 36% of the city. On July 16, 1945, 33 US B-24s bombed the bridges in around the city, severing the strategically important Nippō Main Line railway. With the dissolution of the zaibatsu after World War II, Nichitsu Konzern was dismantled, and the factory in Nobeoka was restarted as Asahi Kasei.

On February 20, 2006, Nobeoka absorbed the towns of Kitakata and Kitaura (both from Higashiusuki District). On March 31, 2007, the town of Kitagawa (also from Higashiusuki District) was also merged into Nobeoka.

== Government ==
Nobeoka has a mayor-council form of government with a directly elected mayor and a unicameral city council of 27 members. Nobeoka contributes five members to the Miyazaki Prefectural Assembly. In terms of national politics, the city is part of the Miyazaki 2nd district of the lower house of the Diet of Japan.

== Economy ==
The city's economy depends strongly on the company Asahi Kasei, a producer of synthetic and industrial fibers. It is known regionally for its Ayu fish.

== Education ==
Nobeoka has 24 public elementary schools, 12 public junior high schools and four combined elementary/junior high schools operated by the city government. The city has five public high schools operated by the Miyazaki Prefectural Board of Education. There are also one private elementary school and 3 private combined middle/high schools. The prefecture operates one special education school for the handicapped. Kyushu University of Health and Welfare, a private university, is located in Nobeoka.

== Transportation ==
=== Railways ===
The Kyushu Railway Company (JR Kyushu) Nippō Main Line runs through the city from north to south. Limited express trains stop at Nobeoka Station and Minami-Nobeoka Station. It is also directly connected to Miyazaki Airport, and can be reached in approximately 70 minutes using the limited express trains Nichirin and Hyuga. It takes about two hours to get to Oita Station. Local trains north of Nobeoka Station only make 1.5 round trips a day. The Takachiho Line used to branch off from Nobeoka Station to Takachiho, but services were discontinued on September 6, 2005, after flooding triggered by Typhoon Nabi washed away two bridges on the line, halting all operations. Efforts to obtain funding for rebuilding were unsuccessful, and the company was liquidated in 2009.

JR Kyushu - Nippō Main Line

- Ichitana - Kitagawa - Hyūga-Nagai - Kita-Nobeoka - Nobeoka - Minami-Nobeoka - Asahigaoka - Totoro

=== Highways ===
- Higashikyushu Expressway
- Kyushu Chūō Expressway
- National Route 10
- National Route 218
- National Route 326
- National Route 388

== Sister cities ==
- Medford, Massachusetts, United States, since August 1980

== Local attractions ==
=== Notable places ===
- Nobeoka Castle - A castle ruin, one of the Continued Top 100 Japanese Castles.

== Notable people from Nobeoka ==
- Ino Hidefumi, musician
- Haruki Ishiya, voice actor
- Akihisa Mera (The Great Kabuki), professional wrestler
