= Zaikōji Station =

Railway station in Hyūga, Miyazaki Prefecture, Japan

Zaikōji Station 財光寺駅
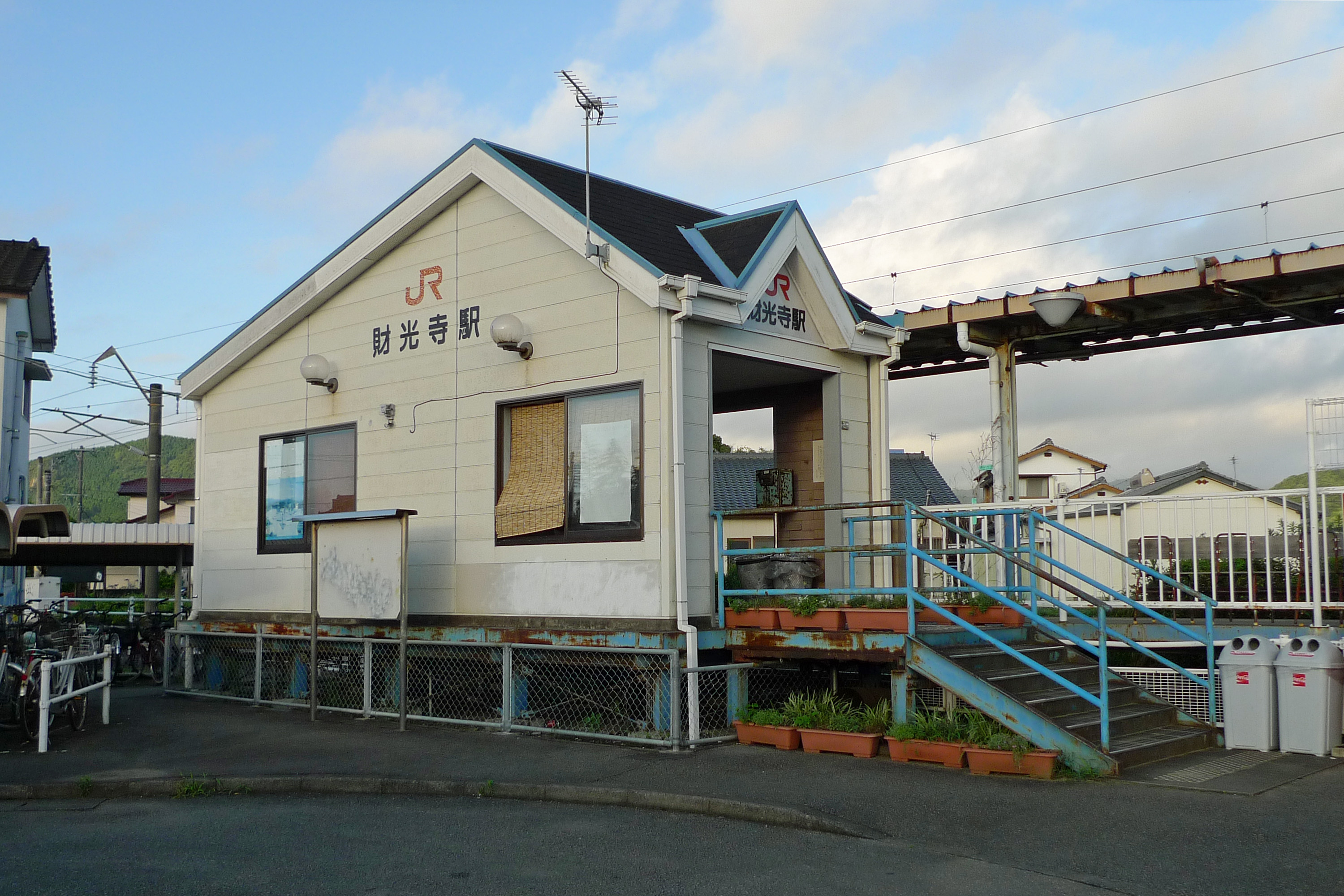
- Zaikōji station building in July 2010

General information
- Location: Zaikoji, Hyūga-shi, Miyazaki-ken 883-0021; Japan
- Coordinates: 32°24′20″N 131°37′40″E
- Operator: JR Kyushu
- Line: ■ Nippō Main Line
- Distance: 278.9 km from Kokura
- Platforms: 1 side platform
- Tracks: 1

Construction
- Structure type: At grade
- Parking: Available
- Cycle facilities: Bike shed
- Accessible: No - steps to station building and platform

Other information
- Status: Kan'i itaku agent on site
- Website: Official website

History
- Opened: 11 March 1989

Passengers
- FY2016: 265 daily

Services
Preceding station	JR Kyushu	Following station
Minami-Hyūga towards Kagoshima	Nippō Main Line	Hyūgashi towards Kokura
Location
- Location within Miyazaki Prefecture Location within Japan

Zaikōji Station (財光寺駅, Zaikōji-eki) is a passenger railway station located in the city of Hyūga, Miyazaki, Japan. It is operated by JR Kyushu and is on the Nippō Main Line.

== Lines ==
The station is served by the Nippō Main Line and is located 278.9 km from the starting point of the line at Kokura.

== Layout ==
The station consists of a side platform serving a single track at grade. The station building is a simple functional wooden shed structure which houses a staffed ticket window and a bench. A bike shed and limited parking are provided at the station forecourt.

The station is not staffed by JR Kyushu but some types of tickets are available from a kan'i itaku agent who staffs the ticket window.

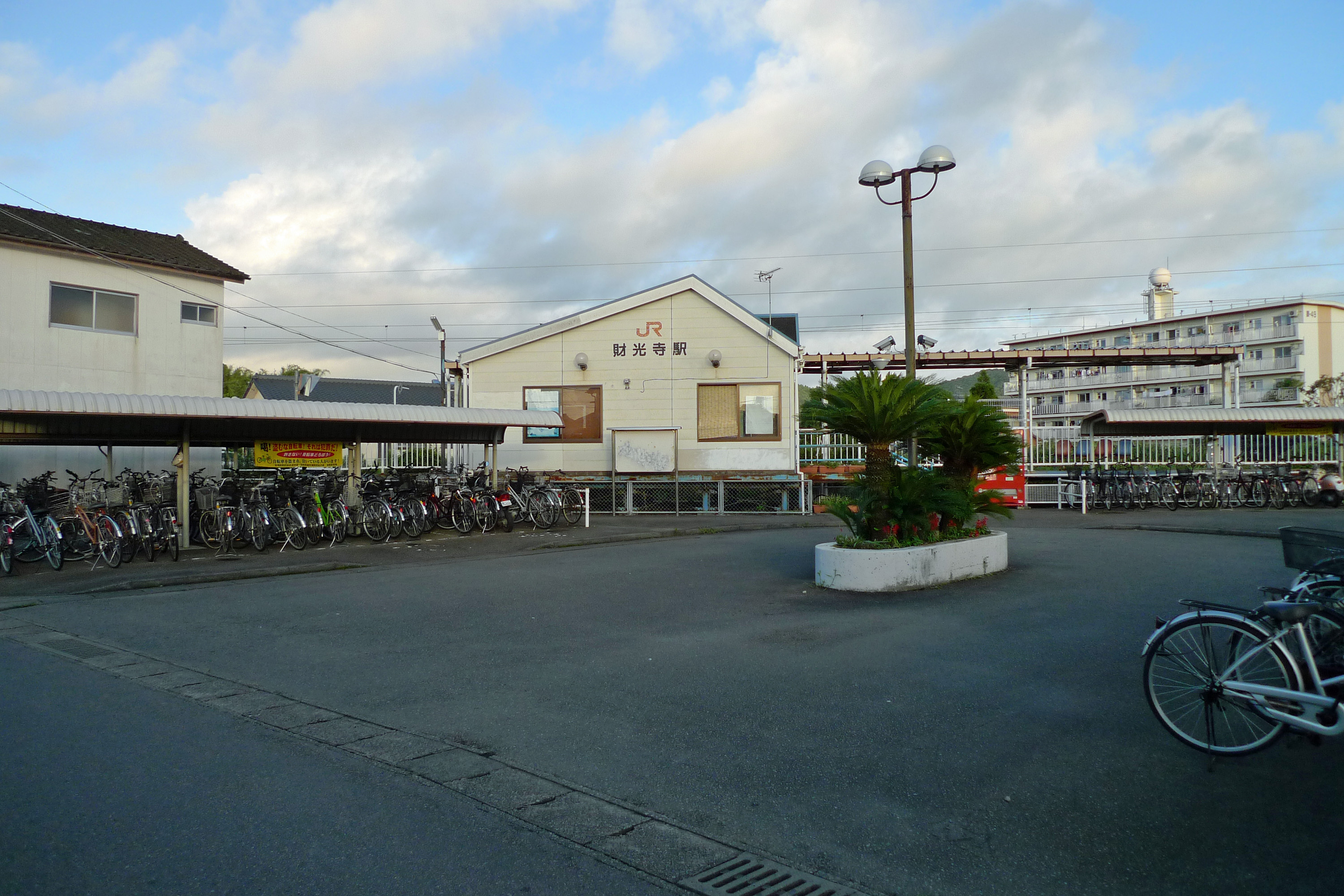
A view of the station forecourt.

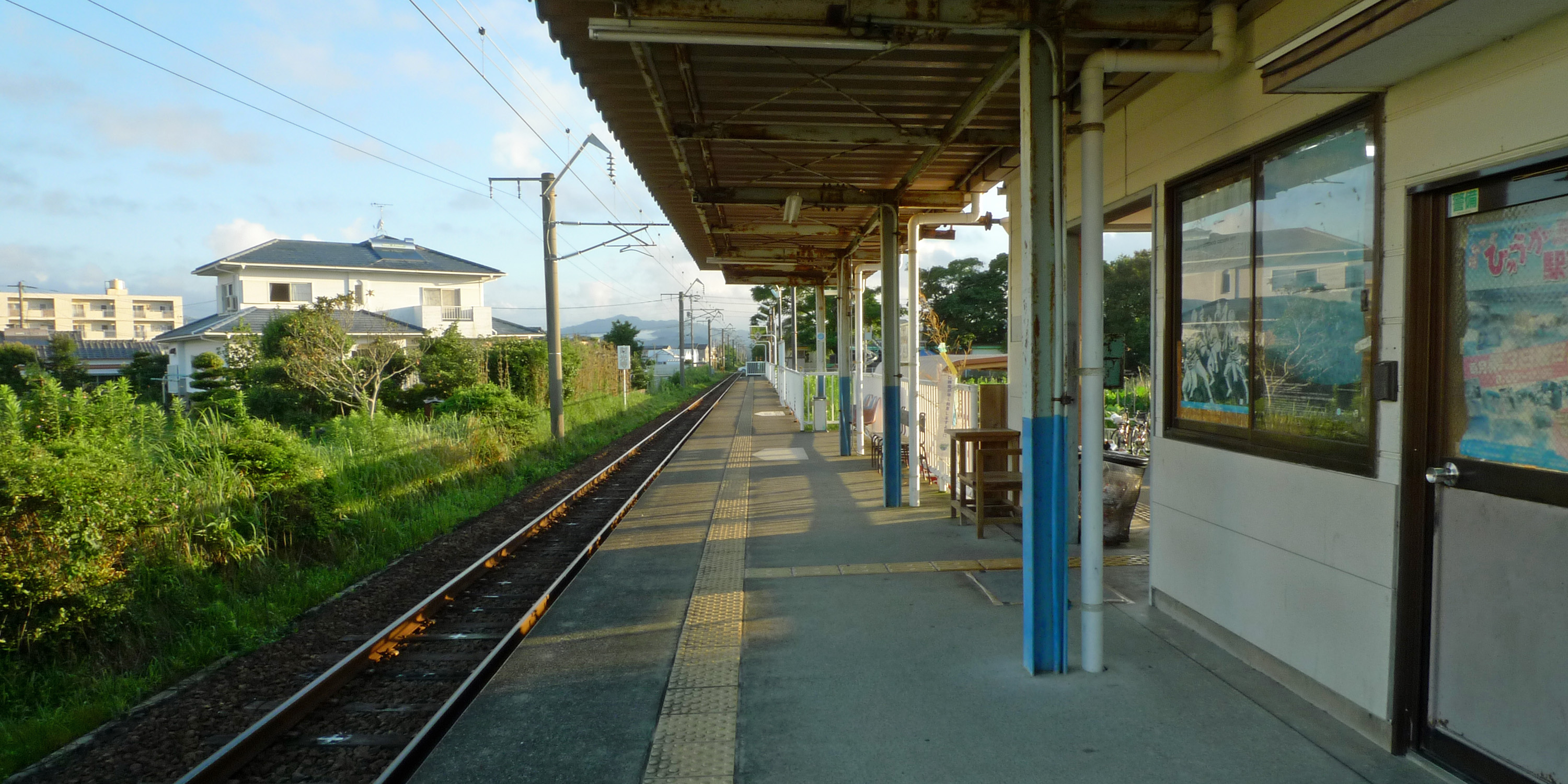
A view of the platform and track.

== History ==
JR Kyushu opened the station on 11 March 1989 as an additional station on the existing track of the Nippō Main Line.

== Passenger statistics ==
In fiscal 2016, the station was used by an average of 265 passengers (boarding only) per day.

== Surrounding area ==
- Miyazaki Prefectural Hyuga High School
- Miyazaki Prefectural Hyuga Technical High School

== See also ==
- List of railway stations in Japan
