= Kita-Nobeoka Station =

Railway station in Nobeoka, Miyazaki Prefecture, Japan

Kita-Nobeoka Station 北延岡駅
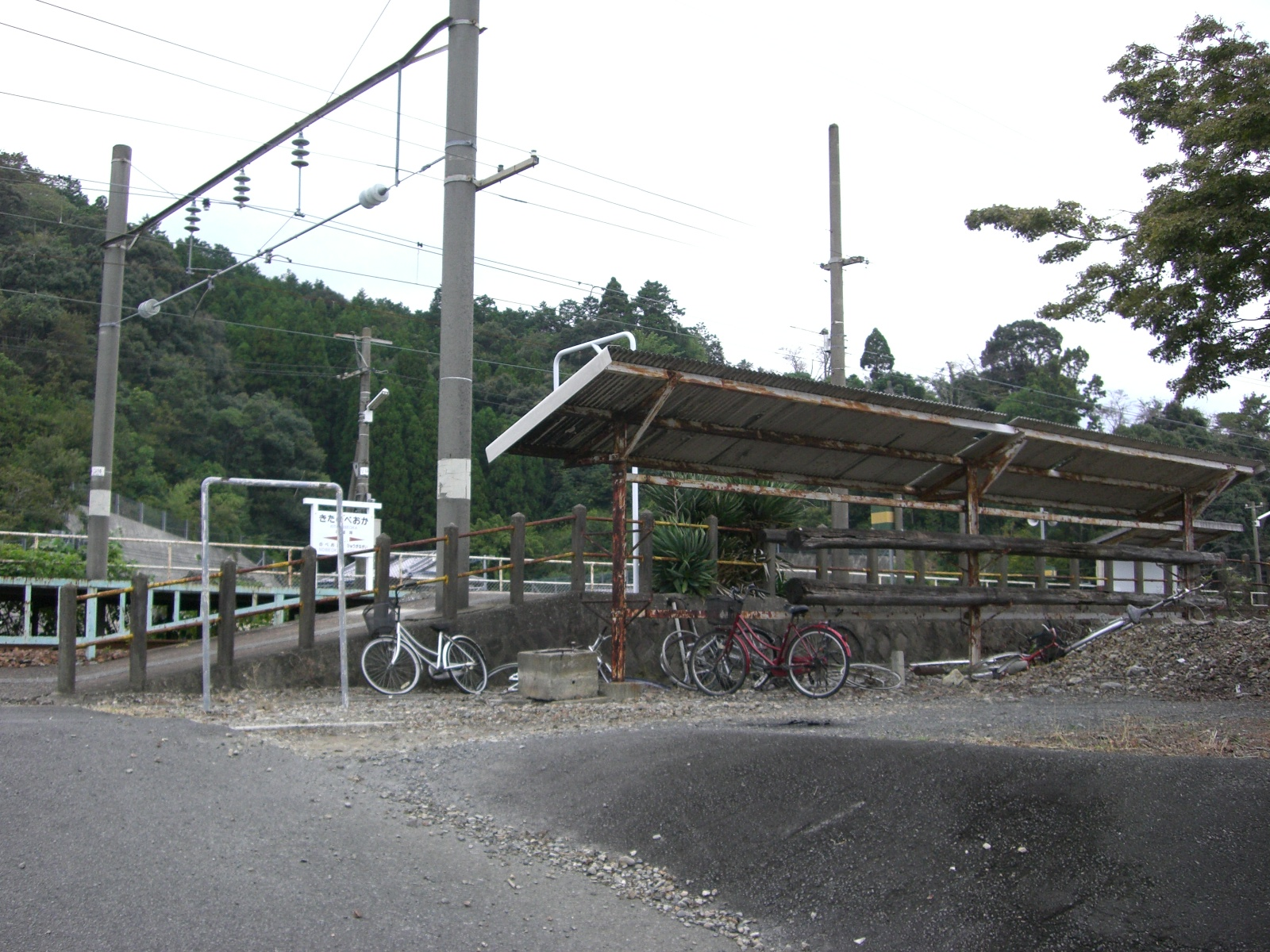
- Kita-Nobeoka Station in 2007

General information
- Location: Sashikinomachi, Nobeoka-shi, Miyazaki-ken 882-0002; Japan
- Coordinates: 32°37′50″N 131°41′24″E
- Operator: JR Kyushu
- Line: ■ Nippō Main Line
- Distance: 251.3 km from Kokura
- Platforms: 2 side platforms
- Tracks: 2

Construction
- Structure type: At grade
- Cycle facilities: Bike shed
- Accessible: No - platforms linked by footbridge

Other information
- Status: Unstaffed
- Website: Official website

History
- Opened: 11 February 1953

Passengers
- FY2016: 4 daily

Services
Preceding station	JR Kyushu	Following station
Nobeoka towards Kagoshima	Nippō Main Line	Hyūga-Nagai towards Kokura
Location
- Location within Miyazaki Prefecture Location within Japan

Kita-Nobeoka Station (北延岡駅, Kita-Nobeoka-eki) is a passenger railway station located in the city of Nobeoka, Miyazaki, Japan. It is operated by of JR Kyushu and is on the Nippō Main Line.

== Lines ==
The station is served by the Nippō Main Line and is located 251.3 km from the starting point of the line at Kokura. Only local trains stop at this station.

== Layout ==
The station consists of two side platforms serving two tracks at grade. There is no station building but weather shelters are provided on the platforms for passengers. Access to the opposite side platform is by a footbridge.

== History ==
Japanese National Railways (JNR) opened the station on 11 February 1953 as an additional station on the existing track of the Nippō Main Line. Baggage handling was abolished in 1972 and the station became unstaffed. With the privatization of JNR on 1 April 1987, the station came under the control of JR Kyushu.

== Passenger statistics ==
In fiscal 2016, the station was used by an average of 4 passengers (boarding only) per day.

== Surrounding area ==
- Nobeoka City Kawashima Elementary School
- Miyazaki Prefectural Nobeoka Commercial High School
- Nobeoka Gakuen High School / Shogakukan Junior High School

== See also ==
- List of railway stations in Japan
