= Kitagawa, Miyazaki =

Dissolved municipality in Miyazaki prefecture, Japan

Coordinates: 32°41′N 131°42′E

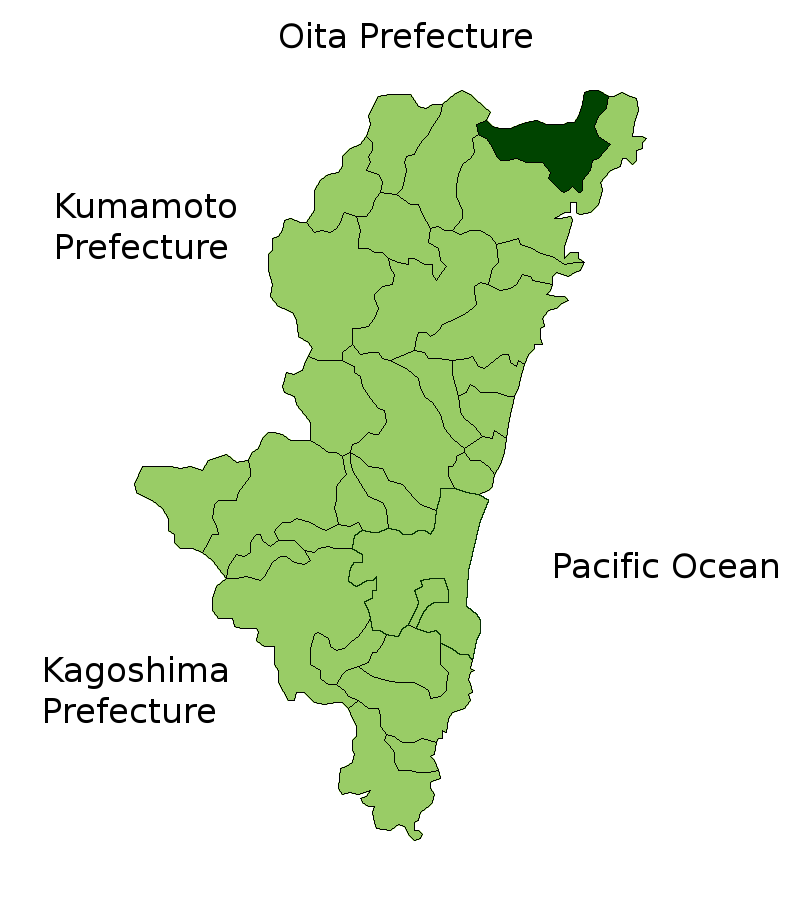
Location of Kitagawa in Miyazaki Prefecture.

Kitagawa (北川町, Kitagawa-chō) was a town located in Higashiusuki District, Miyazaki Prefecture, Japan.

As of 2003, the town had an estimated population of 4,684 and the density of 16.73 persons per km^{2}. The total area was 279.91 km^{2}.

On March 31, 2007, Kitagawa was merged into the expanded city of Nobeoka and no longer exists as an independent municipality.
