= Nippō Main Line =

Railway line in Japan

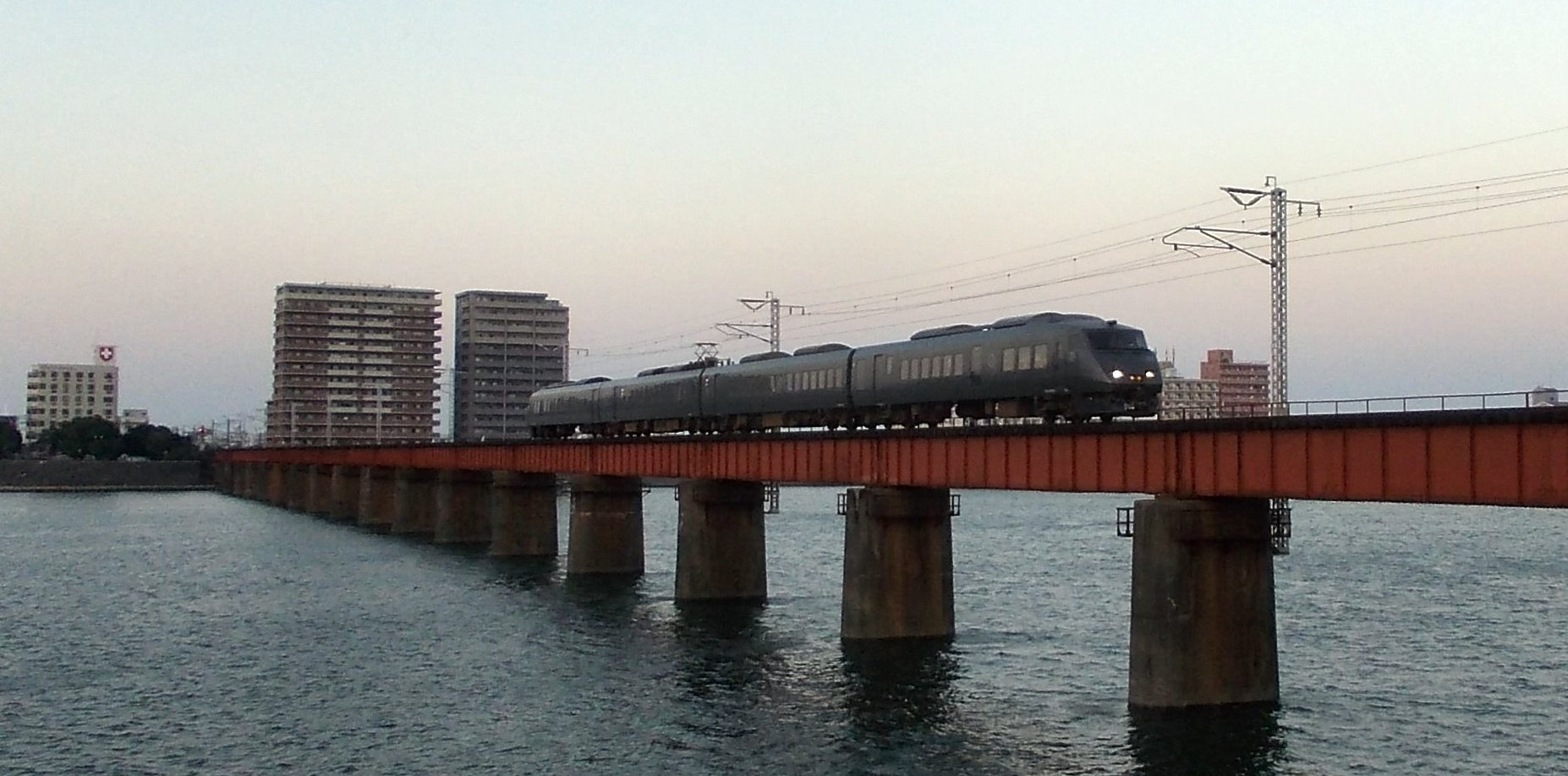
- Kirishima limited express train crossing Ōyodo River, Miyazaki

Overview
- Owner: JR Kyushu
- Locale: Kyushu
- Termini: Kokura; Kagoshima
- Stations: 111

Service
- Type: Heavy rail

History
- Opened: 1895; 131 years ago

Technical
- Line length: 467.2 km (290.3 mi)
- Track gauge: 1,067 mm (3 ft 6 in)
- Electrification: 20 kV AC (60 Hz)
Route map
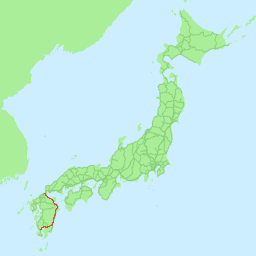

The Nippō Main Line (日豊本線, Nippō-honsen) is a railway line in Kyushu, in southern Japan, operated by Kyushu Railway Company (JR Kyushu). The line connects Kokura Station in Kitakyushu, Fukuoka, and Kagoshima Station in Kagoshima via the east coast of Kyushu, passing through the prefectural capitals of Ōita and Miyazaki. A number of Limited Express trains operate along the route, including Limited Express Sonic trains between Hakata and Oita.

== Stations ==
●: Stops
▲: Rapid service connecting to Hitahikosan Line non-stop,
｜: Non-stop
Liner services: Sawayaka Liner, Home Liner

Numbering	Station		Distance (km)	Rapid	Liner		Transfers	Location	
JF 01	Kokura	小倉	0.0	●			Sanyo Shinkansen; JA Kagoshima Main Line; Kitakyushu Monorail	Kokurakita-ku, Kitakyushu	Fukuoka Prefecture
JF 02	Nishi Kokura	西小倉	0.8	●			JA Kagoshima Main Line	Kokurakita-ku, Kitakyushu	Fukuoka Prefecture
JF 03	Minami Kokura	南小倉	3.5	▲				Kokurakita-ku, Kitakyushu	Fukuoka Prefecture
JF 04	Jōno	城野	6.1	●			JI Hitahikosan Line	Kokuraminami-ku, Kitakyushu	Fukuoka Prefecture
JF 05	Abeyama Kōen	安部山公園	8.4	｜				Kokuraminami-ku, Kitakyushu	Fukuoka Prefecture
JF 06	Shimosone	下曽根	11.6	｜				Kokuraminami-ku, Kitakyushu	Fukuoka Prefecture
JF 07	Kusami	朽網	15.0	｜				Kokuraminami-ku, Kitakyushu	Fukuoka Prefecture
JF 08	Kanda	苅田	18.6	｜				Kanda	Fukuoka Prefecture
JF 09	Obase Nishikōdai-mae	小波瀬西工大前	22.2	｜			Kanda Minato Line (freight)	Kanda	Fukuoka Prefecture
JF 10	Yukuhashi	行橋	25.0	●			■ Heisei Chikuho Railway Tagawa Line	Yukuhashi	Fukuoka Prefecture
	Minami Yukuhashi	南行橋	26.8	｜				Yukuhashi	Fukuoka Prefecture
	Shindenbaru	新田原	30.2	｜				Yukuhashi	Fukuoka Prefecture
	Tsuiki	築城	33.9	●				Chikujō	Fukuoka Prefecture
	Shiida	椎田	36.9	●				Chikujō	Fukuoka Prefecture
	Buzen Shōe	豊前松江	41.8	｜				Buzen	Fukuoka Prefecture
	Unoshima	宇島	45.2	●				Buzen	Fukuoka Prefecture
	Mikekado	三毛門	48.0	｜				Buzen	Fukuoka Prefecture
	Yoshitomi	吉富	50.0	｜				Yoshitomi	Fukuoka Prefecture
	Nakatsu	中津	51.8	●				Nakatsu	Ōita Prefecture
	Higashi Nakatsu	東中津	56.7	●				Nakatsu	Ōita Prefecture
	Imazu	今津	60.1	●				Nakatsu	Ōita Prefecture
	Amatsu	天津	62.5	●				Usa	Ōita Prefecture
	Buzen Zenkōji	豊前善光寺	65.5	●				Usa	Ōita Prefecture
	Yanagigaura	柳ケ浦	69.1	●				Usa	Ōita Prefecture
	Buzen Nagasu	豊前長洲	71.0					Usa	Ōita Prefecture
	Usa	宇佐	75.8					Usa	Ōita Prefecture
	Nishi Yashiki	西屋敷	79.4					Usa	Ōita Prefecture
	Tateishi	立石	85.2					Kitsuki	Ōita Prefecture
	Naka Yamaga	中山香	90.4					Kitsuki	Ōita Prefecture
	Kitsuki	杵築	99.2					Kitsuki	Ōita Prefecture
	Ōga	大神	103.3					Hiji	Ōita Prefecture
	Hiji	日出	107.2					Hiji	Ōita Prefecture
	Yōkoku	暘谷	108.4					Hiji	Ōita Prefecture
	Bungo Toyooka	豊後豊岡	111.3					Hiji	Ōita Prefecture
	Kamegawa	亀川	114.9					Beppu	Ōita Prefecture
	Beppu Daigaku	別府大学	117.0					Beppu	Ōita Prefecture
	Beppu	別府	120.8					Beppu	Ōita Prefecture
	Higashi Beppu	東別府	122.8					Beppu	Ōita Prefecture
	Nishi Ōita	西大分	130.4					Ōita	Ōita Prefecture
	Ōita	大分	132.9				■ Kyūdai Main Line ■ Hōhi Main Line	Ōita	Ōita Prefecture
	Maki	牧	136.2					Ōita	Ōita Prefecture
	Takajō	高城	138.0					Ōita	Ōita Prefecture
	Tsurusaki	鶴崎	141.0					Ōita	Ōita Prefecture
	Ōzai	大在	144.3					Ōita	Ōita Prefecture
	Sakanoichi	坂ノ市	147.4					Ōita	Ōita Prefecture
	Kōzaki	幸崎	151.8					Ōita	Ōita Prefecture
	Sashiu	佐志生	159.0					Usuki	Ōita Prefecture
	Shitanoe	下ノ江	161.0					Usuki	Ōita Prefecture
	Kumasaki	熊崎	164.7					Usuki	Ōita Prefecture
	Kami Usuki	上臼杵	167.6					Usuki	Ōita Prefecture
	Usuki	臼杵	169.2					Usuki	Ōita Prefecture
	Tsukumi	津久見	178.9					Tsukumi	Ōita Prefecture
	Hishiro	日代	184.4					Tsukumi	Ōita Prefecture
	Azamui	浅海井	188.2					Saiki	Ōita Prefecture
	Kariu	狩生	192.0					Saiki	Ōita Prefecture
	Kaizaki	海崎	194.8					Saiki	Ōita Prefecture
	Saiki	佐伯	197.8					Saiki	Ōita Prefecture
	Kamioka	上岡	202.4					Saiki	Ōita Prefecture
	Naomi	直見	208.8					Saiki	Ōita Prefecture
	Naokawa	直川	213.6					Saiki	Ōita Prefecture
	Shigeoka	重岡	224.2					Saiki	Ōita Prefecture
	Sōtarō	宗太郎	231.0					Saiki	Ōita Prefecture
	Ichitana	市棚	238.5					Nobeoka	Miyazaki Prefecture
	Kitagawa	北川	243.2					Nobeoka	Miyazaki Prefecture
	Hyūga Nagai	日向長井	246.7					Nobeoka	Miyazaki Prefecture
	Kita Nobeoka	北延岡	251.3					Nobeoka	Miyazaki Prefecture
	Nobeoka	延岡	256.2		●			Nobeoka	Miyazaki Prefecture
	Minami Nobeoka	南延岡	259.6		●			Nobeoka	Miyazaki Prefecture
	Asahigaoka	旭ケ丘	263.1		｜			Nobeoka	Miyazaki Prefecture
	Totoro	土々呂	265.7		｜			Nobeoka	Miyazaki Prefecture
	Kadogawa	門川	270.0		●			Kadogawa	Miyazaki Prefecture
	Hyūgashi	日向市	276.6		●			Hyūga	Miyazaki Prefecture
	Zaikōji	財光寺	278.9		｜			Hyūga	Miyazaki Prefecture
	Minami Hyūga	南日向	283.1		｜			Hyūga	Miyazaki Prefecture
	Mimitsu	美々津	289.7		｜			Hyūga	Miyazaki Prefecture
	Higashi Tsuno	東都農	294.1		｜			Tsuno	Miyazaki Prefecture
	Tsuno	都農	298.7		●			Tsuno	Miyazaki Prefecture
	Kawaminami	川南	305.6		｜			Kawaminami	Miyazaki Prefecture
	Takanabe	高鍋	313.6		●			Takanabe	Miyazaki Prefecture
	Hyūga Shintomi	日向新富	320.0		｜			Shintomi	Miyazaki Prefecture
	Sadowara	佐土原	326.7		●			Miyazaki	Miyazaki Prefecture
	Hyūga Sumiyoshi	日向住吉	330.9		●			Miyazaki	Miyazaki Prefecture
	Hasugaike	蓮ケ池	334.7		｜			Miyazaki	Miyazaki Prefecture
	Miyazaki Jingū	宮崎神宮	337.4		｜			Miyazaki	Miyazaki Prefecture
	Miyazaki	宮崎	339.9		●	●	■ Nichinan Line ■ Miyazaki Kūkō Line	Miyazaki	Miyazaki Prefecture
	Minami Miyazaki	南宮崎	342.5		●	●	■ Nichinan Line	Miyazaki	Miyazaki Prefecture
	Kanō	加納	345.1			｜		Miyazaki	Miyazaki Prefecture
	Kiyotake	清武	347.8			●		Miyazaki	Miyazaki Prefecture
	Hyūga Kutsukake	日向沓掛	352.5			●		Miyazaki	Miyazaki Prefecture
	Tano	田野	358.0			●		Miyazaki	Miyazaki Prefecture
	Aoidake	青井岳	369.3			｜		Miyakonojō	Miyazaki Prefecture
	Yamanokuchi	山之口	379.1			●		Miyakonojō	Miyazaki Prefecture
	Mochibaru	餅原	382.0			●		Mimata	Miyazaki Prefecture
	Mimata	三股	385.6			●		Mimata	Miyazaki Prefecture
	Miyakonojō	都城	389.9			●	■ Kitto Line	Miyakonojō	Miyazaki Prefecture
	Nishi Miyakonojō	西都城	392.4			●		Miyakonojō	Miyazaki Prefecture
	Isoichi	五十市	395.2					Miyakonojō	Miyazaki Prefecture
	Takarabe	財部	399.4					Soo	Kagoshima Prefecture
	Kitamata	北俣	403.0					Soo	Kagoshima Prefecture
	Ōsumi Ōkawara	大隅大川原	408.1					Soo	Kagoshima Prefecture
	Kita Naganoda	北永野田	413.4					Kirishima	Kagoshima Prefecture
	Kirishima Jingū	霧島神宮	419.4					Kirishima	Kagoshima Prefecture
	Kokubu	国分	432.1					Kirishima	Kagoshima Prefecture
	Hayato	隼人	434.7				■ Hisatsu Line	Kirishima	Kagoshima Prefecture
	Kajiki	加治木	441.6					Aira	Kagoshima Prefecture
	Kinkō	錦江	443.3					Aira	Kagoshima Prefecture
	Chōsa	帖佐	445.5					Aira	Kagoshima Prefecture
	Aira	姶良	447.1					Aira	Kagoshima Prefecture
	Shigetomi	重富	448.7					Aira	Kagoshima Prefecture
	Ryūgamizu	竜ケ水	455.7					Kagoshima	Kagoshima Prefecture
	Sengan-en	仙巌園	460.5					Kagoshima	Kagoshima Prefecture
	Kagoshima	鹿児島	462.6				■ Kagoshima Main Line; Kagoshima City Tram	Kagoshima	Kagoshima Prefecture

Though Kagoshima is the southern terminus for the line, some trains continue via the Kagoshima Main Line to the adjacent Kagoshima-Chūō station.

== History ==
The Kyushu Railway Co. opened the 6 km Kokura - Jono section in 1895, and the Hōshū Railway Co. opened the 46 km Yukuhashi - Buzen Nagasu section in 1897. The former company acquired the latter in 1901, and was nationalised in 1907. The lines were connected in 1909, and extended south to Usa in the same year, the line reaching Beppu and Oita in 1911, Usuki in 1915 and Shigeoka in 1922.

The section from Kagoshima - Hayato opened as part of the Hisatsu line in 1901.

The original rail connection to Miyazaki (via the Kitto Line) opened in 1916, and the line was extended north to Takanabe in 1920, Bibi Tsu in 1921 and connected to the line from Kokura in 1923. The line west of Miyakonojo opened in sections from 1929, connecting to Hayato in 1932.

The 2.8 km Obase - Yukuhashi section was the first to be duplicated in 1956, and the Kokura - Jono section was double-tracked by 1958, continued to Obase by 1965 and extended south to Tateishi by 1983. The Naka Yamaga - Kisuki section was double-tracked between 1977 and 1978, and the Hiji - Oita section between 1966 and 1987.

The 152 km Kokura - Saizaki section was electrified in 1967, extended 191 km to Minami Miyazaki in 1974, and a further 120 km to Kagoshima in 1979.

=== Former connecting lines ===
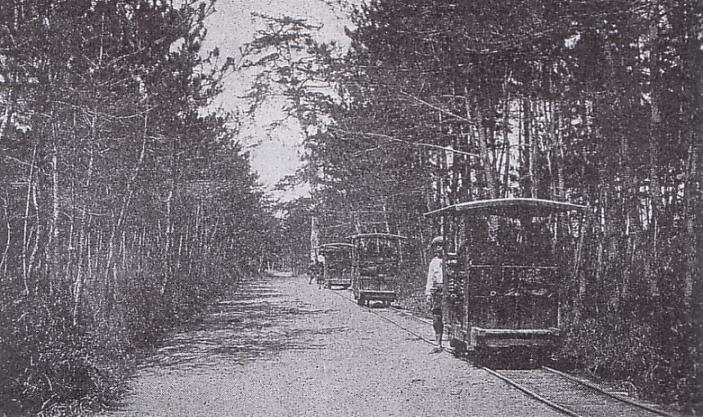
The Beppu Daigaku - Sumiyoshi Shrine 'human' powered line, appears to be ~915mm (~3') gauge

A 3 km 'Kokura Bypass' line (junctioning 2 km north of Kokura on the Kagoshima Main Line) to the Nippo Main Line was opened in 1903, together with another line linking back to the Kagoshima Main Line south of Kokura. The 'Bypass' was built due to the Japanese army expressing concern at the vulnerability of Kokura to enemy naval gunfire. However, following Japan's success in the 1904 Russo-Japanese War, this concern diminished and the Kokura Bypass sections closed in 1911.

- Jono station - The 4 km Nishitetsu Northern Line was built as a 1,067 mm (3 ft 6.0 in) gauge line to Kawaraguchi between 1906/07. It was regauged to 1435mm and electrified at 600 VDC in 1920, and extended from Kawaraguchi to Uomachi (on the Kagoshima Main Line) in 1932. The line closed in 1980.
- Unoshima station - The Yabakei Railway Co. opened the 762 mm (2 ft 6.0 in) gauge 17 km line to Yabakei in sections between 1914 and 1918 and was replaced by a bus service in 1936.

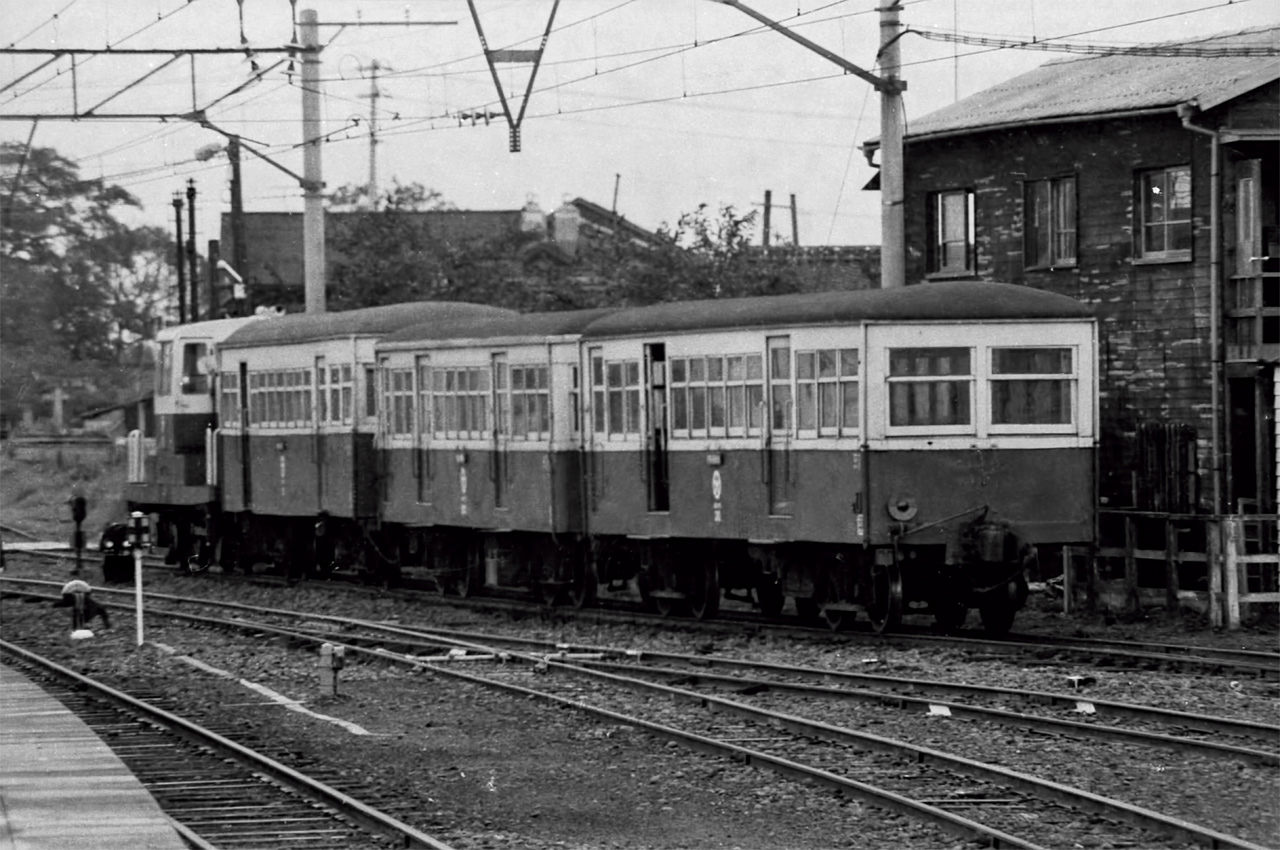
Yabakei Railway train at Nakatsu, ~1975

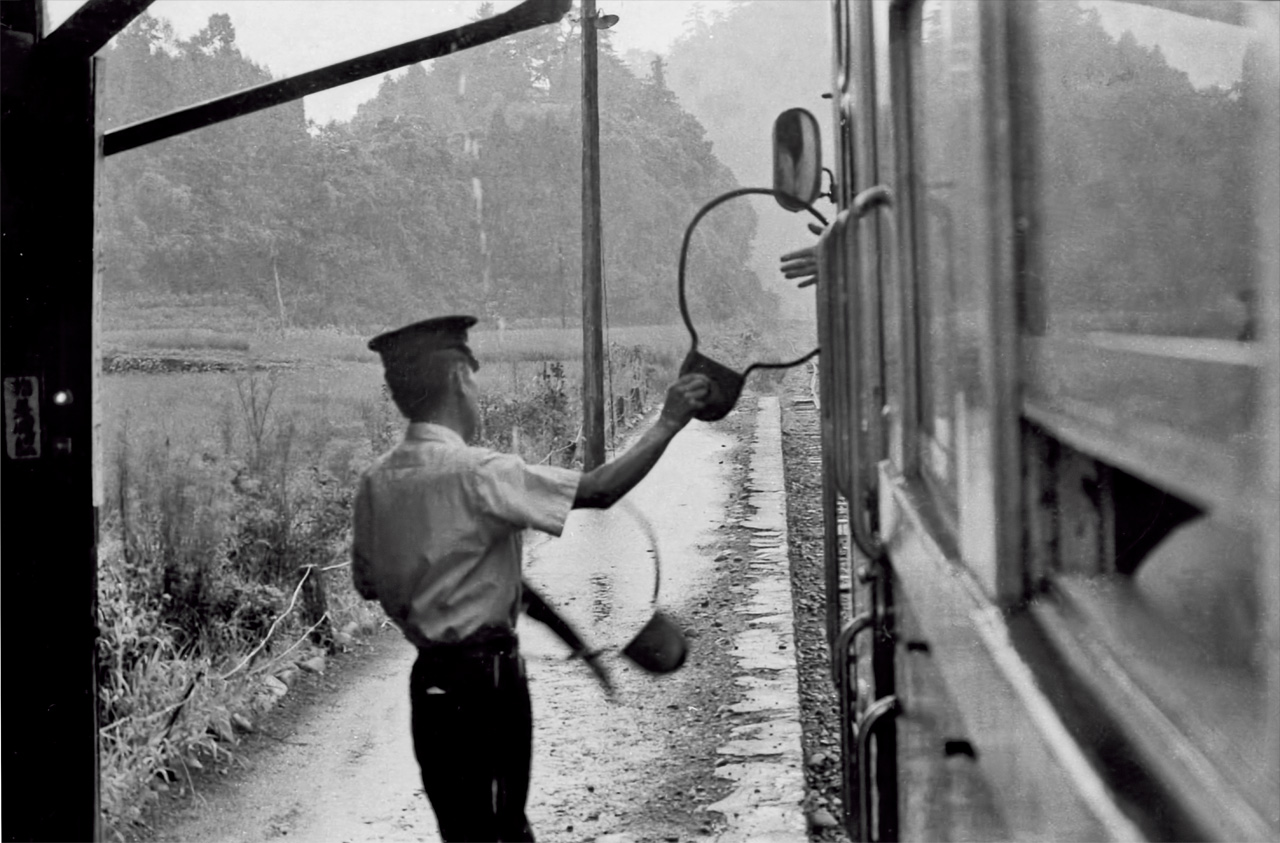
Tablet exchange on the Yabakei Railway, ~1975

- Nakatsu station - The Yabakei Railway Co. also opened the 36 km 762mm gauge line to Morizane Onsen in sections between 1913 and 1924. The line was regauged to 1067mm in 1929. In 1944 the line commenced servicing the Nakatsu Steel works, until it closed in 1966. The 26 km section beyond Noji closed in 1971, with the remainder closing in 1975.
- Buzen Zenkoji station - The 16 km 762mm gauge line to Buzen Futsukaichi opened in 1914/15, and closed in 1951 as a result of bridge damage caused by Typhoon Ruth.
- Usa station - The 9 km line from Bungotakada to Usa Hachiman, including a connection to and overpass of the Nippo Main line at Usa, opened in 1916, closing in 1965.
- Kitsuki station - The 30 km line to Kunisaki line was opened in sections between 1922 and 1935. A planned extension to Bungotakada was not built. Typhoon damage to bridges in 1961 saw the line formally closed in 1965.
- Beppu Daigaku station - the Miyazaki Prefectural government built a human powered 1.7 km line of unknown gauge to the Sumiyoshi shrine in 1914. It closed in 1929.
- Nishi Oita station - The 2 km freight line to Oita Minato operated 1911–1984.
- Saizaki station - The Nippon Mining Co. opened a 9 km 762mm gauge line to Nikko Saganoseki in 1946. Passenger services commenced in 1948, freight service ceased in 1960 and the line closed in 1963.

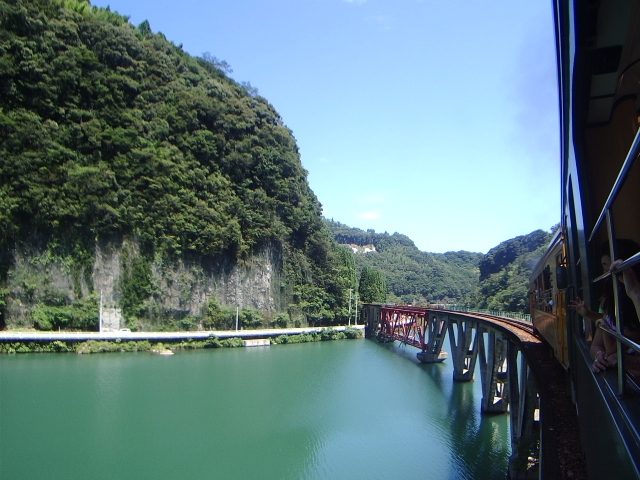
Segawa bridge on the Takachiho line

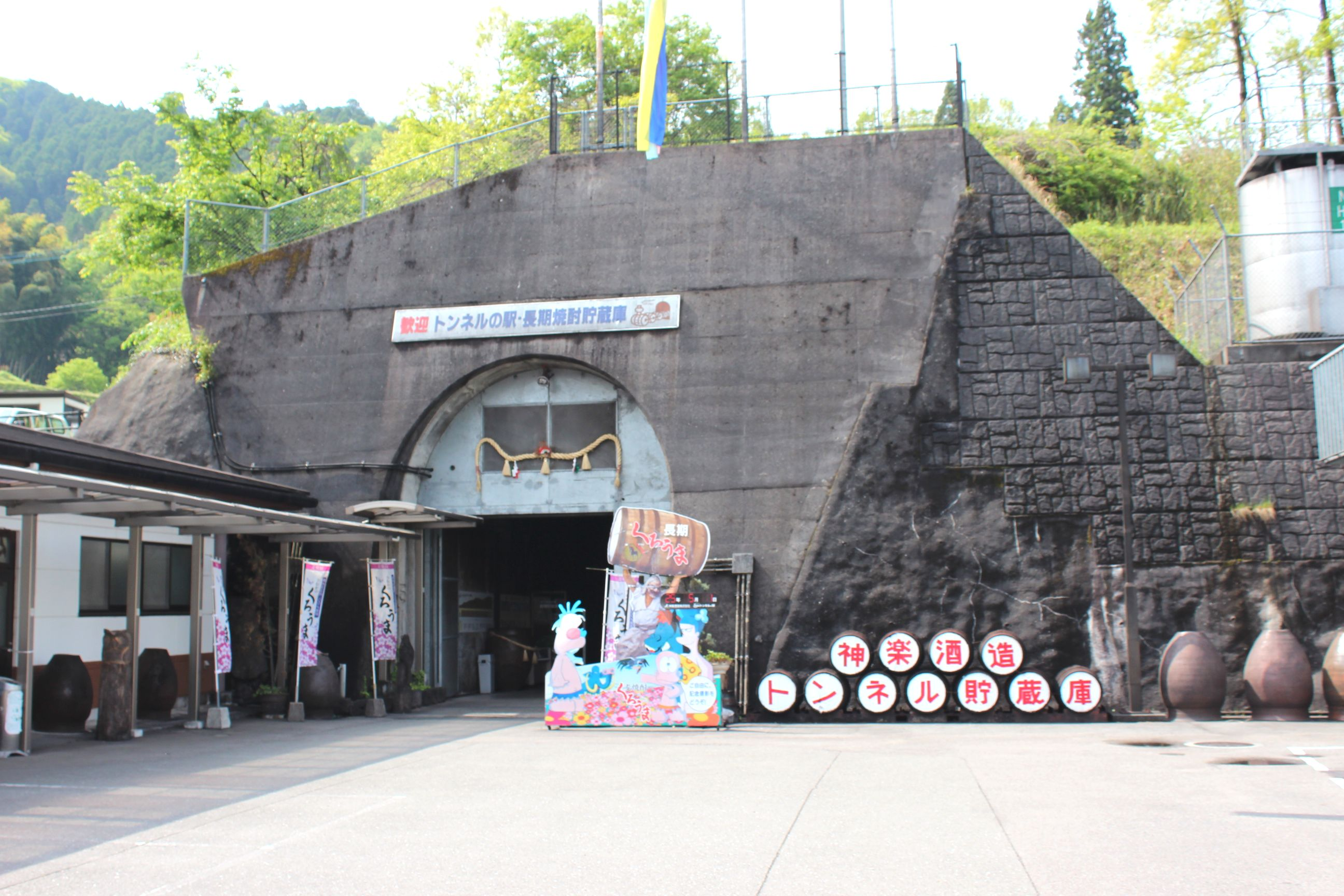
Kuzuhara tunnel at Takachiho on the uncompleted line to Takamori

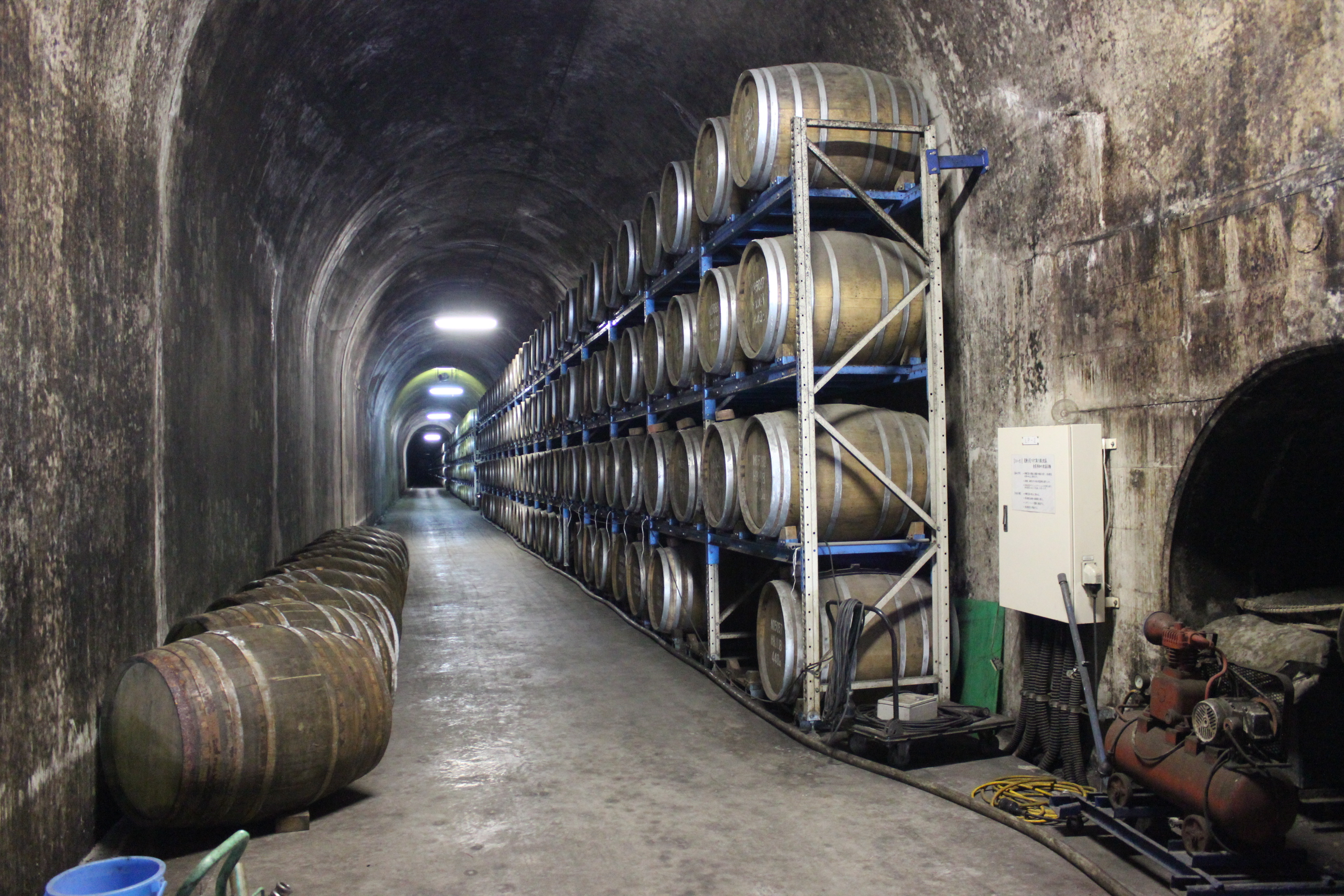
Kuzuhara tunnel now being used as a sake storage area

- Nobeoka station - The 50 km line to Takachiho was opened to Hinokage (38 km) between 1935 and 1939, and to Takachiho in 1972. Construction of the 27 km section to the Takamori line continued until 1977, when flooding 2050m into the 6500m Takamori tunnel (16 km north of Takachiho) resulted in work being suspended. Construction was formally abandoned in 1980, after 30% of the line had been constructed. Freight service ceased in 1974, and in 1982 all service was suspended for four months due to Typhoon damage. In 1989 the line was transferred to the Third Sector Takachiho Railway, which operated until the line was extensively damaged by a typhoon in 2005, formal closure occurring in 2008.
- Hyuga station - The 3.5 km line to Hoso-to Port opened in 1921. Passenger services ceased in 1972 and the line closed in 1993.
- Sadowara station - The 19 km line to Hokita opened in 1922. Freight services ceased in 1972 and the line closed in 1984.
- Nishi Miyakonojo station - The 39 km line to Shibushi opened between 1923 and 1925, connecting to the Nichinan Line. Freight service ended in 1983 and the line closed in 1987.
- Kokubo station - The 98 km line to Shibushi, also connecting to the Nichinan Line, was not completed until 1972. The first section was opened by the Osumi Light Railway Co. as a 762mm gauge line from Funama to Kushira, via a reversing station at Kanoya, between 1915 and 1923. The line was nationalised in 1935, the same year the Shibushi - Higashikushira line was opened by JR. The 1 km connection to Kushira opened the following year, and in 1938 the Kushira - Funama section was regauged, with a new station at Kanoya removing the need to reverse direction there. The Funama - Kaigata section opened in 1961 as a passenger only line, and the Kaigata - Kokubu section also opened without freight service. The rest of the line lost freight service in 1982, and the entire line closed in 1987.

=== Accidents ===
On September 17, 2006, at 14:05, the Nichirin Number 9 train on the Nippo Line derailed near Minami-Nobeoka Station, causing some injuries.
