= Asahigaoka Station (Miyazaki) =

Railway station in Nobeoka, Miyazaki Prefecture, Japan

Asahigaoka Station 旭ヶ丘駅
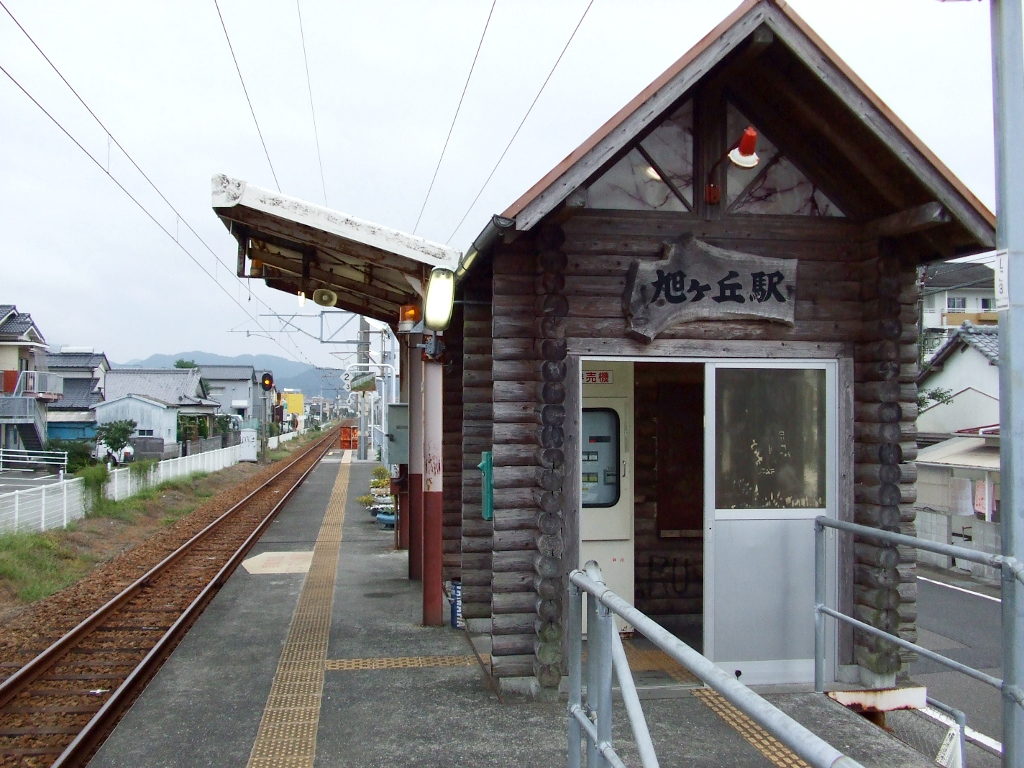
- Asahigaoka Station in 2007

General information
- Location: 6 Chome Asahigaoka, Nobeoka-shi, Miyazaki-ken 889-0507; Japan
- Coordinates: 32°31′41″N 131°40′53″E
- Operator: JR Kyushu
- Line: ■ Nippō Main Line
- Distance: 263.1 km from Kokura
- Platforms: 1 side platform
- Tracks: 1

Construction
- Structure type: At grade
- Cycle facilities: Designated parking area for bikes
- Accessible: No - steps to platform

Other information
- Status: Unstaffed
- Website: Official website

History
- Opened: 13 March 1988

Passengers
- FY2016: 131 daily

Services
Preceding station	JR Kyushu	Following station
Totoro towards Kagoshima	Nippō Main Line local	Minami-Nobeoka towards Kokura
Location
- Location within Miyazaki Prefecture Location within Japan

Asahigaoka Station (旭ヶ丘駅, Asahigaoka-eki) is a passenger railway station located in the city of Nobeoka, Miyazaki, Japan. It is operated by JR Kyushu and is on the Nippō Main Line.

== Lines ==
The station is served by the Nippō Main Line and is located 263.1 km from the starting point of the line at Kokura. Only local trains stop at this station.

== Layout ==
The station consists of a side platform serving a single track at grade. The station building is a simple shed built in log cabin style which serves only to house a waiting area and automatic ticket machine.

== History ==
JR Kyushu opened the station on 13 March 1988 as an additional station on the existing track of the Nippō Main Line.

== Passenger statistics ==
In fiscal 2016, the station was used by an average of 131 passengers (boarding only) per day.

== Surrounding area ==
- Nobeoka City Ichigaoka Elementary School
- Japan National Route 10

== See also ==
- List of railway stations in Japan
