= Minami-Nobeoka Station =

Railway station in Nobeoka, Miyazaki Prefecture, Japan

Minami-Nobeoka Station 南延岡駅
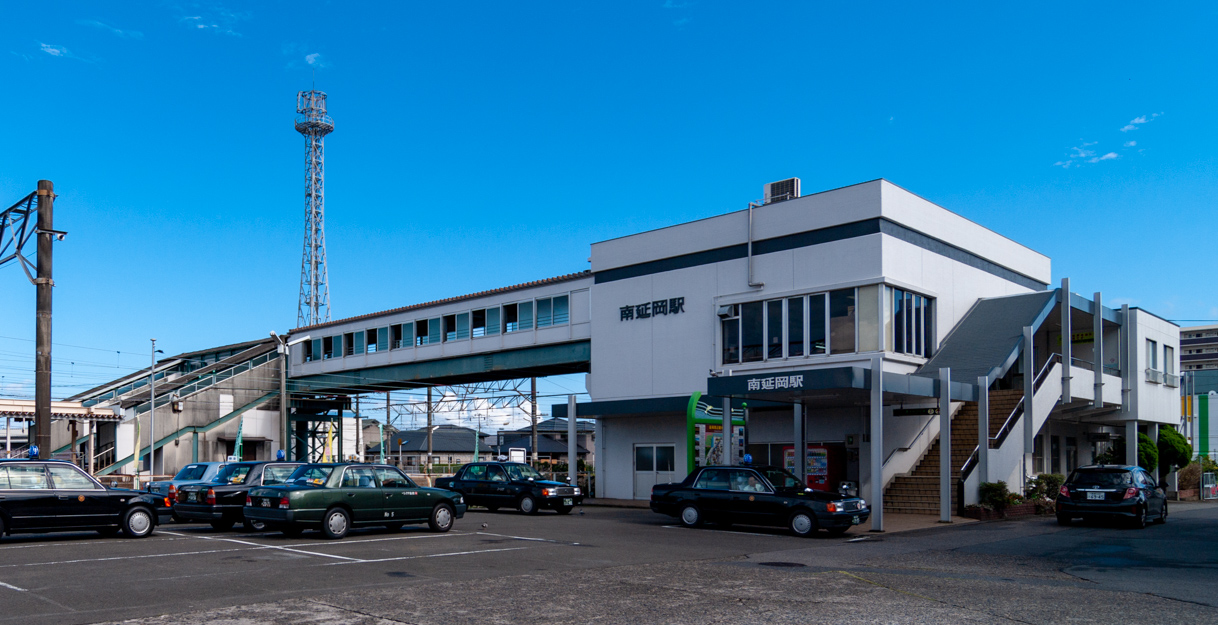
- Minami-Nobeoka Station in 2012

General information
- Location: Hamamachi, Nobeoka-shi, Miyazaki-ken 882-0862; Japan
- Coordinates: 32°33′34″N 131°40′36″E
- Operator: JR Kyushu JR Freight
- Line: ■ Nippō Main Line
- Distance: 259.6 km from Kokura
- Platforms: 1 side + 1 island platform
- Tracks: 3 + multiple sidings

Construction
- Structure type: At grade
- Parking: Available
- Cycle facilities: Designated parking area for bikes

Other information
- Status: Staffed (Midori no Madoguchi)
- Website: Official website

History
- Opened: 11 February 1922

Passengers
- FY2016: 837 daily
- Rank: 187th (among JR Kyushu stations)

Services
Preceding station	JR Kyushu	Following station
Hyūgashi towards Kagoshima	Nippō Main Line Nichirin Express	Nobeoka towards Kokura
Asahigaoka towards Kagoshima	Nippō Main Line local	Nobeoka towards Kokura
Location
- Location within Miyazaki Prefecture Location within Japan

Minami-Nobeoka Station (南延岡駅, Minami-Nobeoka-eki) is a railway station in Nobeoka, Miyazaki, Japan. It is operated by JR Kyushu and is on the Nippō Main Line. It is also a freight depot for JR Freight.

== Lines ==
The station is served by the Nippō Main Line and is located 259.6 km from the starting point of the line at Kokura.

== Layout ==
The station consists of a side platform and an island platform serving three tracks at grade set within a largely industrial area. The platforms are connected by an elevated station building. A Midori no Madoguchi staffed ticket office and waiting area are located on the second level. After the ticket gate, a short flight of steps leads up to concourse which gives access to the platforms. Multiple sidings, mostly for freight trains, are located east and west of the platforms. On the west side, among the sidings, a private leased line branches off towards the industrial plant of the Asahi Kasei chemical corporation.

Management of the passenger facilities at the station has been outsourced to the JR Kyushu Tetsudou Eigyou Co., a wholly owned subsidiary of JR Kyushu specialising in station services. It staffs the ticket window which is equipped with a Midori no Madoguchi facility.

=== Platforms ===
1	■ ■ Nippō Main Line	for Nobeoka and Oita
2, 3	■ ■ Nippō Main Line	for Miyazaki and Miyazaki Airport

== History ==
In 1913, the Miyazaki Prefectural Railway (宮崎県営鉄道) had opened a line from Miyazaki northwards to Hirose (now closed). After the Miyazaki Prefectural Railway was nationalized on 21 September 1917, Japanese Government Railways (JGR) undertook the subsequent extension of the track as part of the then Miyazaki Main Line, reaching Tomitaka (now Hyūgashi) by 11 October 1921. In the next phase of expansion, the track was extended to Minami-Nobeoka, which opened as the new northern terminus on 11 February 1922. It became a through-station on 1 May 1922 when the track was extended to Nobeoka. Expanding north in phases and joining up with other networks, the track eventually reached Kokura and the entire stretch from Kokura through this station to Miyakonojō was redesignated as the Nippō Main Line on 15 December 1923. With the privatization of Japanese National Railways (JNR), the successor of JGR, on 1 April 1987, the station came under the control of JR Kyushu.

== Passenger statistics ==
In fiscal 2016, the station was used by an average of 837 passengers daily (boarding passengers only), and it ranked 187th among the busiest stations of JR Kyushu.

== JR Freight operations ==
The JR Freight depot handles container cargo that departs from and arrives at the dedicated freight lines. There is a dedicated line leading to Asahi Kasei (formerly Asahi Kasei Chemicals factory), and liquefied chlorine is shipped using container cars and tank containers. The main transportation was for the Mitsui Chemicals Omuta Factory, which is connected to Omuta Station, but rail transportation for the factory ended in May 2020. From the north side, a dedicated line leads to the Asahi Kasei Atago factory, and container cars also enter the line.

== Surrounding area ==
- Miyazaki Prefectural Nobeoka Technical High School
- Nobeoka City Minami Elementary School
- Miyazaki Prefectural Nobeoka Hospital
- Japan National Route 10

== See also ==
- List of railway stations in Japan
