= Hyūgashi Station =

Railway station in Hyūga, Miyazaki Prefecture, Japan

Hyūgashi Station 日向市駅
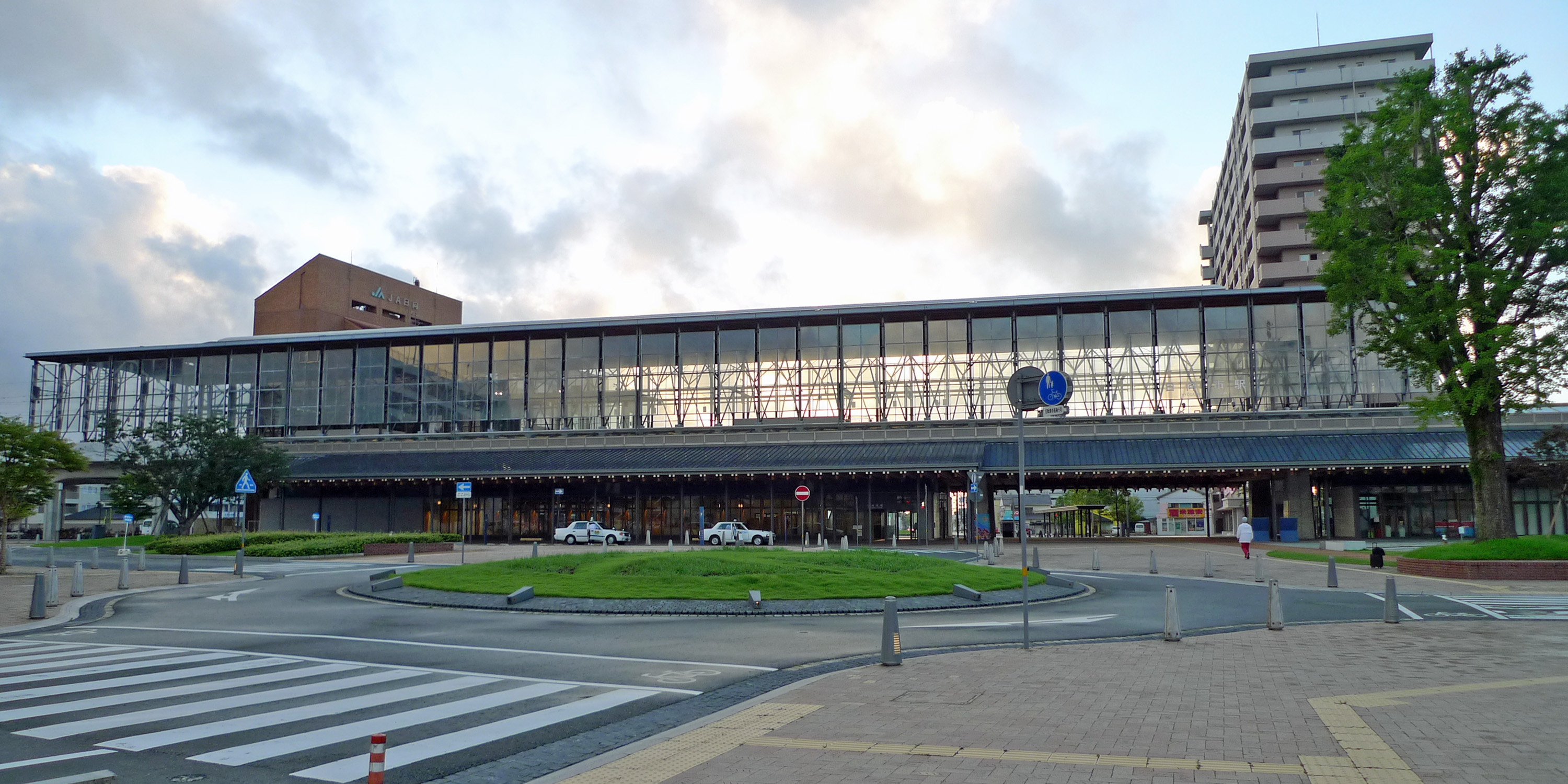
- The station building in July 2010

General information
- Location: 1 Uemachi, Hyūga-shi, Miyazaki-ken 883-0044; Japan
- Coordinates: 32°25′33″N 131°37′40″E
- Operator: JR Kyushu
- Line: ■ Nippō Main Line
- Distance: 276.7 km from Kokura
- Platforms: 1 island platform
- Connections: Bus terminal

Construction
- Structure type: elevated
- Accessible: Yes

Other information
- Status: Staffed (Midori no Madoguchi)
- Website: Official website

History
- Opened: 11 October 1921
- Former names: Tomitaka Station (1921-1963)

Passengers
- FY2016: 1405 daily

Services
Preceding station	JR Kyushu	Following station
Zaikōji towards Kagoshima	Nippō Main Line Nichirin Express	Kadogawa towards Kokura
Zaikōji towards Kagoshima	Nippō Main Line Hyūga Express	Kadogawa towards Kokura
Zaikōji towards Kagoshima	Nippō Main Line local	Kadogawa towards Kokura
Location
- Location within Miyazaki Prefecture Location within Japan

Hyūgashi Station (日向市駅, Hyūgashi-eki) is a passenger railway station located in the city of Hyūga, Miyazaki, Japan. It is operated by JR Kyushu and is on the Nippō Main Line. Hyūgashi Station is located at the heart of Hyuga, Miyazaki. The current station is a timber-steel hybrid structure built in 2008 by Naito Architecture & Associates. It was built as a functional train station and also with the intention of being a symbol of the city.

== Lines ==
The station is served by the Nippō Main Line and is located 276.7 km from the starting point of the line at Kokura.

== Layout ==
The station consists of an island platform serving two tracks at grade. The station building was constructed over a period of more than 10 years with the cooperation of architecture and urban experts, railway officials, government officials, and citizens, including architect Hiroshi Naito and Osamu Shinohara of the University of Tokyo. Cedar was used because there was a strong request from the local community for it to be used, and although it is an elevated station, it is built to resemble a wooden structure. In September 2008, the station building won the Grand Prize at the Brunel Award, an international design contest related to railways. This is the first time in Japan that a station building has won this award. In addition, the redevelopment of the area around the station won the grand prize in the urban space category of the Ministry of Land, Infrastructure, Transport and Tourism's 2014 Urban Landscape Award. The station has a Midori no Madoguchi staffed ticket office.

=== Platforms ===
1	■ ■ Nippō Main Line	for Nobeoka and Oita
2	■ ■ Nippō Main Line	for Miyazaki and Miyazaki Airport

== History ==
The station opened on 11 October 1921 as Tomitaka Station (富高駅) on the Japanese Government Railways (JGR). It was renamed Hyūgashi Station on 25 May 1963. With the privatization of Japanese National Railways (JNR) on 1 April 1987, the station came under the control of JR Kyushu. Freight operations were suspended from 1989 and the freight tracks were abolished in 1993.

In September 2024, the station was temporarily renamed to Hinatazaka46 Station (日向坂46駅) to commemorate the Hinata Fes event by the music group Hinatazaka46, held on 7–8 September.

== Passenger statistics ==
In fiscal 2016, the station was used by an average of 1405 passengers daily (boarding passengers only).

== Surrounding area ==
The area in and around the station is regularly used for events and festivals.

- Japan National Route 10

== See also ==
- List of railway stations in Japan
