= Nobeoka Station =

Railway station in Nobeoka, Miyazaki Prefecture, Japan

Nobeoka Station 延岡駅
- The present station building, which opened in August 2017, in June 2026

General information
- Location: 3-chome Saiwaimachi, Nobeoka-shi, Miyazaki-ken 882-0053; Japan
- Coordinates: 32°35′23″N 131°40′20″E
- Operator: JR Kyushu JR Freight
- Line: ■ Nippō Main Line
- Distance: 256.2 km from Kokura
- Platforms: 1 side + 1 island platform
- Connections: Bus terminal

Construction
- Accessible: yes

Other information
- Status: Staffed (Midori no Madoguchi)
- Website: Official website

History
- Opened: 1 May 1922

Passengers
- FY2016: 1195 daily

Services
Preceding station	JR Kyushu	Following station
Minami-Nobeoka towards Kagoshima	Nippō Main Line Nichirin Express	Saiki towards Kokura
Terminus	Nippō Main Line Hyūga Express	Miyazaki Airport towards Kokura
Minami-Nobeoka towards Kagoshima	Nippō Main Line local	Kita-Nobeoka towards Kokura
Location
- Location within Miyazaki Prefecture Location within Japan

Nobeoka Station (延岡駅, Nobeoka-eki) is a railway station in the city of Nobeoka, Miyazaki, Japan. It is operated by JR Kyushu, and is the main station for the city. It is also a freight depot for JR Freight.

== Lines ==
Nobeoka Station is served by the Nippō Main Line and is located 256.2 km from the starting point of the line at Kokura. The station was also the terminus of the Takachiho Railway until 2007.

== Layout ==
The station consists of a side platform and an island platform and several siding tracks. The platforms are connected by footbridges with elevators. Platform 1 is directly connected to the station building, and is a short platform which an accommodate only trains of six carriages in length or shorter. The station has a Midori no Madoguchi staffed ticket office. A poem written by Wakayama Bokusui, who attended Nobeoka Junior High School (currently Miyazaki Prefectural Nobeoka High School) is written on a large pillar at the entrance of the station building, and the illustration on the station name sign depicts an Ayu sweetfish crossing the Gokase River.

=== Platforms ===
1	■ ■ Nippō Main Line	for Saiki and Oita
1	■ ■ Nippō Main Line	for Miyazaki and Miyazaki Airport
2	■ ■ Nippō Main Line	for Miyazaki and Miyazaki Airport

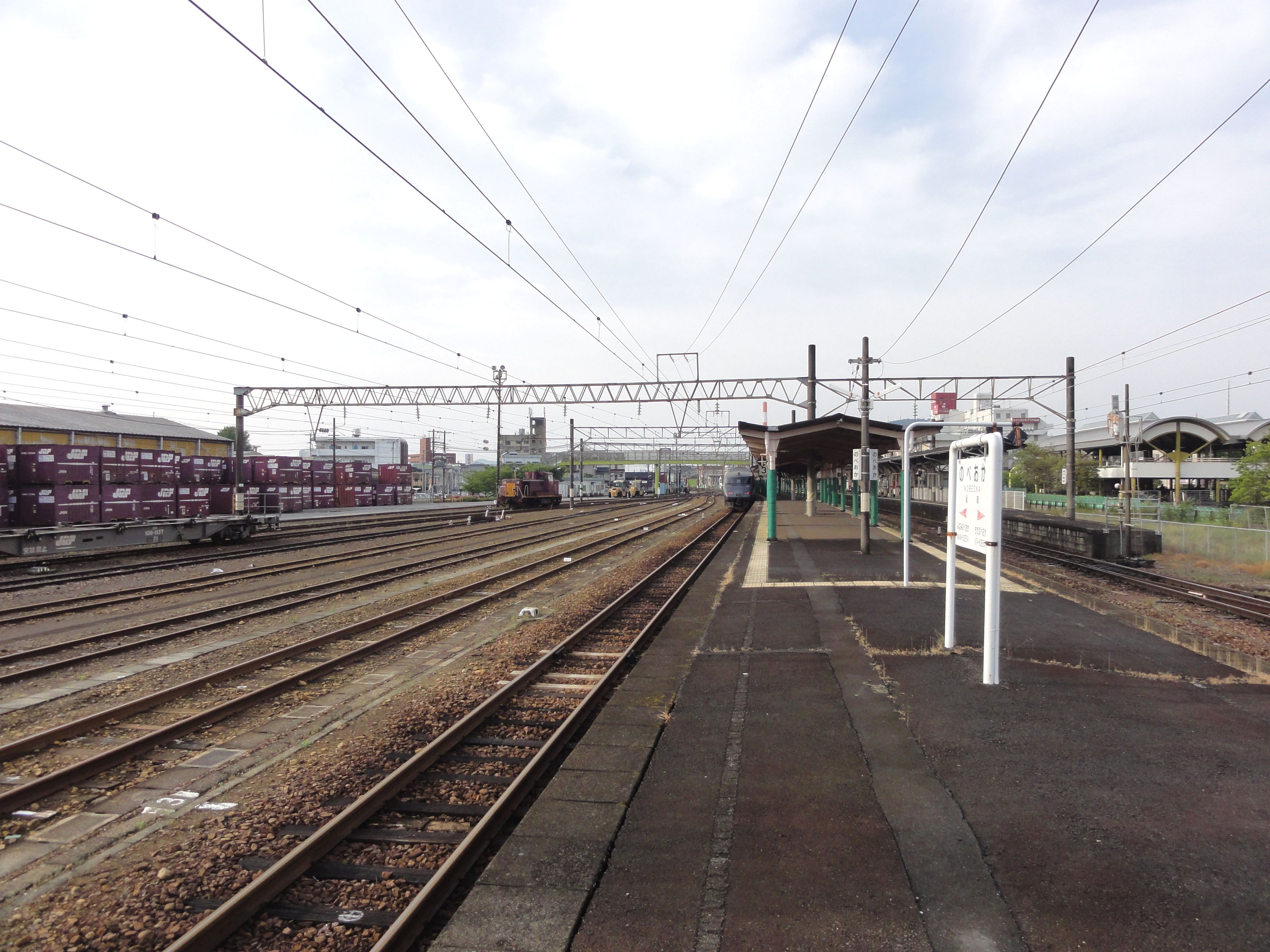
Nobeoka Station platforms in May 2013

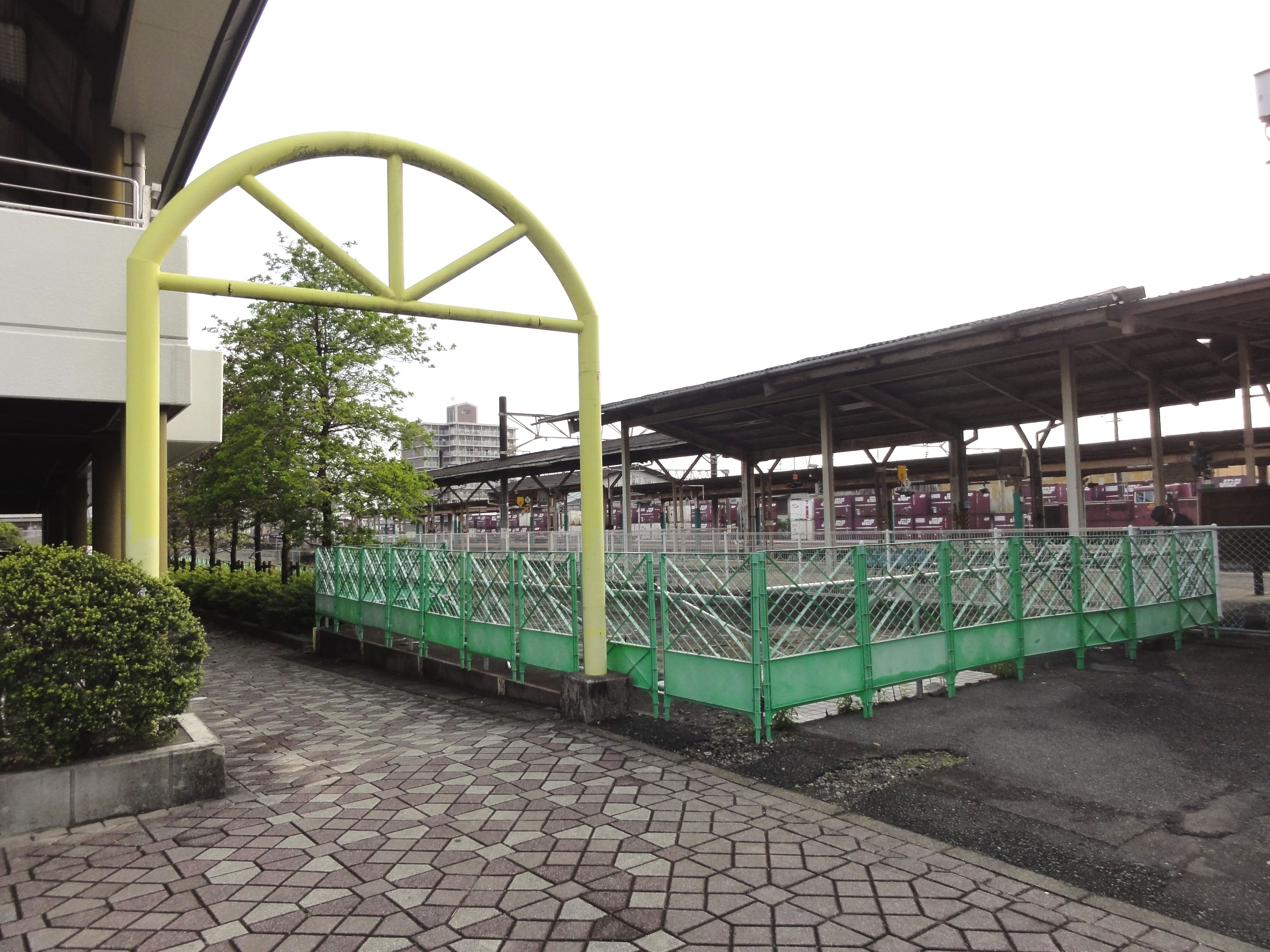
The former Takachiho Railway platform in May 2013

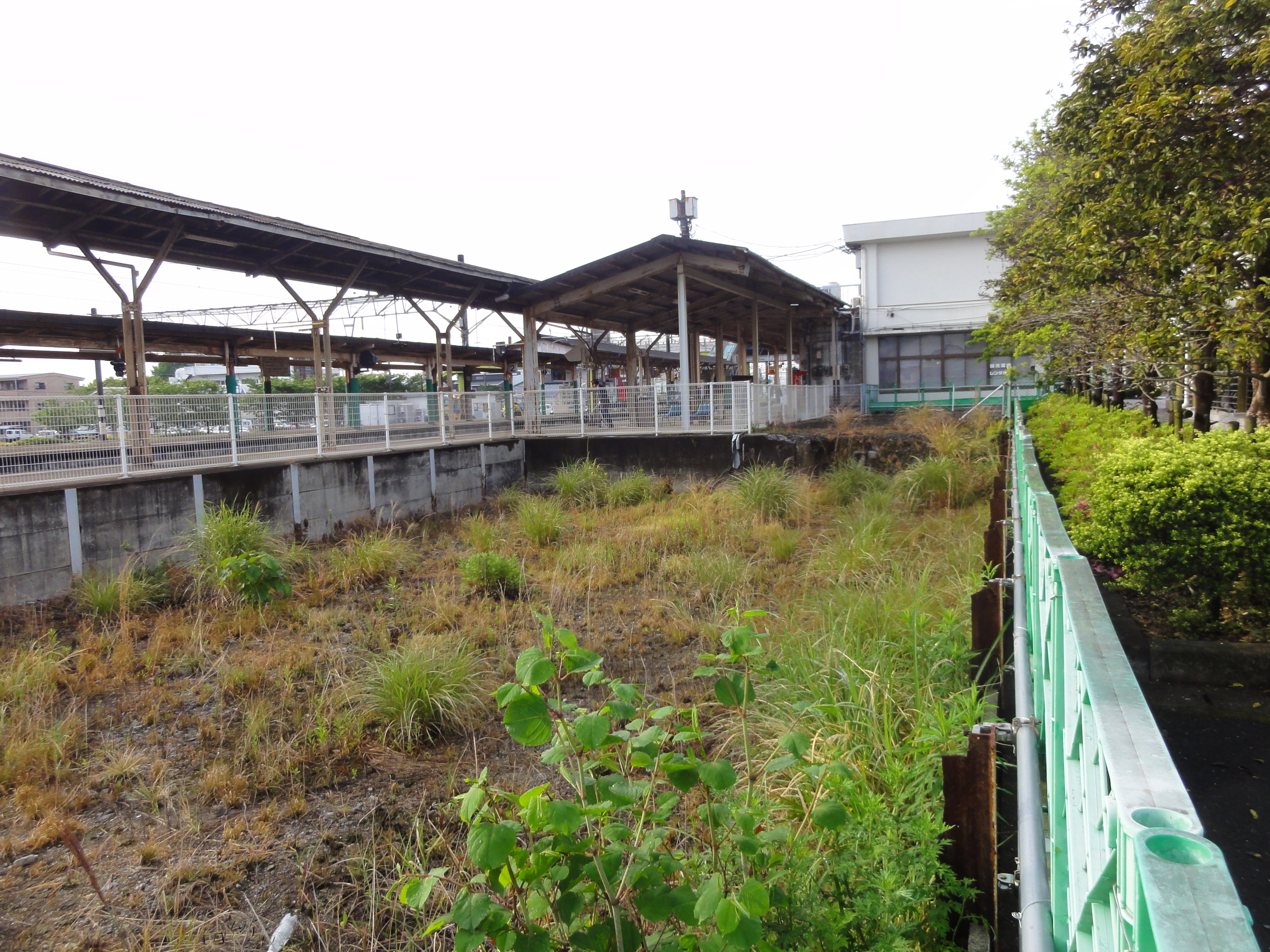
Trackbed at the former Takachiho Railway platform in May 2013

== History ==
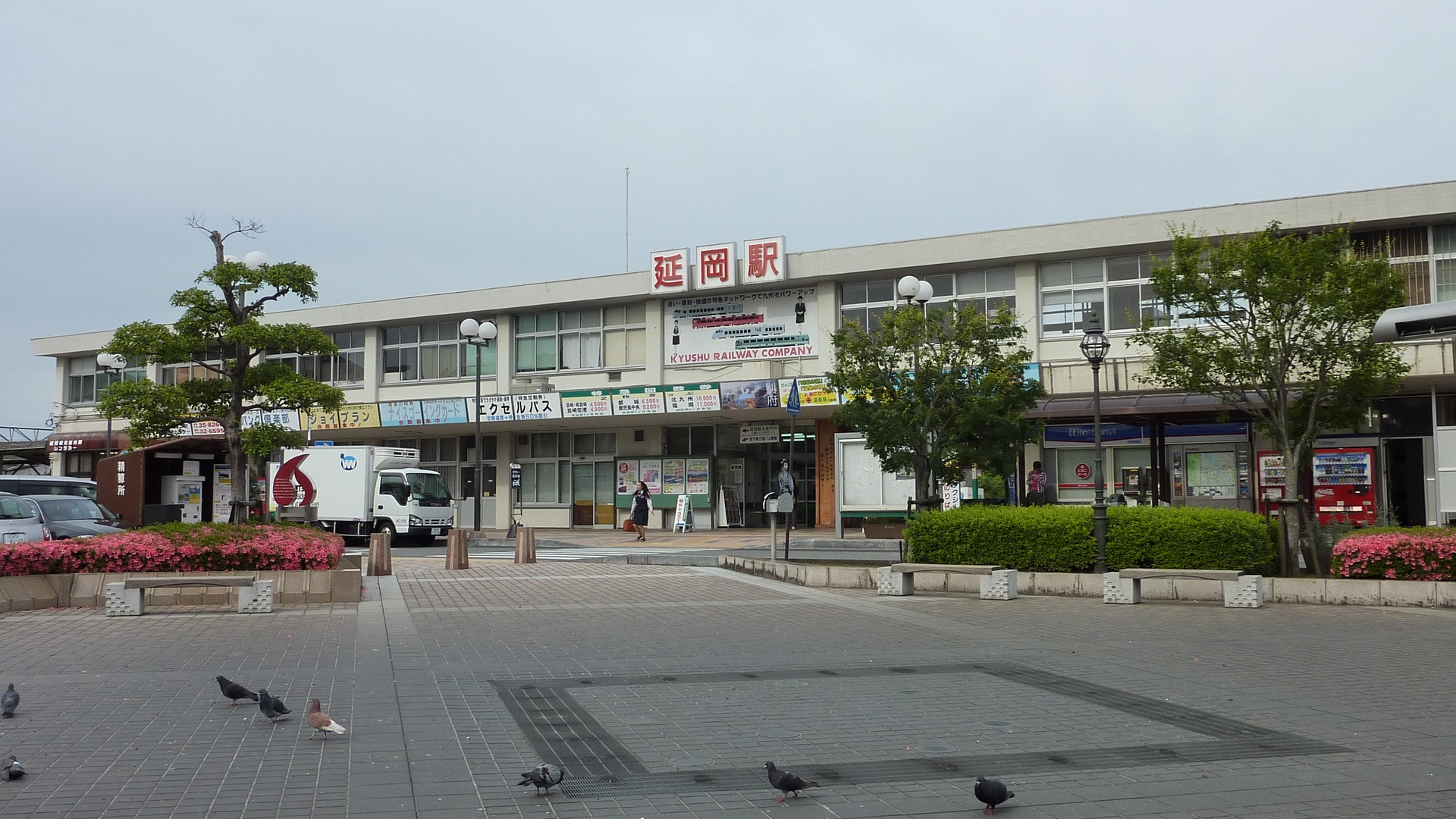
Former station building in May 2010

In 1913, the Miyazaki Prefectural Railway (宮崎県営鉄道) had opened a line from Miyazaki northwards to Hirose (now closed). After the Miyazaki Prefectural Railway was nationalized on 21 September 1917, Japanese Government Railways (JGR) undertook the subsequent extension of the track which it designated as the Miyazaki Main Line. Expanding north in phases, the track reached Nobeoka which was established as the northern terminus on 1 May 1922. It became a through-station on 29 October 1922 when the track was extended to Hyūga-Nagai. By 1923, the track had approached the southern terminus of the then Hoshū Line which JGR had been extending southwards from Kokura down the east coast of Kyushu to reach Shigeoka by March 1922. The link up between the two lines was achieved on 15 December 1923, and through traffic was thus established from Kokura through Nobeoka to Miyakonojō. The entire stretch of track was then renamed the Nippō Main Line. With the privatization of Japanese National Railways (JNR), the successor of JGR, on 1 April 1987, the station came under the control of JR Kyushu.

A new station building, accompanied by a mixed-use commercial development, opened in August 2017.

== Passenger statistics ==
In fiscal 2016, the station was used by an average of 1,195 passengers (boarding only) per day.

== JR Freight operations ==
The JR Freight depot is located on the east side of JR Kyushu's passenger station, and has one container platform and one cargo handling line connected to the station's arrival/departure line via a pull line that extends towards Minaminobeoka Station. There used to be dedicated lines (rayon lines and gunpowder lines) to the Asahi Kasei factory on the north side of the station, and containers were handled on these lines as well. The shunting work and container loading and unloading work is carried out by JR Freight Kyushu Logistics, a JR Freight group company. The depot handles JR standard 12-foot containers and 20-foot ocean containers.

== Surrounding area ==
- Nobeoka City Station Complex "Encross"
- Nobeoka Tourist Information Center
- Miyazaki Kotsu Nobeoka Station Bus Center
- Imayama Hachiman Shrine

== See also ==
- List of railway stations in Japan
