= Tateishi Station =

Railway station in Kitsuki, Ōita Prefecture, Japan

Tateishi Station 立石駅
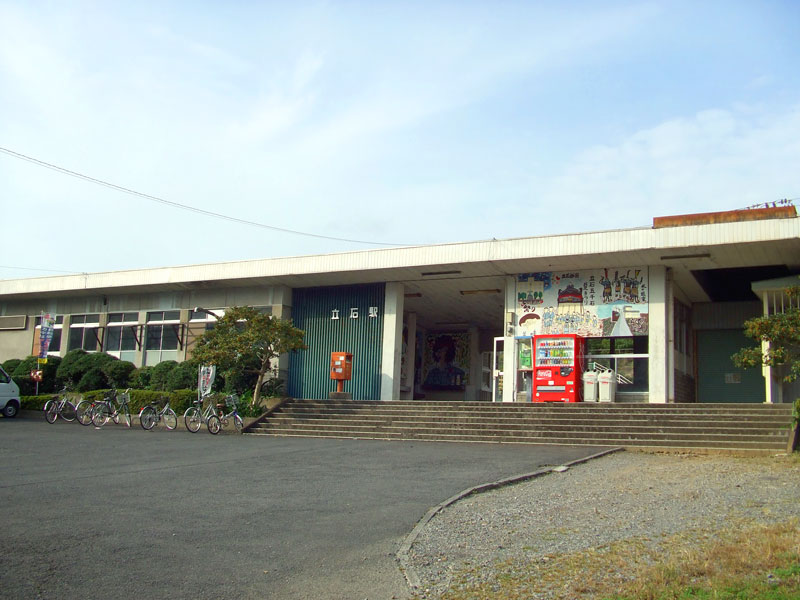
- Tateishi Station in 2007

General information
- Location: Yamagamachi Oaza Tateishi, Kitsuki-shi, Ōita-ken 879-1302; Japan
- Coordinates: 33°28′54″N 131°28′40″E
- Operator: JR Kyushu
- Line: ■ Nippō Main Line
- Distance: 85.2 km from Kokura
- Platforms: 2 side platforms
- Tracks: 2

Construction
- Structure type: At grade
- Accessible: No - platforms linked by footbridge

Other information
- Status: Unstaffed
- Website: Official website

History
- Opened: 15 December 1910

Passengers
- FY2015: 35 daily

Services
Preceding station	JR Kyushu	Following station
Naka-Yamaga towards Kagoshima	Nippō Main Line	Nishiyashiki towards Kokura
Location
- Location within Oita Prefecture Location within Japan

Tateishi Station (立石駅, Tateishi-eki) is a passenger railway station located in the city of Kitsuki, Ōita Prefecture, Japan. It is operated by JR Kyushu.

== Lines ==
The station is served by the Nippō Main Line and is located 85.2 km from the starting point of the line at Kokura.

== Layout ==
The station, which is unstaffed, consists of two side platforms serving two tracks. Approaching from the direction of Nishiyashiki, the double tracks of the Nippō Main Line are widely separated and converge to meet at the station, with the two platforms thus forming a V-shape. The station building is a modern concrete structure and serves only to house a waiting area and an automatic ticket vending machine. Access to the opposite side platform is by means of a footbridge located near the vertex of the "V".

=== Platforms ===
1	■ ■ Nippō Main Line	for Nakatsu and Kokura
2	■ ■ Nippō Main Line	for Beppu and Ōita

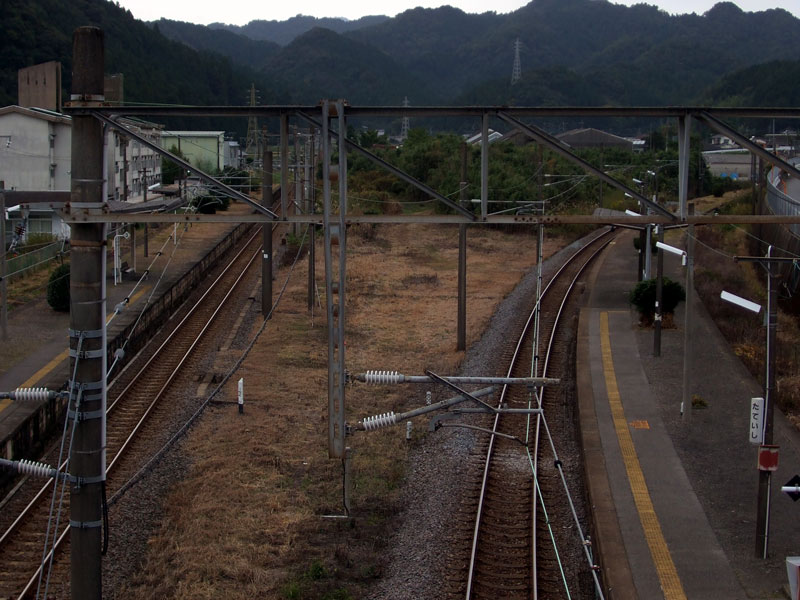
A view of the station platforms and tracks. Note how the platforms form a V-shape because of the converging tracks.

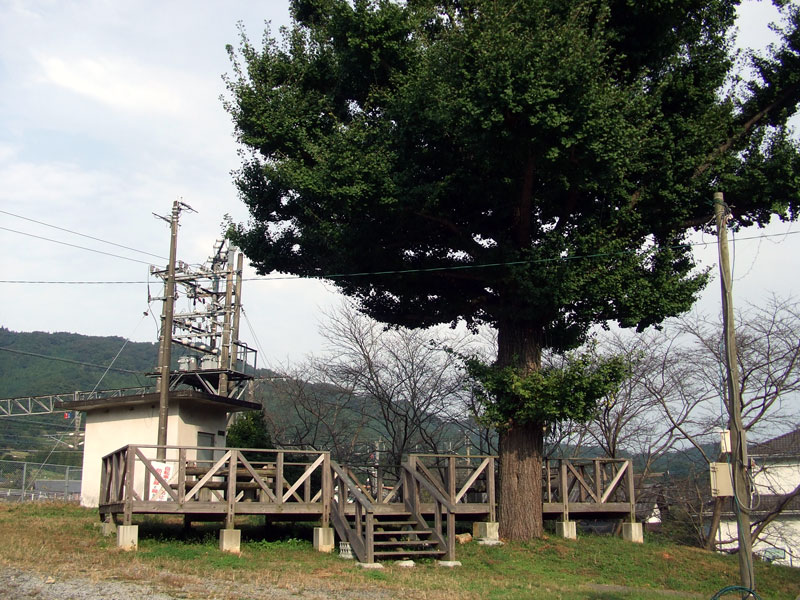
A recreational area under a big tree near the station, set up by the local residents.

== History ==
The private Kyushu Railway had, by 1909, through acquisition and its own expansion, established a track from Kokura to Yanagigaura. The Kyushu Railway was nationalised on 1 July 1907. Japanese Government Railways (JGR), designated the track as the Hōshū Main Line on 12 October 1909 and expanded it southwards in phases, with Naka-Yamaga opening as the new southern terminus on 15 December 1910. On the same day, Tateishi was opened as an intermediate station on the new track. On 15 December 1923, the Hōshū Main Line was renamed the Nippō Main Line. With the privatization of Japanese National Railways (JNR), the successor of JGR, on 1 April 1987, the station came under the control of JR Kyushu.

== Passenger statistics ==
In fiscal 2015, there were a total of 12,724 boarding passengers, giving a daily average of 35 passengers.

== Surrounding area ==
- Japan National Route 10
- Kitsuki City Hall Tateishi Branch
- Kitsuki City Tateishi Elementary School

== See also ==
- List of railway stations in Japan
