= Kitsuki Station =

Railway station in Kitsuki, Ōita Prefecture, Japan

Kitsuki Station 杵築駅
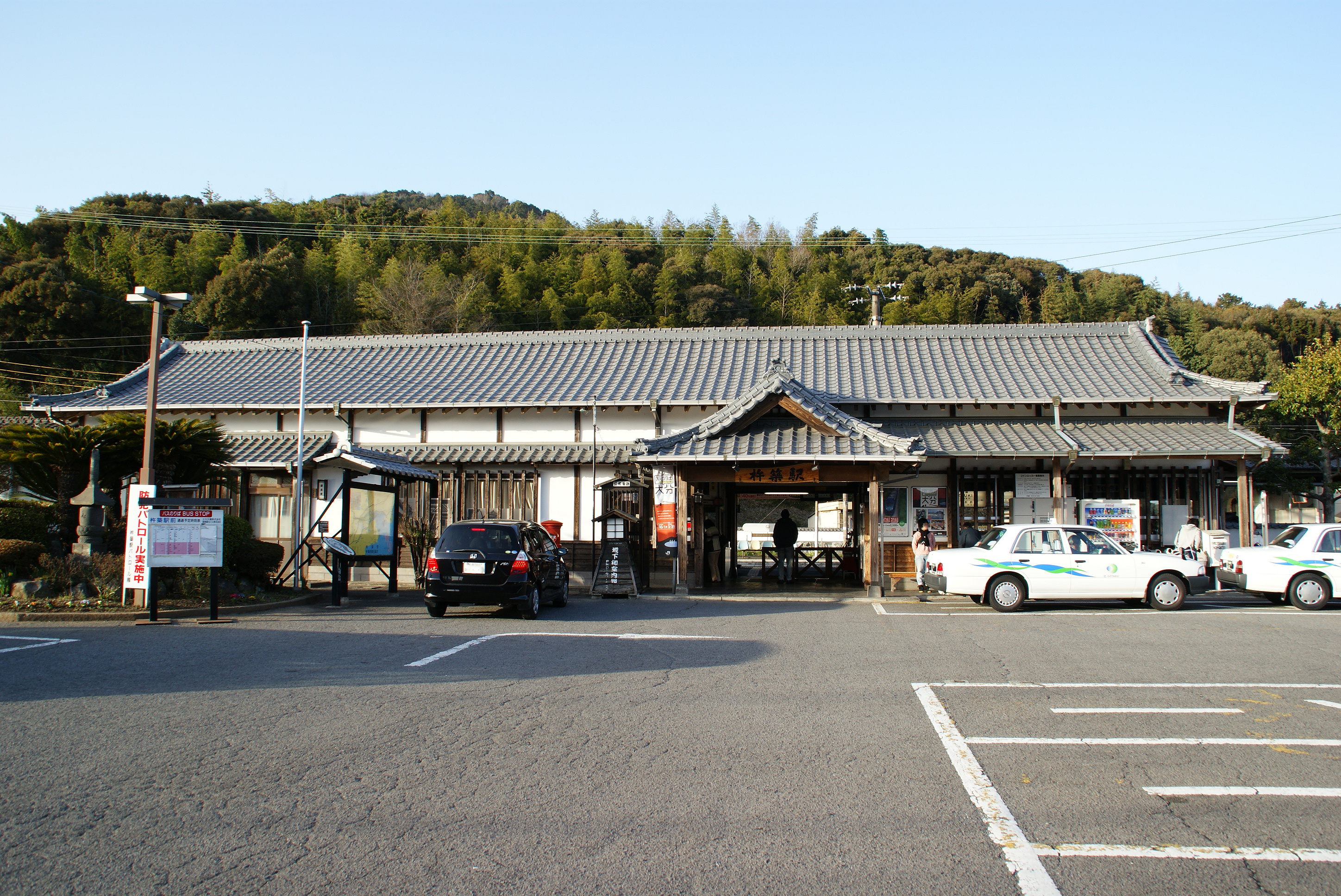
- Kitsuki Station in February 2009

General information
- Location: Yasaka, Kitsuki-shi, Oita-ken 873-0015; Japan
- Coordinates: 33°24′40″N 131°34′32″E
- Operator: JR Kyushu
- Line: ■ Nippō Main Line
- Distance: 99.2 km from Kokura
- Platforms: 1 side + 1 island platforms
- Tracks: 3 + 2 sidings

Construction
- Structure type: At grade
- Accessible: No - platforms linked by footbridge

Other information
- Status: Staffed ticket window (Midori no Madoguchi) (outsourced)
- Website: Official website

History
- Opened: 22 March 1911

Passengers
- FY2016: 758 daily
- Rank: 195th (among JR Kyushu stations)

Services
Preceding station	JR Kyushu	Following station
Ōga towards Kagoshima	Nippō Main Line	Naka-Yamaga towards Kokura
Location
- Location within Oita Prefecture Location within Japan

Kitsuki Station (杵築駅, Kitsuki-eki) is a passenger railway station located in the city of Kitsuki, Ōita Prefecture, Japan. It is operated by JR Kyushu.

== Lines ==
The station is served by the Nippō Main Line and is located 99.2 km from the starting point of the line at Kokura.

== Layout ==
The station consists of a side platform and an island platform serving three tracks. The station building is a timber structure of traditional Japanese design, built to resemble a Japanese castle. It houses a staffed ticket window, a waiting area and a tourist information centre. Access to the island platform is by means of a footbridge.

Management of the station has been outsourced to the JR Kyushu Tetsudou Eigyou Co., a wholly owned subsidiary of JR Kyushu specialising in station services. It staffs the ticket booth which is equipped with a Midori no Madoguchi facility.

=== Platforms ===
1	■ ■ Nippō Main Line	for Nakatsu and Kokura
2, 3	■ ■ Nippō Main Line	for Beppu and Ōita

== History ==
The private Kyushu Railway had, by 1909, through acquisition and its own expansion, established a track from Kokura to Yanagigaura. The Kyushu Railway was nationalised on 1 July 1907. Japanese Government Railways (JGR), designated the track as the Hōshū Main Line on 12 October 1909 and expanded it southwards in phases, with Hiji opening as the new southern terminus on 22 March 1911. On the same day, Kitsuki was opened as an intermediate station on the new track. On 15 December 1923, the Hōshū Main Line was renamed the Nippō Main Line. With the privatization of Japanese National Railways (JNR), the successor of JGR, on 1 April 1987, the station came under the control of JR Kyushu.

In 2015, the local town tourism association opened a tourist information centre at the station, replacing a kiosk which had closed the previous year.

== Passenger statistics ==
In fiscal 2016, the station was used by an average of 758 passengers daily (boarding passengers only), and it ranked 195th among the busiest stations of JR Kyushu.

== Surrounding area ==
- Oita Airport Road
- Oita Prefectural Kitsuki High School
- Kitsuki City Yasaka Elementary School

== See also ==
- List of railway stations in Japan
