= Usa Station =

Railway station in Usa, Ōita Prefecture, Japan

Usa Station 宇佐駅
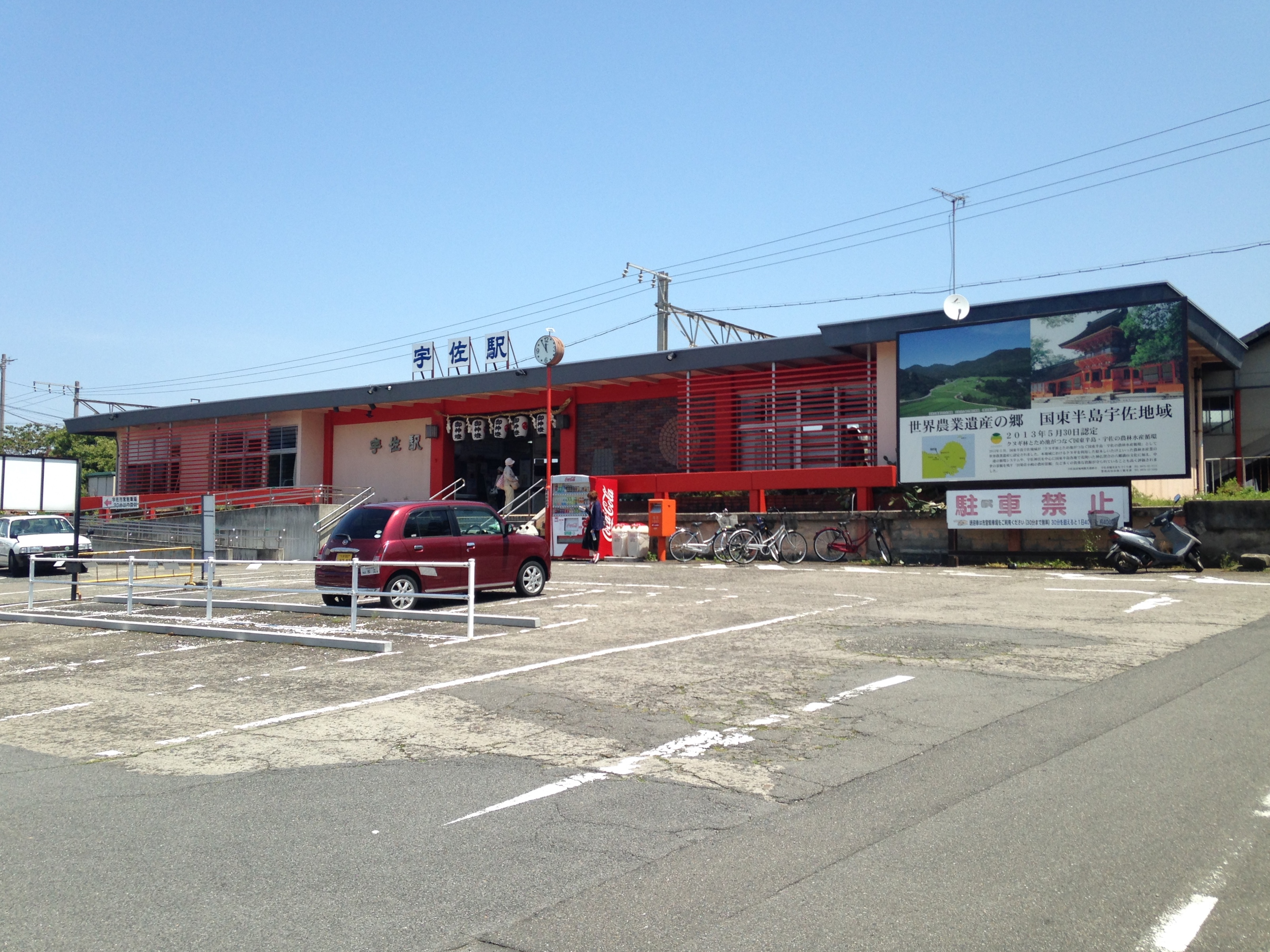
- Usa Station in April 2016

General information
- Location: Iwasaki 1218-6 Usa-shi, Ōita-ken 879-1132; Japan
- Coordinates: 33°31′56″N 131°24′43″E
- Operator: JR Kyushu
- Line: ■ Nippō Main Line
- Distance: 75.8 km from Kokura
- Platforms: 1 side + 1 island platform
- Tracks: 3 + 1 siding

Construction
- Structure type: At grade
- Parking: Available at forecourt
- Accessible: No - island platform accessed by footbridge

Other information
- Status: Staffed (Midori no Madoguchi)
- Website: Official website

History
- Opened: 21 December 1909

Passengers
- FY2016: 423 daily
- Rank: 263rd (among JR Kyushu stations)

Services
| Preceding station | JR Kyushu | Following station |
|---|---|---|
| Nishiyashiki towards Kagoshima | Nippō Main Line | Buzen-Nagasu towards Kokura |
Location
- Location within Oita Prefecture Location within Japan

Usa Station (宇佐駅, Usa-eki) is a passenger railway station located in the city of Usa, Ōita Prefecture, Japan. It is operated by JR Kyushu.

== Lines ==
The station is served by the Nippō Main Line and is located 75.8 km from the starting point of the line at Kokura.

== Layout ==
The station consists of a side platform and an island platform serving three tracks. The station building is a modern concrete block structure with a colour scheme chosen to match the Usa Jingū shrine. Facilities include a staffed ticket window, a waiting area and lockers. Access to the island platform is by means of a footbridge.

Management of the station has been outsourced to the JR Kyushu Tetsudou Eigyou Co., a wholly owned subsidiary of JR Kyushu specialising in station services. It staffs the ticket booth which is equipped with a Midori no Madoguchi facility.

=== Platforms ===
| 1 | ■ ■ Nippō Main Line | for Nakatsu and Kokura |
| 2 | ■ ■ Nippō Main Line | for Nakatsu and Kokura or Beppu and Ōita |
| 3 | ■ ■ Nippō Main Line | for Beppu and Ōita |

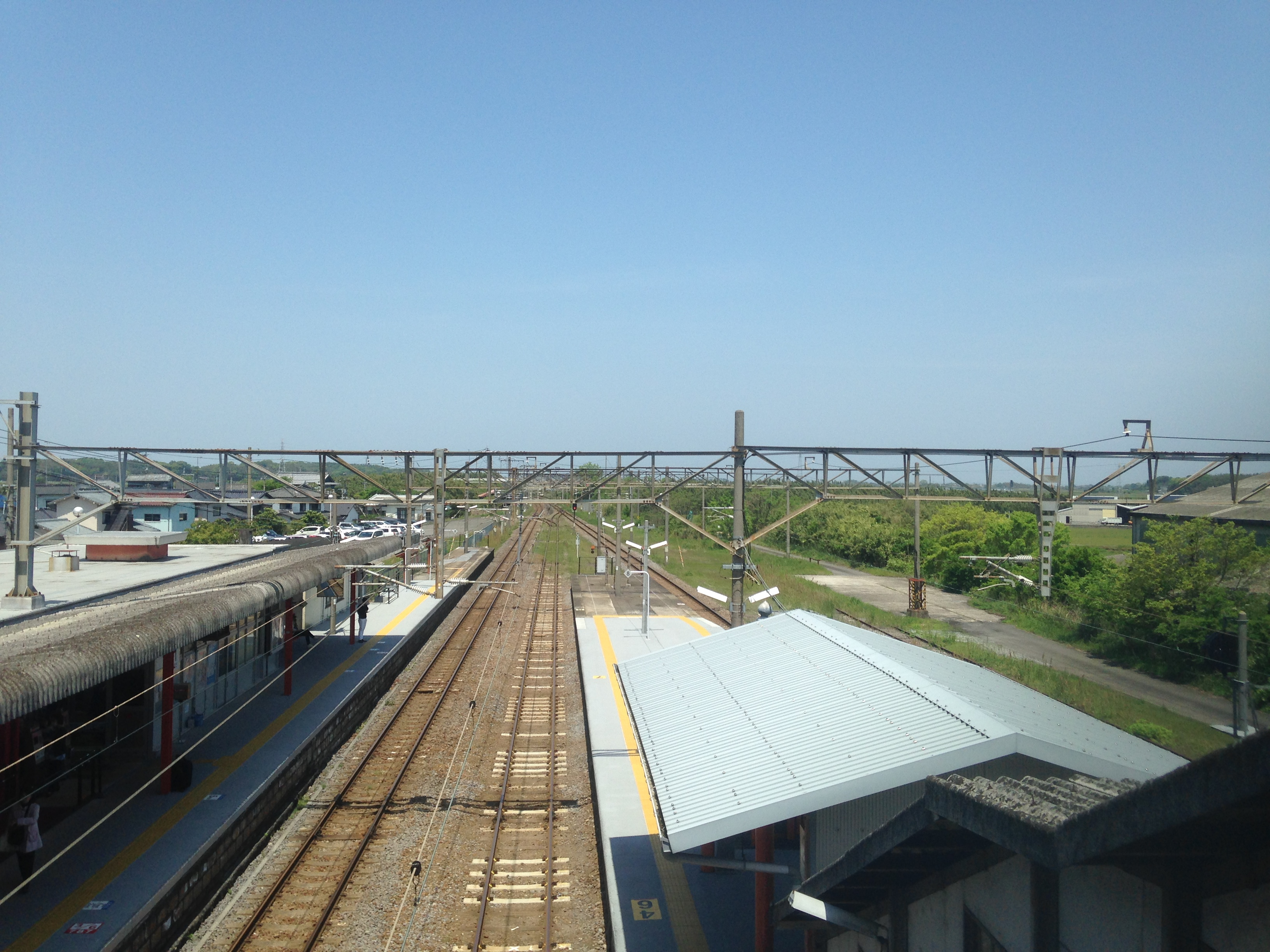
A view of the platforms and tracks. The siding can be seen at the extreme right beyond the island platform.

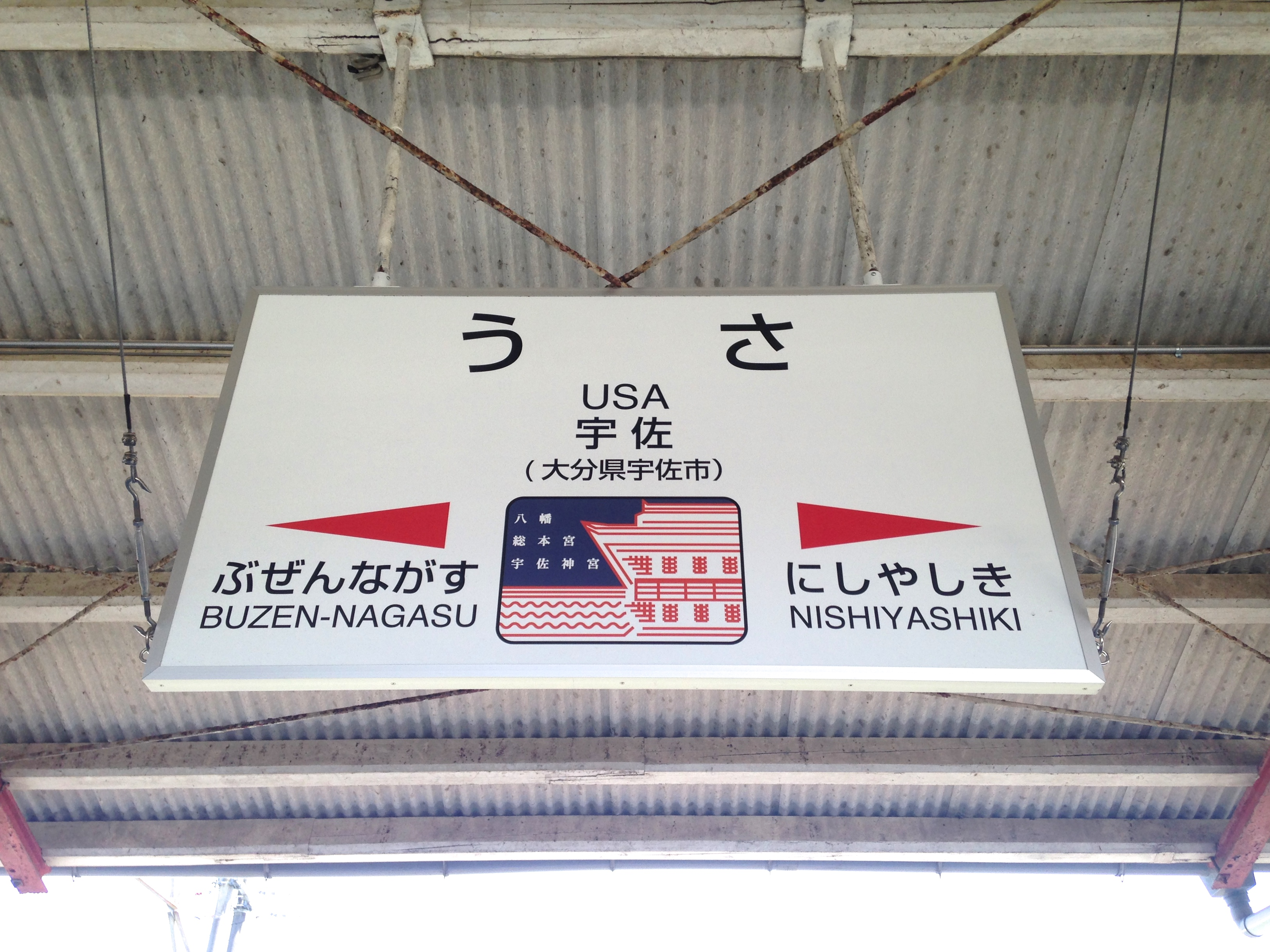
The station name board makes a visual pun about the station name and the United States. There is also a graphic of the Usa shrine.

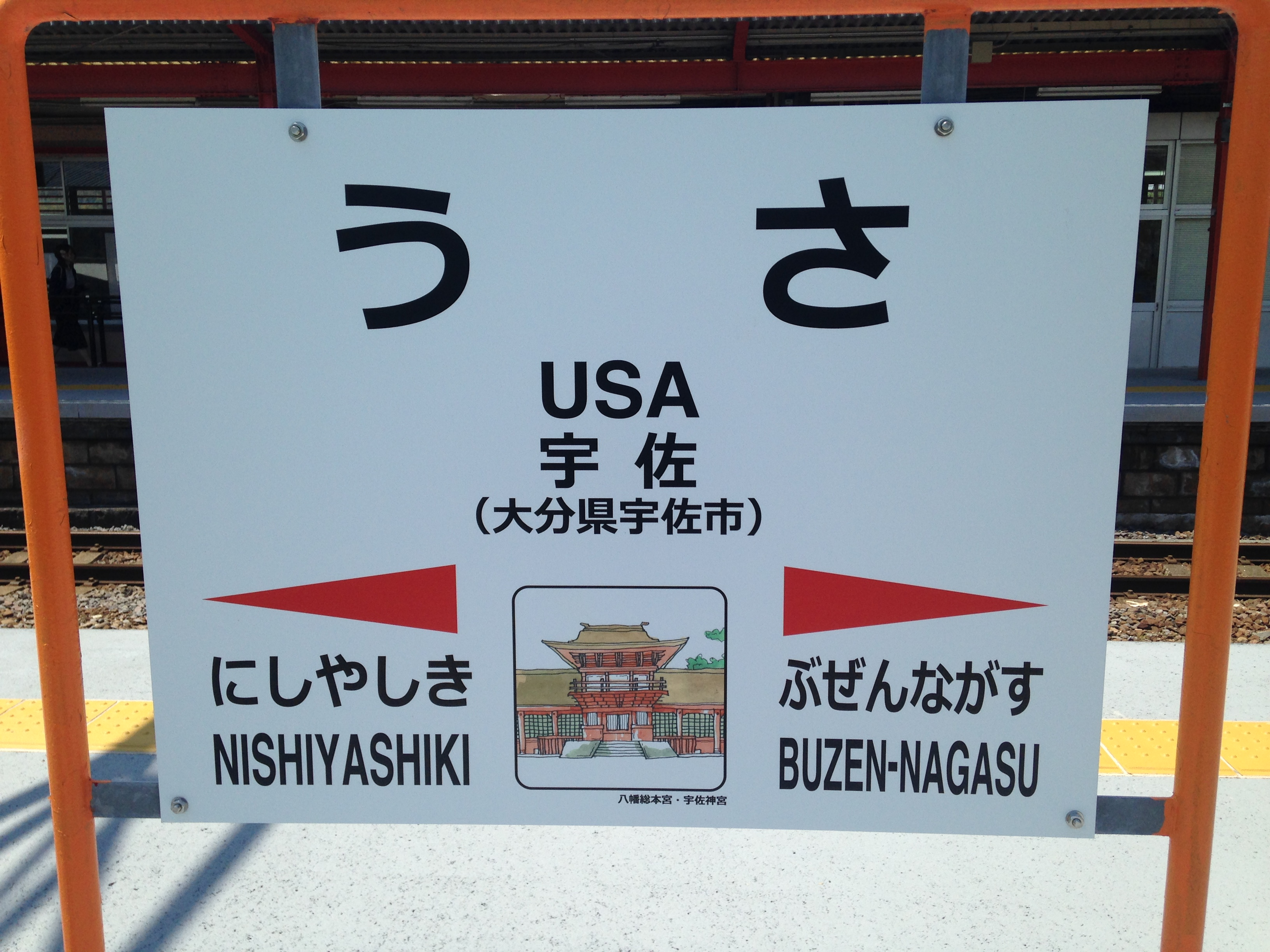
Another nameboard, with a detailed drawing of the Usa shrine.

== History ==
The private Kyushu Railway had, by 1909, through acquisition and its own expansion, established a track from Kokura to Yanagigaura. The Kyushu Railway was nationalised on 1 July 1907. Japanese Government Railways (JGR), designated the track as the Hōshū Main Line on 12 October 1909 and expanded it southwards, with Usa opening as the new southern terminus on 21 December 1909. It became a through-station on 15 December 1910 when the track was extended further to Naka-Yamaga. On 15 December 1923, the Hōshū Main Line was renamed the Nippō Main Line. With the privatization of Japanese National Railways (JNR), the successor of JGR, on 1 April 1987, the station came under the control of JR Kyushu.

== Passenger statistics ==
In fiscal 2016, the station was used by an average of 423 passengers daily (boarding passengers only), and it ranked 263rd among the busiest stations of JR Kyushu.

== Surrounding area ==
- Usa Jingū

== See also ==
- List of railway stations in Japan
