= Imazu Station =

Imazu Station is the name of two train stations in Japan:

- Imazu Station (Hyōgo)
- Imazu Station (Ōita)
