= Higashi-Nakatsu Station =

Railway station in Nakatsu, Ōita Prefecture, Japan

Higashi-Nakatsu Station 東中津駅
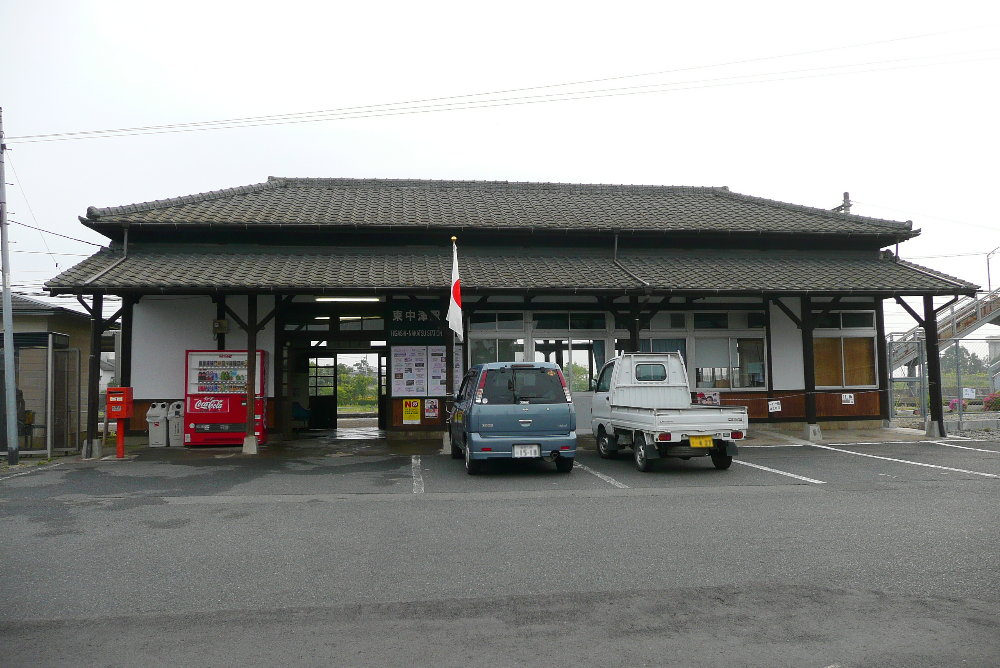
- Higashi-Nakatsu Station in 2007

General information
- Location: Korenori, Nakatsu-shi, Ōita-ken 871-0034; Japan
- Coordinates: 33°35′15″N 131°14′21″E
- Operator: JR Kyushu
- Line: ■ Nippō Main Line
- Distance: 56.7 km from Kokura
- Platforms: 2 side platforms
- Tracks: 2 + 2 sidings

Construction
- Structure type: At grade
- Parking: Available at forecourt
- Accessible: No - platforms linked by footbridge

Other information
- Status: Kan'i itaku station
- Website: Official website

History
- Opened: 25 May 1901
- Former names: Ōsada (to 1952)

Passengers
- FY2015: 306 daily

Services
Preceding station	JR Kyushu	Following station
Imazu towards Kagoshima	Nippō Main Line	Nakatsu towards Kokura
Location
- Location within Oita Prefecture Location within Japan

Higashi-Nakatsu Station (東中津駅, Higashi-Nakatsu-eki) is a passenger railway station located in the city of Nakatsu, Ōita Prefecture, Japan. It is operated by JR Kyushu.

== Lines ==
The station is served by the Nippō Main Line and is located 56.7 km from the starting point of the line at Kokura.

== Layout ==
The station consists of two side platforms serving two tracks. Both tracks run on the north side of their respective platforms, suggesting that platform 2 was once an island platform but the middle line has been removed. A siding branches off each track. The station building is a wooden structure of traditional Japanese design and houses a staffed ticket window, a waiting area, an automatic ticket vending machine, a SUGOCA charge station and a SUGOCA card reader. Access to the opposite side platform is by means of a footbridge.

JR Kyushu ceased to staff the station in March 2015. Thereafter, Nakatsu City authorities managed the ticket window on a kan'i itaku basis.

=== Platforms ===
1	■ ■ Nippō Main Line	for Nakatsu and Kokura
2	■ ■ Nippō Main Line	for Beppu and Ōita

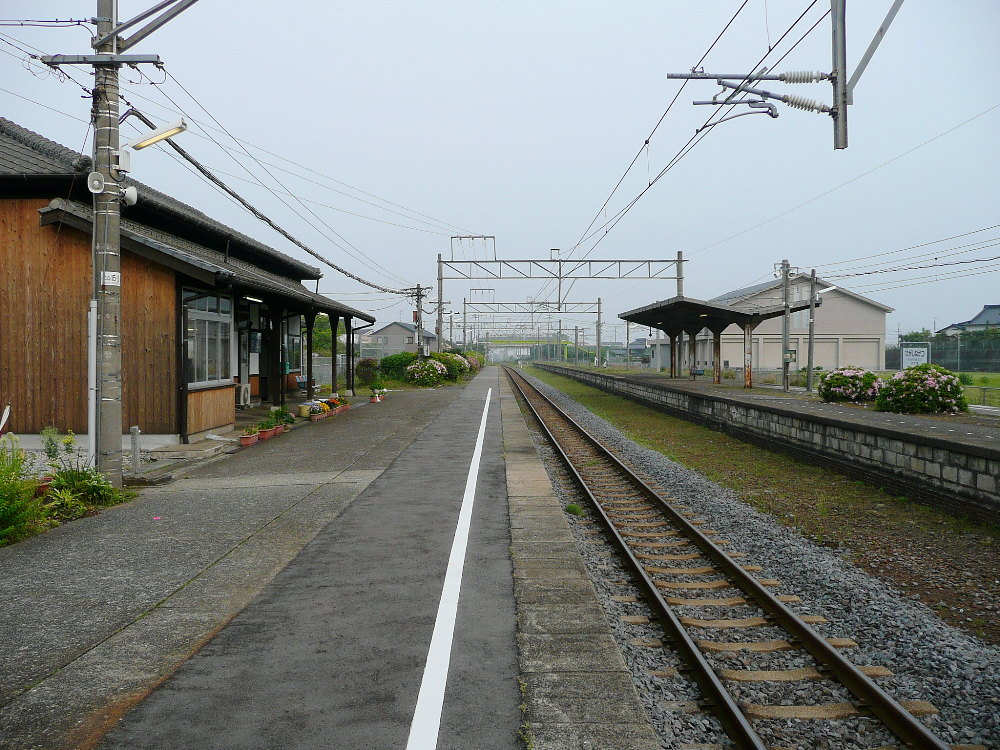
A view of the platforms and tracks. Note what appears to be the trackbed of a former track next to the platform to the left.

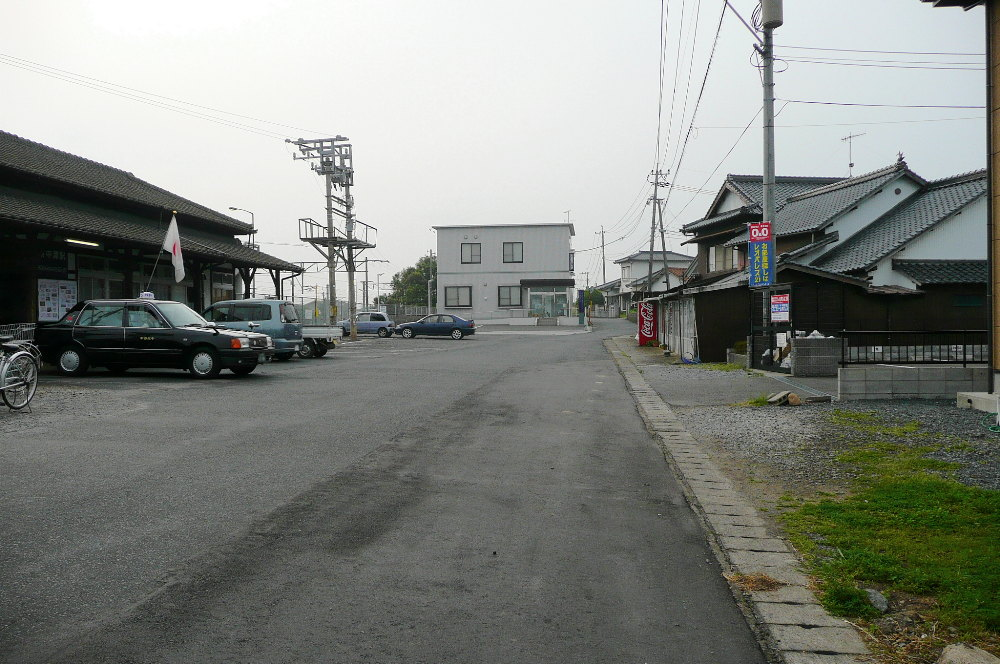
A view of the station forecourt.

== History ==
The private Hōshū Railway opened Ōsada Station (大貞駅) on 25 May 1901 as an additional station on its track from Yukuhashi to Yanagigaura which it had opened in 1897. The Hōshū Railway was acquired by the Kyushu Railway on 3 September 1901 and the Kyushu Railway was itself nationalised on 1 July 1907, whereupon Japanese Government Railways (JGR) assumed control of the station. It was designated it as part of the Hōshū Main Line on 12 October 1909 and then as part of the Nippō Main Line on 15 December 1923. The station was renamed to its present name on 15 November 1952. With the privatization of Japanese National Railways (JNR), the successor of JGR, on 1 April 1987, the station came under the control of JR Kyushu.

== Passenger statistics ==
In fiscal 2015, there were a total of 111,687 boarding passengers, giving a daily average of 306 passengers.

== Surrounding area ==
- Nakatsu City Higashi-Nakatsu Junior High School
- Japan National Route 10

== See also ==
- List of railway stations in Japan
