= Naka-Yamaga Station =

Railway station in Kitsuki, Ōita Prefecture, Japan

Naka-Yamaga Station 中山香駅
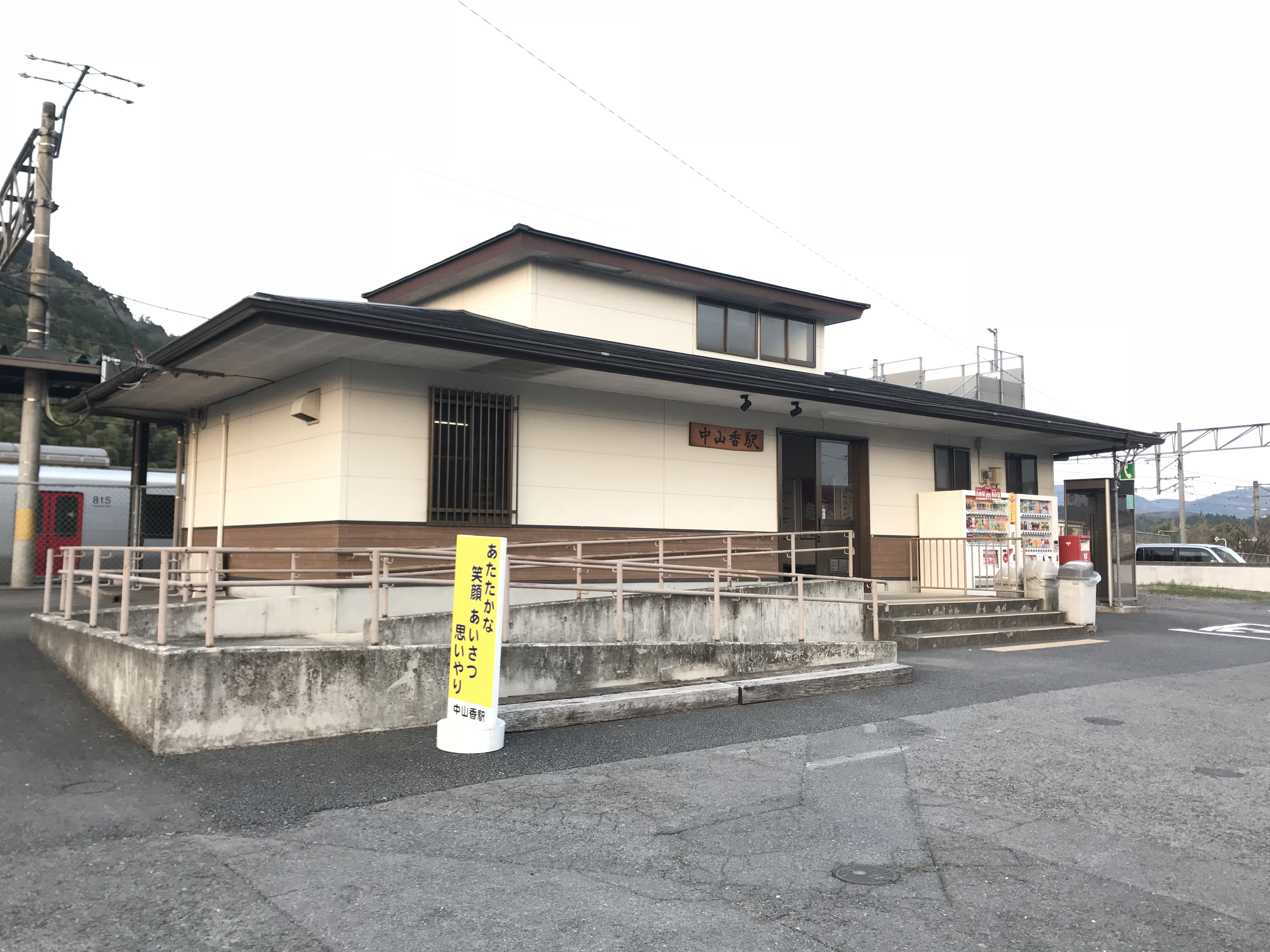
- Naka Yamaga Station in March 2018

General information
- Location: Yamagamachi Noharu, Kitsuki-shi, Ōita-ken 879-1307; Japan
- Coordinates: 33°26′55″N 131°30′20″E
- Operator: JR Kyushu
- Line: ■ Nippō Main Line
- Distance: 90.4 km from Kokura
- Platforms: 1 side + 1 island platform
- Tracks: 3

Construction
- Structure type: At grade
- Parking: Available at forecourt
- Accessible: No - island platform accessed by footbridge

Other information
- Status: Kan'i itaku station
- Website: Official website

History
- Opened: 15 December 1910

Passengers
- FY2015: 231 daily

Services
Preceding station	JR Kyushu	Following station
Kitsuki towards Kagoshima	Nippō Main Line	Tateishi towards Kokura
Location
- Location within Oita Prefecture Location within Japan

Naka-Yamaga Station (中山香駅, Naka-Yamaga-eki) is a passenger railway station located in the city of Kitsuki, Ōita Prefecture, Japan. It is operated by JR Kyushu.

== Lines ==
The station is served by the Nippō Main Line and is located 90.4 km from the starting point of the line at Kokura.

== Layout ==
The station consists of a side platform and an island platform serving three tracks. The station building is a modern concrete block structure. It houses a staffed ticket window, a waiting area and an automatic ticket vending machine. There is an accessibility ramp to the station building from the forecourt but a footbridge is needed to access the island platform.

The station is not staffed by JR Kyushu but a kan'i itaku agent is on site and manages the ticket window, which is equipped with a POS machine.

=== Platforms ===
1	■ ■ Nippō Main Line	for Nakatsu and Kokura
2, 3	■ ■ Nippō Main Line	for Beppu and Ōita

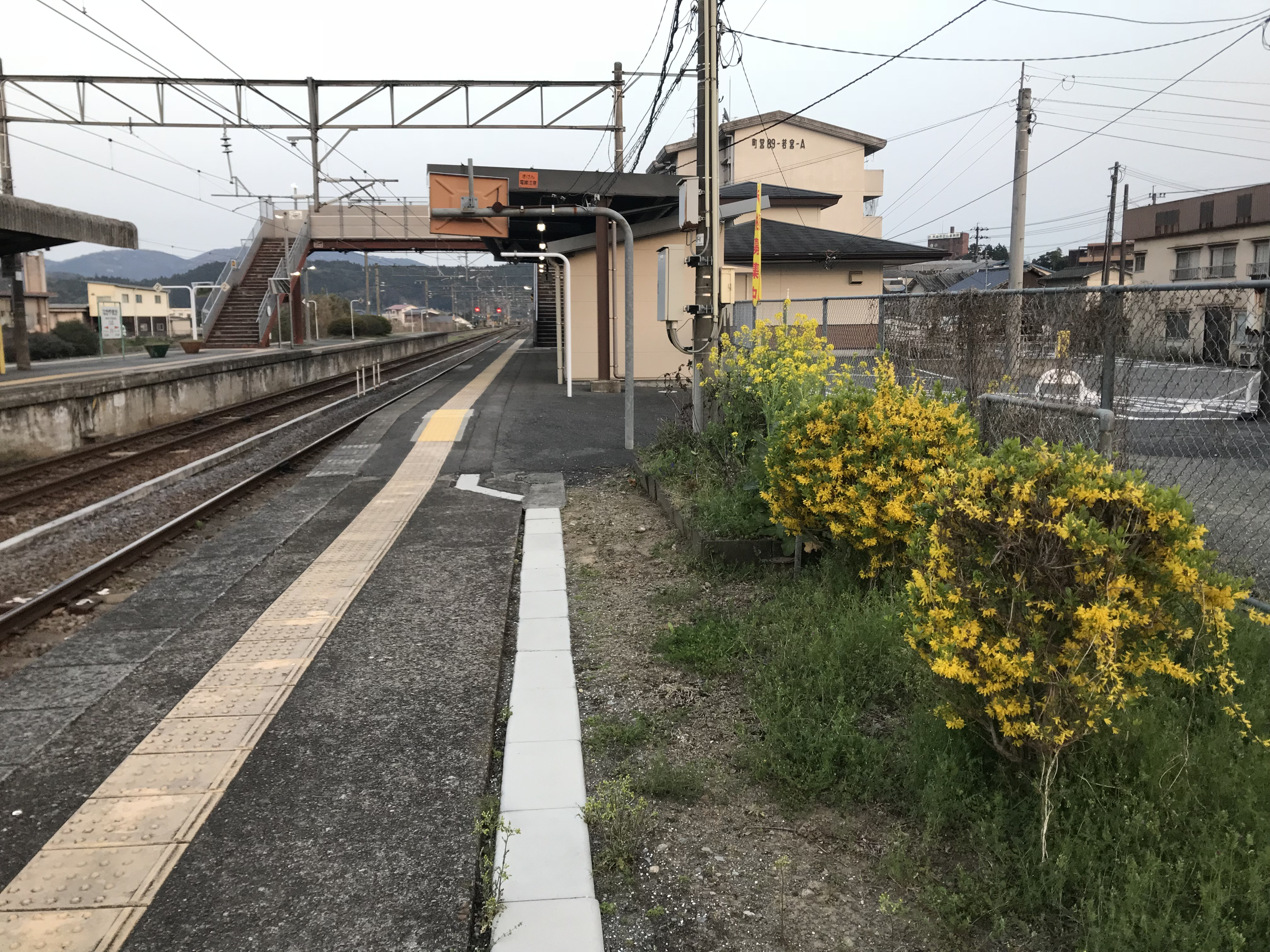
A view of the platforms and tracks.

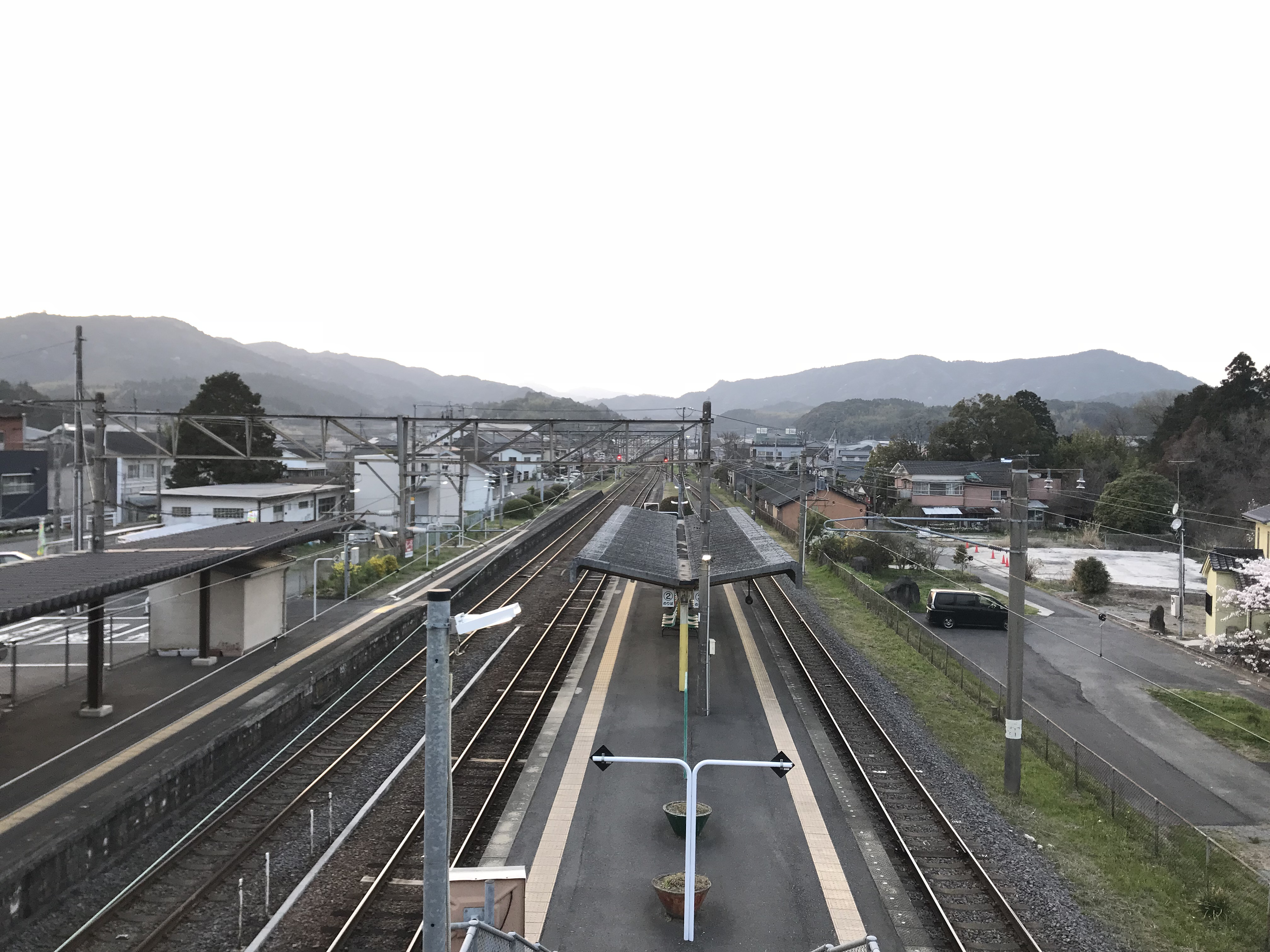
A high-angle view from the footbridge, looking west.

== History ==
The private Kyushu Railway had, by 1909, through acquisition and its own expansion, established a track from Kokura to Yanagigaura. The Kyushu Railway was nationalised on 1 July 1907. Japanese Government Railways (JGR), designated the track as the Hōshū Main Line on 12 October 1909 and expanded it southwards in phases, with Naka-Yamaga opening as the new southern terminus on 15 December 1910. It became a through-station on 22 March 1911 when the track was extended further south to Hiji. On 15 December 1923, the Hōshū Main Line was renamed the Nippō Main Line. With the privatization of Japanese National Railways (JNR), the successor of JGR, on 1 April 1987, the station came under the control of JR Kyushu.

== Surrounding area ==
- Kitsuki City Hall Yamaka Office Building (former Yamaka Town Hall)
- Kitsuki City Yamaka Elementary School
- Kitsuki City Yamaka Junior High School
- Oita Prefectural Yamaka Agricultural High School

== Passenger statistics ==
In fiscal 2015, there were a total of 84,331 boarding passengers, giving a daily average of 231 passengers.

== See also ==
- List of railway stations in Japan
