= Buzen-Zenkōji Station =

Railway station in Usa, Ōita Prefecture, Japan

Buzen-Zenkoji Station 豊前善光寺駅
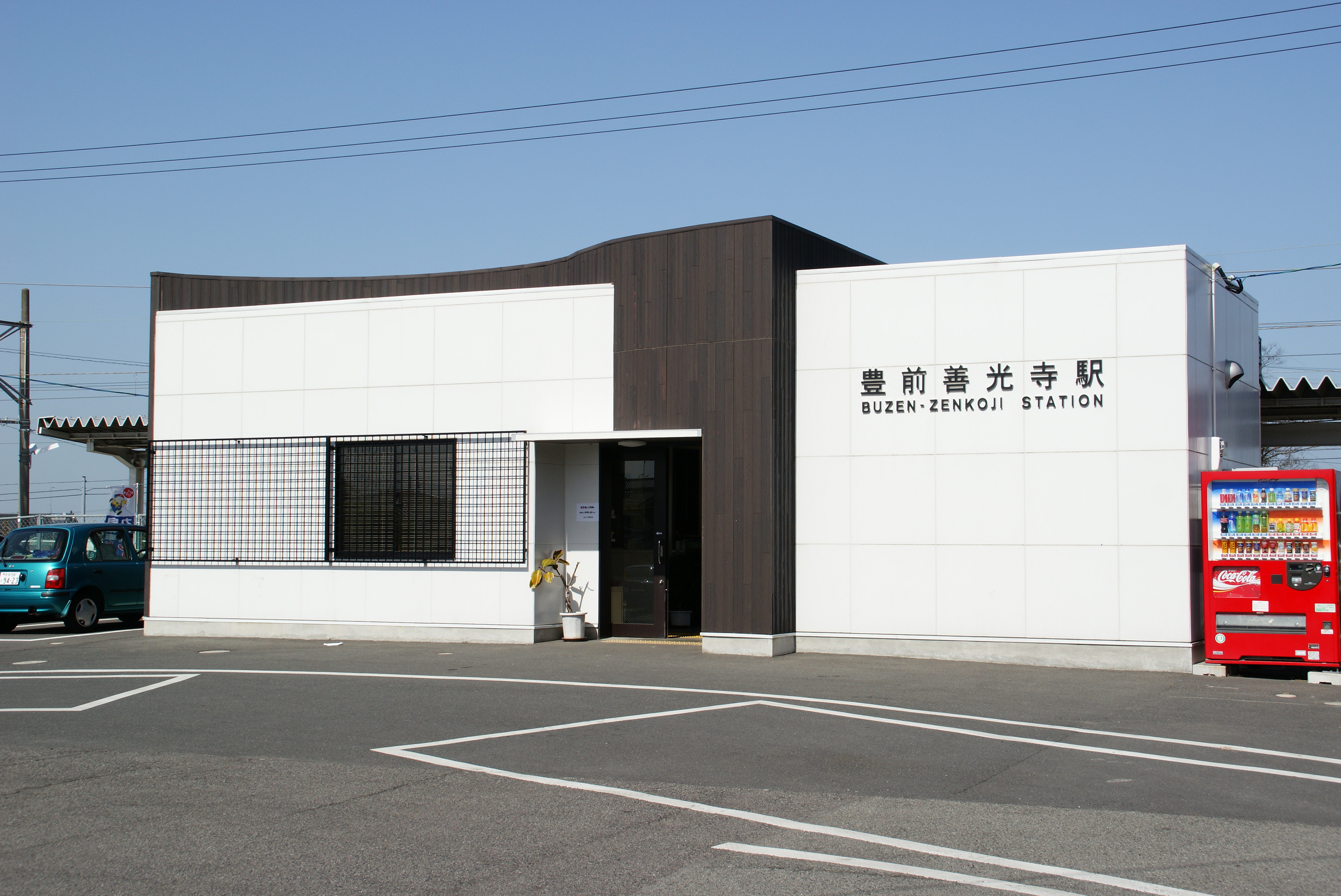
- Buzen-Zenkoji Station in 2009

General information
- Location: Higashitakei, Usa-shi, Ōita-ken 879-0309; Japan
- Coordinates: 33°33′59″N 131°19′23″E
- Operator: JR Kyushu
- Line: ■ Nippō Main Line
- Distance: 65.5 km from Kokura
- Platforms: 2 side platforms
- Tracks: 2

Construction
- Structure type: At grade
- Accessible: No - platforms linked by footbridge

Other information
- Status: Unstaffed
- Website: Official website

History
- Opened: 25 September 1897
- Former names: Yokkaichi (until 24 April 1919); Takenogō (until 1 September 1919)

Passengers
- FY2015: 257 daily

Services
Preceding station	JR Kyushu	Following station
Yanagigaura towards Kagoshima	Nippō Main Line	Amatsu towards Kokura
Location
- Location within Oita Prefecture Location within Japan

Buzen-Zenkōji Station (豊前善光寺駅, Buzen-Zenkōji-eki) is a passenger railway station located in the city of Usa, Ōita Prefecture, Japan. It is operated by JR Kyushu.

== Lines ==
The station is served by the Nippō Main Line and is located 65.5 km from the starting point of the line at Kokura.

== Layout ==
The station, which is unstaffed, consists of two side platforms serving two tracks. There had once been a side and an island platform but the centre track has been removed, leaving two side platforms. The station building is a modern steel structure which serves only to house a waiting area and an automatic ticket vending machine. Access to the opposite side platform is by means of a footbridge.

=== Platforms ===
1	■ ■ Nippō Main Line	for Nakatsu and Kokura
2	■ ■ Nippō Main Line	for Ōita and Miyazaki

== History ==
The private Hōshū Railway opened the station on 25 September 1897 with the name Yokkaichi (四日市) as an intermediate station on the Hōshū Railway, a line which it had laid from Yukuhashi to Yanagigaura. The Hōshū Railway was acquired by the Kyushu Railway on 3 September 1901 and the Kyushu Railway was itself nationalised on 1 July 1907. Japanese Government Railways (JGR) designated the station as part of the Hōshū Main Line on 12 October 1909. The station was renamed first as Takenogō (高家郷) on 24 April 1919 and finally to Buzen-Zenkoji on 1 September the same year. On 15 December 1923, the station became part of the Nippō Main Line. With the privatization of Japanese National Railways (JNR), the successor of JGR, on 1 April 1987, the station came under the control of JR Kyushu.

The station became unstaffed in 2016.

== Passenger statistics ==
In fiscal 2015, there were a total of 93,756 boarding passengers, giving a daily average of 257 passengers.

== Surrounding area ==
- Buzen-Zenko-ji temple

== See also ==
- List of railway stations in Japan
