= Amatsu Station =

Railway station in Usa, Ōita Prefecture, Japan

Amatsu Station 天津駅
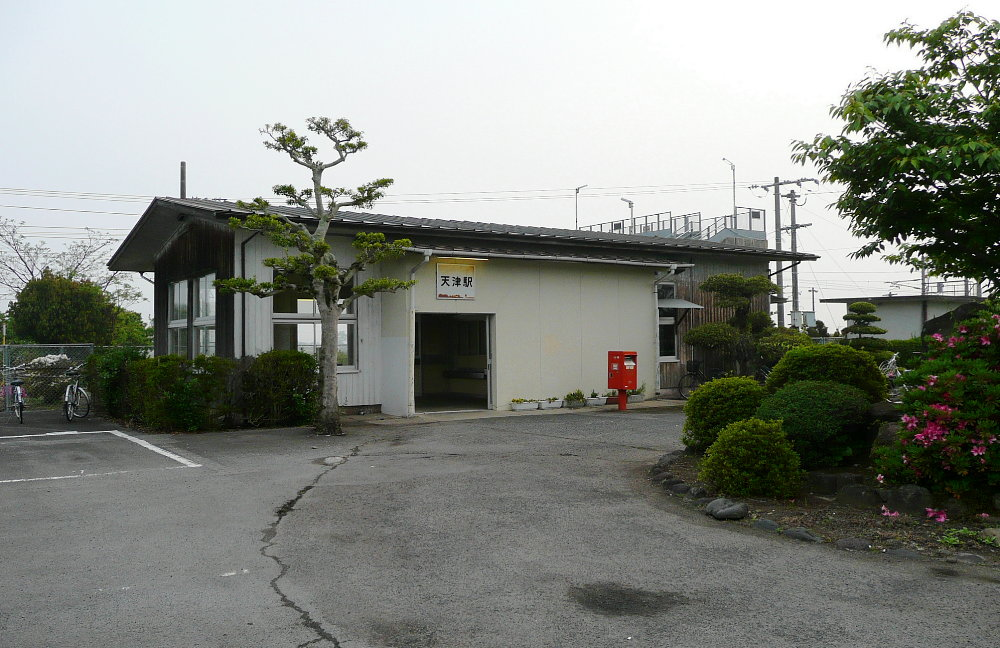
- Amatsu Station in May 2007

General information
- Location: Shimoshikida, Usa-shi, Ōita-ken 879-0161; Japan
- Coordinates: 33°33′52″N 131°17′30″E
- Operator: JR Kyushu
- Line: ■ Nippō Main Line
- Distance: 62.5 km from Kokura
- Platforms: 1 island platform
- Tracks: 2

Construction
- Structure type: At grade
- Parking: Available
- Accessible: No - platform accessed by footbridge

Other information
- Status: Unstaffed
- Website: Official website

History
- Opened: 1 October 1956

Passengers
- FY2015: 90 daily

Services
Preceding station	JR Kyushu	Following station
Buzen-Zenkōji towards Kagoshima	Nippō Main Line	Imazu towards Kokura
Location
- Location within Oita Prefecture Location within Japan

Amatsu Station (天津駅, Amatsu-eki) is a passenger railway station located in the city of Usa, Ōita Prefecture, Japan. It is operated by JR Kyushu.

== Lines ==
The station is served by the Nippō Main Line and is located 62.5 km from the starting point of the line at Kokura.

== Layout ==
The station, which is unstaffed, consists of an island platform serving two tracks. The station building is a wooden structure of simple, functional design which serves only to house a waiting area and an automatic ticket vending machine. Access to the island platform is by means of a footbridge.

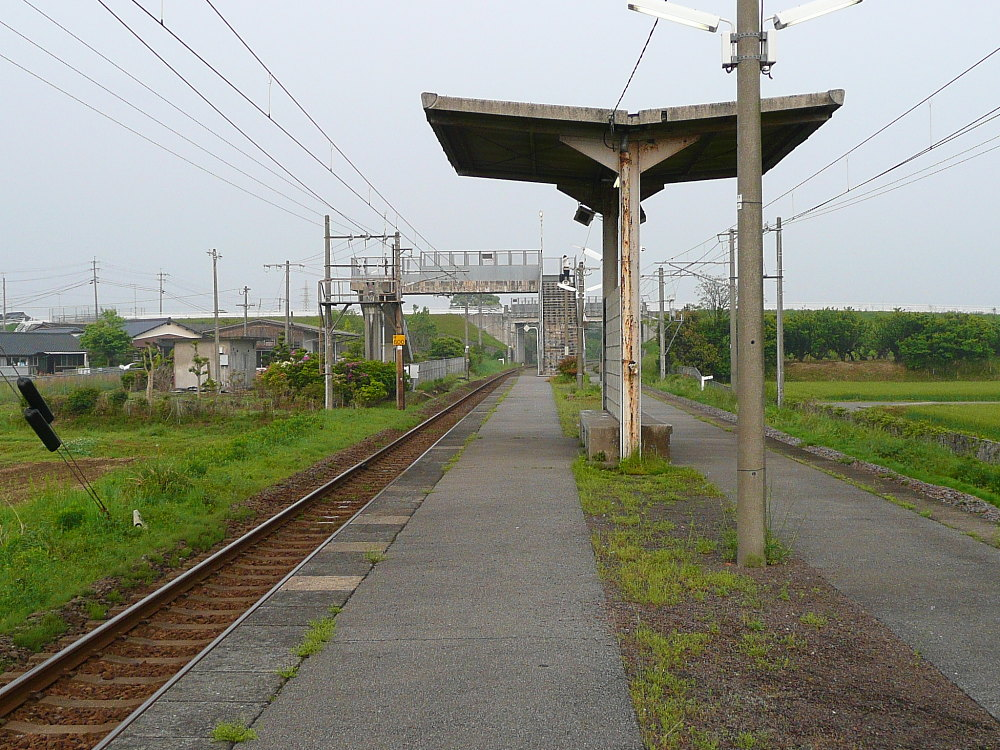
A view of the platform and tracks.

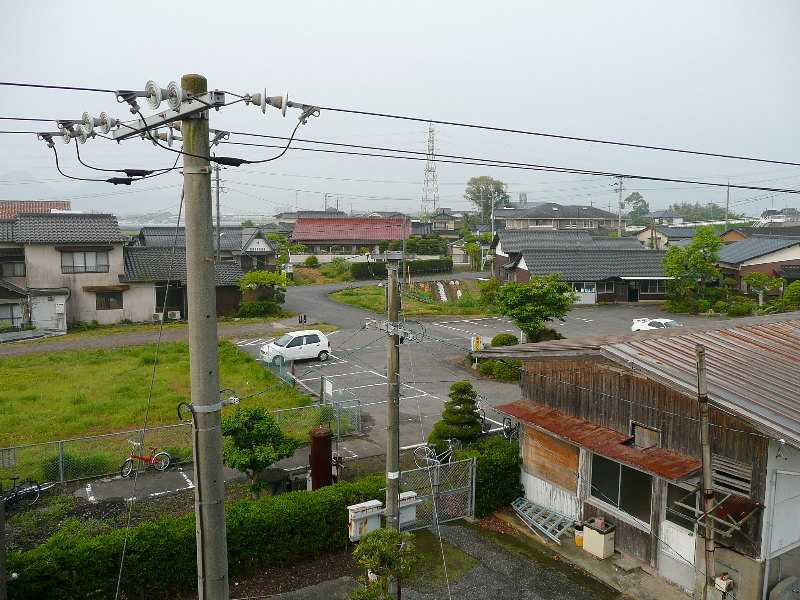
Station forecourt, as seen from the footbridge to the platform.

=== Platforms ===
1	■ ■ Nippō Main Line	for Nakatsu and Kokura
2	■ ■ Nippō Main Line	for Ōita and Miyazaki

== History ==
Japanese National Railways (JNR) opened the station on 1 October 1956 as an additional station on the existing track of the Nippō Main Line. With the privatization of JNR on 1 April 1987, the station came under the control of JR Kyushu.

== Passenger statistics ==
In fiscal 2015, there were a total of 32,796 boarding passengers, giving a daily average of 90 passengers.

== Surrounding area ==
- Usa City Amatsu Elementary School

== See also ==
- List of railway stations in Japan
