= Buzen-Nagasu Station =

Railway station in Usa, Ōita Prefecture, Japan

Buzen-Nagasu Station 豊前長洲駅
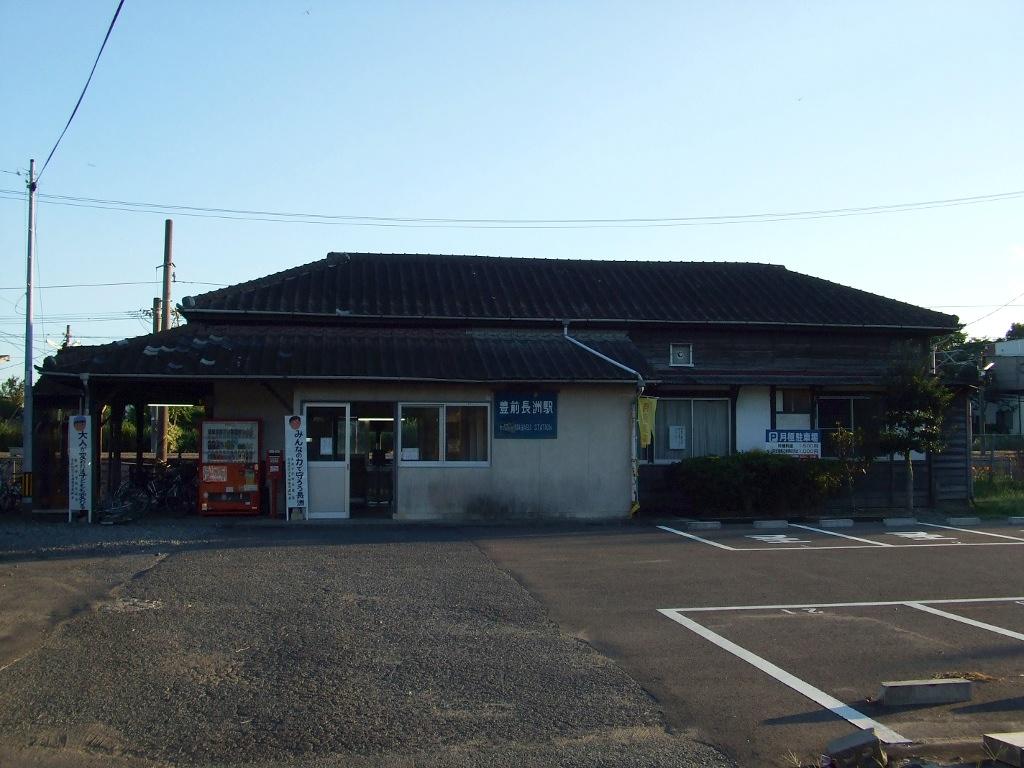
- Buzen-Nagasu Station in 2007

General information
- Location: 928 Oguro, Nagasu, Usa-shi, Ōita-ken 872-0001; Japan
- Coordinates: 33°33′54″N 131°22′58″E
- Operator: JR Kyushu
- Line: ■ Nippō Main Line
- Distance: 71.0 km from Kokura
- Platforms: 1 island platform
- Tracks: 2

Construction
- Structure type: At grade
- Accessible: No - platform accessed by footbridge

Other information
- Status: Unstaffed
- Website: Official website

History
- Opened: 22 April 1911

Passengers
- FY2015: 82 daily

Services
Preceding station	JR Kyushu	Following station
Usa towards Kagoshima	Nippō Main Line	Yanagigaura towards Kokura
Location
- Location within Oita Prefecture Location within Japan

Buzen-Nagasu Station (豊前長洲駅, Buzen-Nagasu-eki) is a passenger railway station located in the city of Usa, Ōita Prefecture, Japan. It is operated by JR Kyushu.

== Lines ==
The station is served by the Nippō Main Line and is located 71.0 km from the starting point of the line at Kokura.

== Layout ==
The station, which is unstaffed, consists of an island platform serving two tracks. The station building is an old wooden structure of Japanese design and serves only to house a waiting area and an automatic ticket vending machine. Access to the island platform is by means of a footbridge.

=== Platforms ===
1	■ ■ Nippō Main Line	for Beppu and Ōita
2	■ ■ Nippō Main Line	for Nakatsu and Kokura

== History ==
Japanese Government Railways (JGR) opened the station on 22 April 1911 as an additional station on its then Hōshū Main Line. On 15 December 1923, the Hōshū Main Line was renamed the Nippō Main Line. With the privatization of Japanese National Railways (JNR), the successor of JGR, on 1 April 1987, the station came under the control of JR Kyushu.

== Passenger statistics ==
In fiscal 2015, there were a total of 29,787 boarding passengers, giving a daily average of 82 passengers.

== Surrounding area ==
- Usa City Nagasu Junior High School
- Usa City Nagasu Elementary School
- Usa City Hall Nagasu Branch (former Nagasu Town Hall)

== See also ==
- List of railway stations in Japan
