= Nishiyashiki Station =

Railway station in Usa, Ōita Prefecture, Japan

Nishiyashiki Station 西屋敷駅
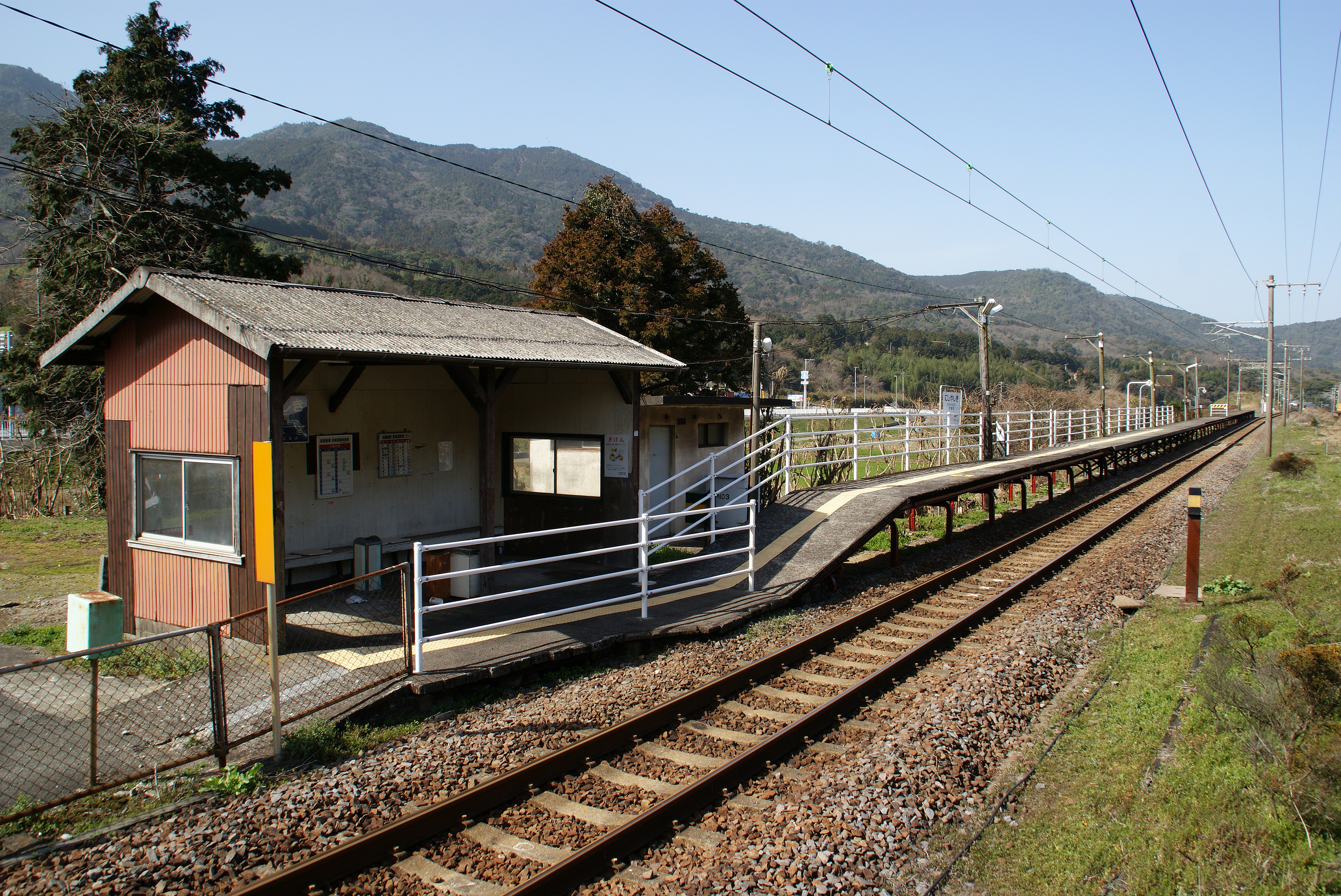
- Nishiyashiki Station in February 2009

General information
- Location: Nishiyashiki, Usa-shi, Ōita-ken 879-1127; Japan
- Coordinates: 33°30′14″N 131°25′48″E
- Operator: JR Kyushu
- Line: ■ Nippō Main Line
- Distance: 79.4 km from Kokura
- Platforms: 2 side platforms
- Tracks: 2

Construction
- Structure type: At grade

Other information
- Status: Unstaffed
- Website: Official website

History
- Opened: 1 September 1926

Passengers
- FY2015: 13 daily

Services
Preceding station	JR Kyushu	Following station
Tateishi towards Kagoshima	Nippō Main Line	Usa towards Kokura
Location
- Location within Oita Prefecture Location within Japan

Nishiyashiki Station (西屋敷駅, Nishiyashiki-eki) is a passenger railway station located in the city of Usa, Ōita Prefecture, Japan. It is operated by JR Kyushu.

== Lines ==
The station is served by the Nippō Main Line and is located 79.4 km from the starting point of the line at Kokura.

== Layout ==
The station, which is unstaffed, consists of two side platforms serving two tracks. Both tracks run on the east side of their respective platforms. There is no station building, only shelters on both platforms for waiting passengers. Each platform has its separate entrance and there is no link within the station premises. To cross from one platform to the next, it is necessary to use an underpass located some distance from the station entrance.

=== Platforms ===
1	■ ■ Nippō Main Line	for Nakatsu and Kokura
2	■ ■ Nippō Main Line	for Ōita and Miyazaki

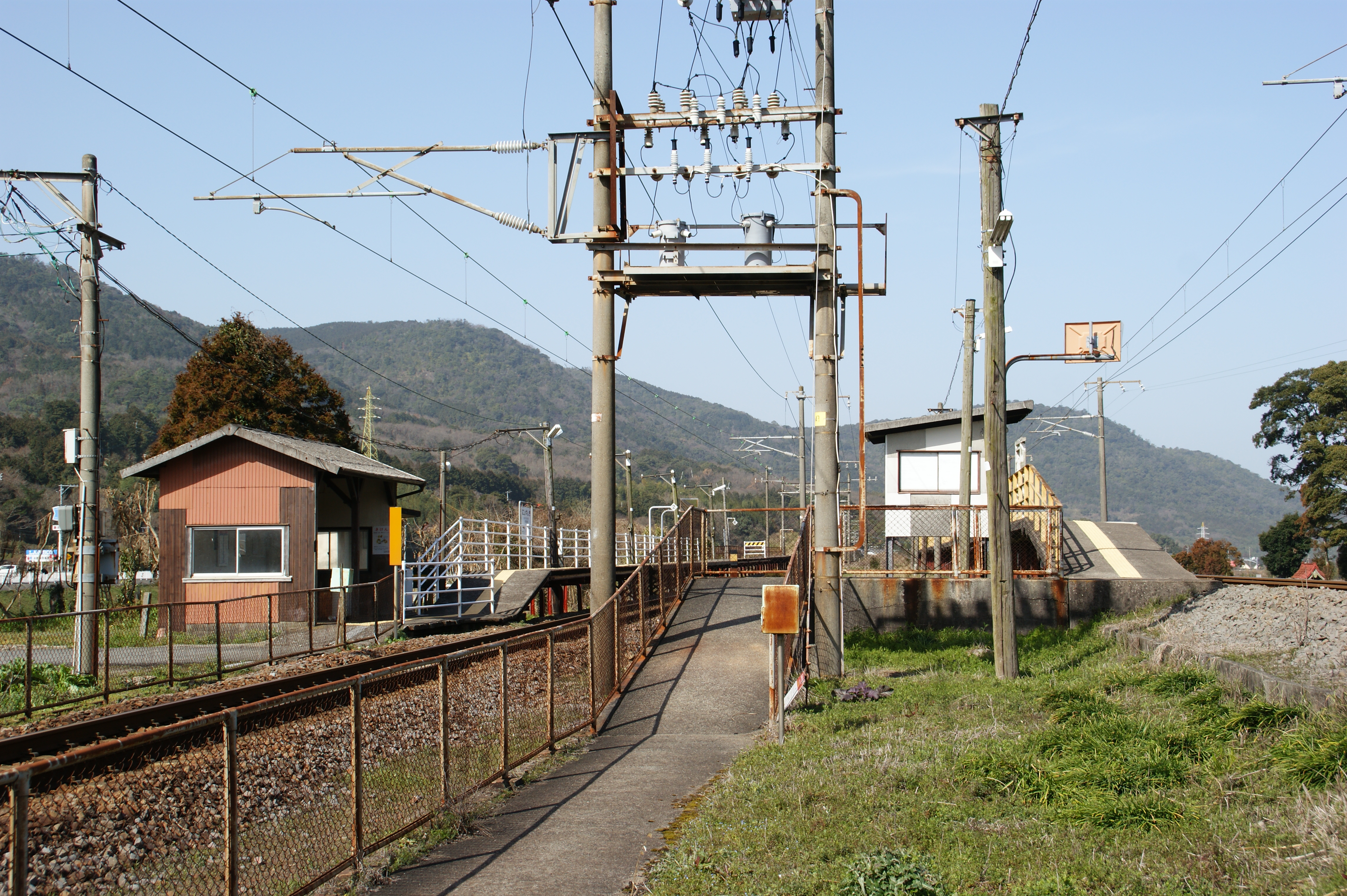
A view of the station platforms and tracks. Note that one track is at a higher level than the other.

== History ==
Japanese Government Railways (JGR) opened Nishiyashiki Signal Box on 1 September 1926 as an additional facility on the existing track of the Nippō Main Line. On 1 March 1947, Japanese National Railways (JNR), the postwar successor of JGR, upgraded the facility to a full station. With the privatization of JNR on 1 April 1987, the station came under the control of JR Kyushu.

== Passenger statistics ==
In fiscal 2015, there were a total of 4,713 boarding passengers, giving a daily average of 13 passengers.

== Surrounding area ==
- Japan National Route 10

== See also ==
- List of railway stations in Japan
