= Imazu Station (Ōita) =

Railway station in Nakatsu, Ōita Prefecture, Japan

Imazu Station 今津駅
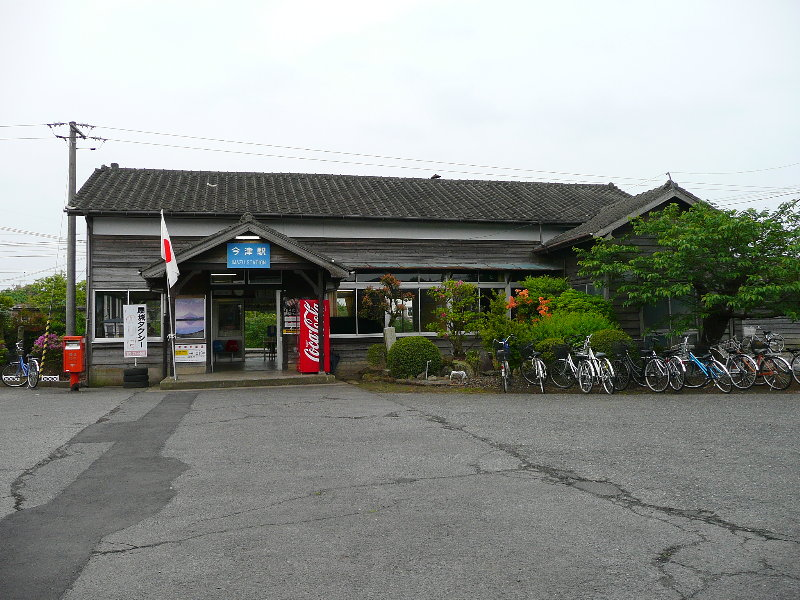
- Imazu Station in 2007

General information
- Location: Imazu, Nakatsu-shi, Ōita-ken 879-0101; Japan
- Coordinates: 33°34′19″N 131°16′03″E
- Operator: JR Kyushu
- Line: ■ Nippō Main Line
- Distance: 60.1 km from Kokura
- Platforms: 2 side platforms
- Tracks: 2

Construction
- Structure type: At grade
- Parking: Available at forecourt
- Accessible: No - platforms linked by footbridge

Other information
- Status: Kan'i itaku station
- Website: Official website

History
- Opened: 25 September 1897

Passengers
- FY2015: 136 daily

Services
Preceding station	JR Kyushu	Following station
Amatsu towards Kagoshima	Nippō Main Line	Higashi-Nakatsu towards Kokura
Location
- Location within Oita Prefecture Location within Japan

Imazu Station (今津駅, Imazu-eki)is a passenger railway station located in the city of Nakatsu, Ōita Prefecture, Japan. It is operated by JR Kyushu.

== Lines ==
The station is served by the Nippō Main Line and is located 60.1 km from the starting point of the line at Kokura.

== Layout ==
The station consists of two side platforms serving two tracks. Both tracks run on the south side of their respective platforms, suggesting that platform 2 was once an island platform but the middle line has been removed. The station building is a wooden structure of traditional Japanese design and houses a staffed ticket window, a waiting area and an automatic ticket vending machine. Access to the opposite side platform is by means of a footbridge.

JR Kyushu ceased to staff the station in March 2015. Thereafter, Nakatsu City authorities managed the ticket window on a kan'i itaku basis.

=== Platforms ===
1	■ ■ Nippō Main Line	for Nakatsu and Kokura
2	■ ■ Nippō Main Line	for Ōita and Miyazaki

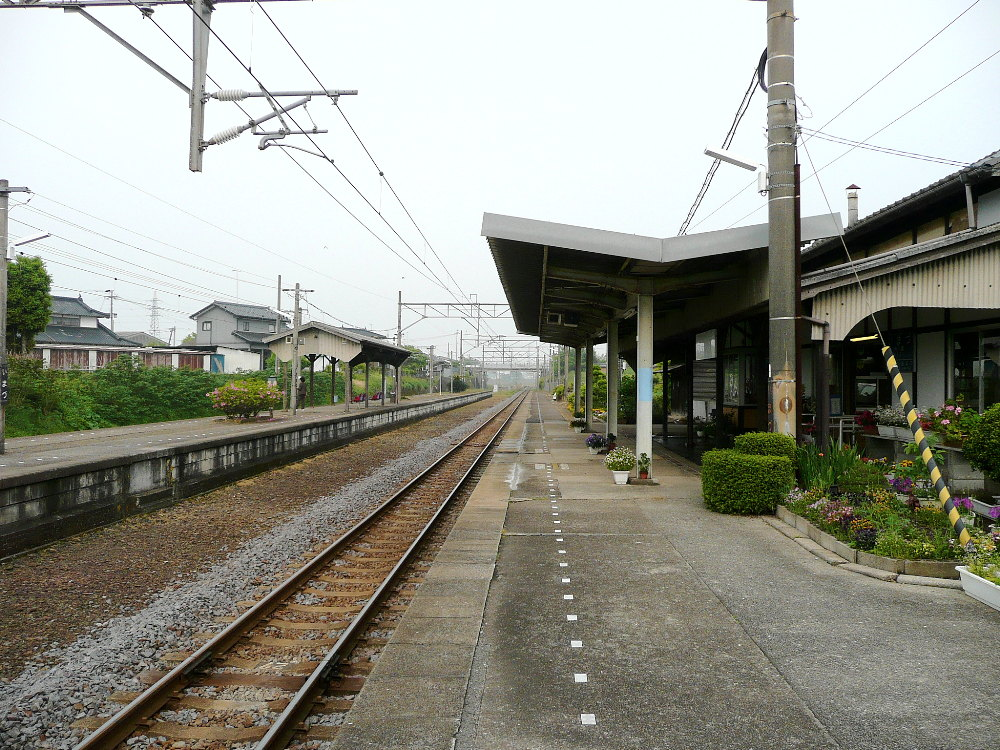
A view of the platforms and tracks. Note what appears to be the trackbed of a former track next to the platform to the left.

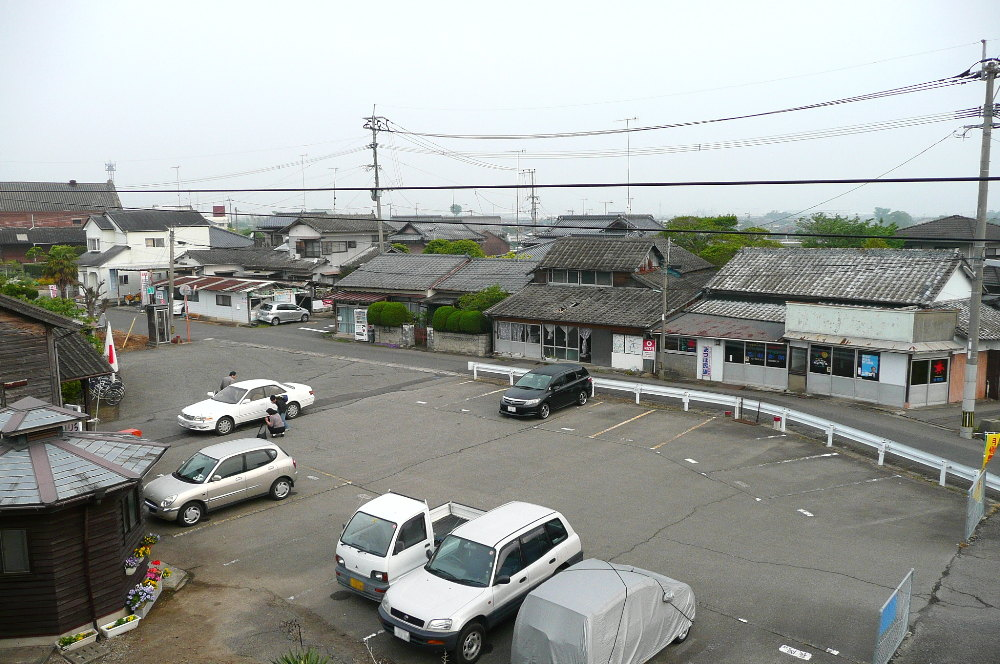
A view of the station forecourt.

== History ==
The private Hōshū Railway opened the station on 25 September 1897 as an intermediate station on the Hōshū Railway, a line which it had laid from Yukuhashi to Yanagigaura. The Hōshū Railway was acquired by the Kyushu Railway on 3 September 1901 and the Kyushu Railway was itself nationalised on 1 July 1907. Japanese Government Railways (JGR) designated the station as part of the Hōshū Main Line on 12 October 1909. On 15 December 1923, the station became part of the Nippō Main Line. With the privatization of Japanese National Railways (JNR), the successor of JGR, on 1 April 1987, the station came under the control of JR Kyushu.

== Passenger statistics ==
In fiscal 2015, there were a total of 49,464 boarding passengers, giving a daily average of 136 passengers.

== Surrounding area ==
- Nakatsu City Higashi-Nakatsu Junior High School
- Japan National Route 10

== See also ==
- List of railway stations in Japan
