= Kitsuki =

Kitsuki 杵築市
- City
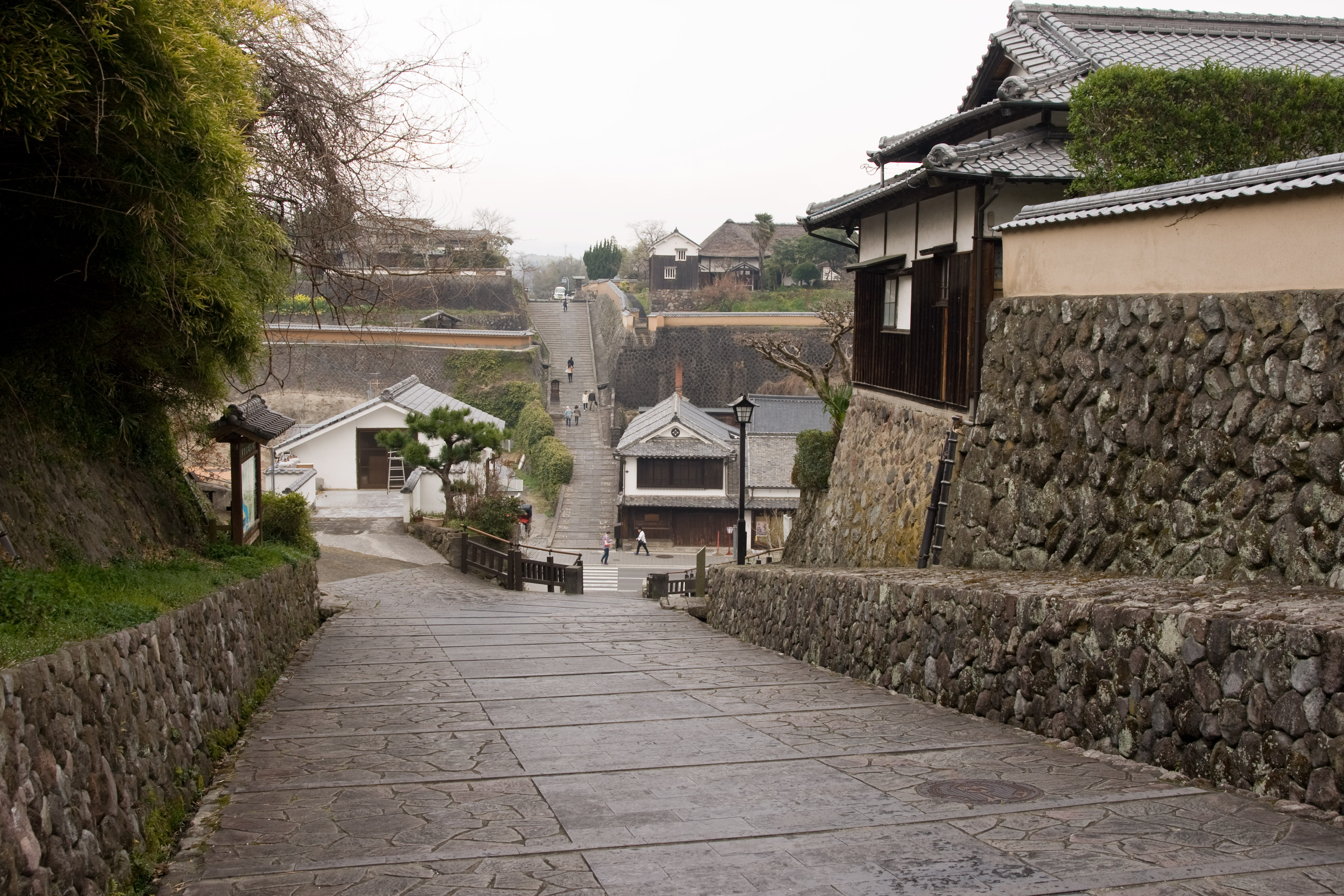
- Kitsuki castle town

- Flag Chapter

- Location in Japan
- Coordinates: 33°25′01″N 131°36′58″E
- Country: Japan
- Region: Kyushu
- Prefecture: Ōita

Government
  - Mayor: Kyosuke Yasaka (since June 2006)

Area
  - Total: 280.08 km^{2} (108.14 sq mi)

Population (October 31, 2023)
  - Total: 26,761
  - Density: 95.548/km^{2} (247.47/sq mi)
- Time zone: UTC+09:00 (JST)
- City hall address: 377-1 Oji Kitsuki, Kitsuki-shi, Oita-ken 873-0001
- Climate: Cfa
- Website: Official website
- Symbols
- Flower: Calanthe discolor
- Tree: Prunus mume

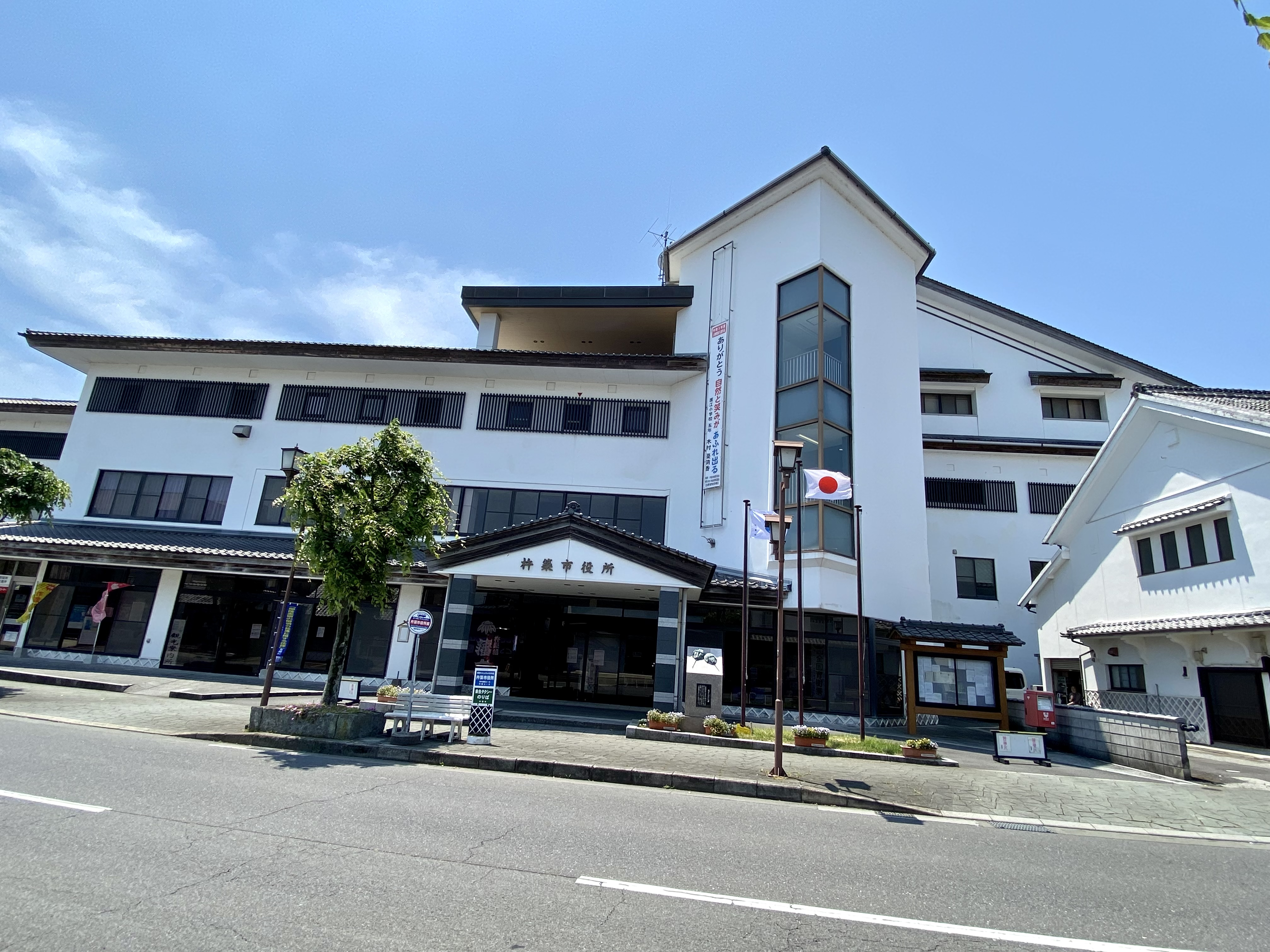
Kitsuki City Hall

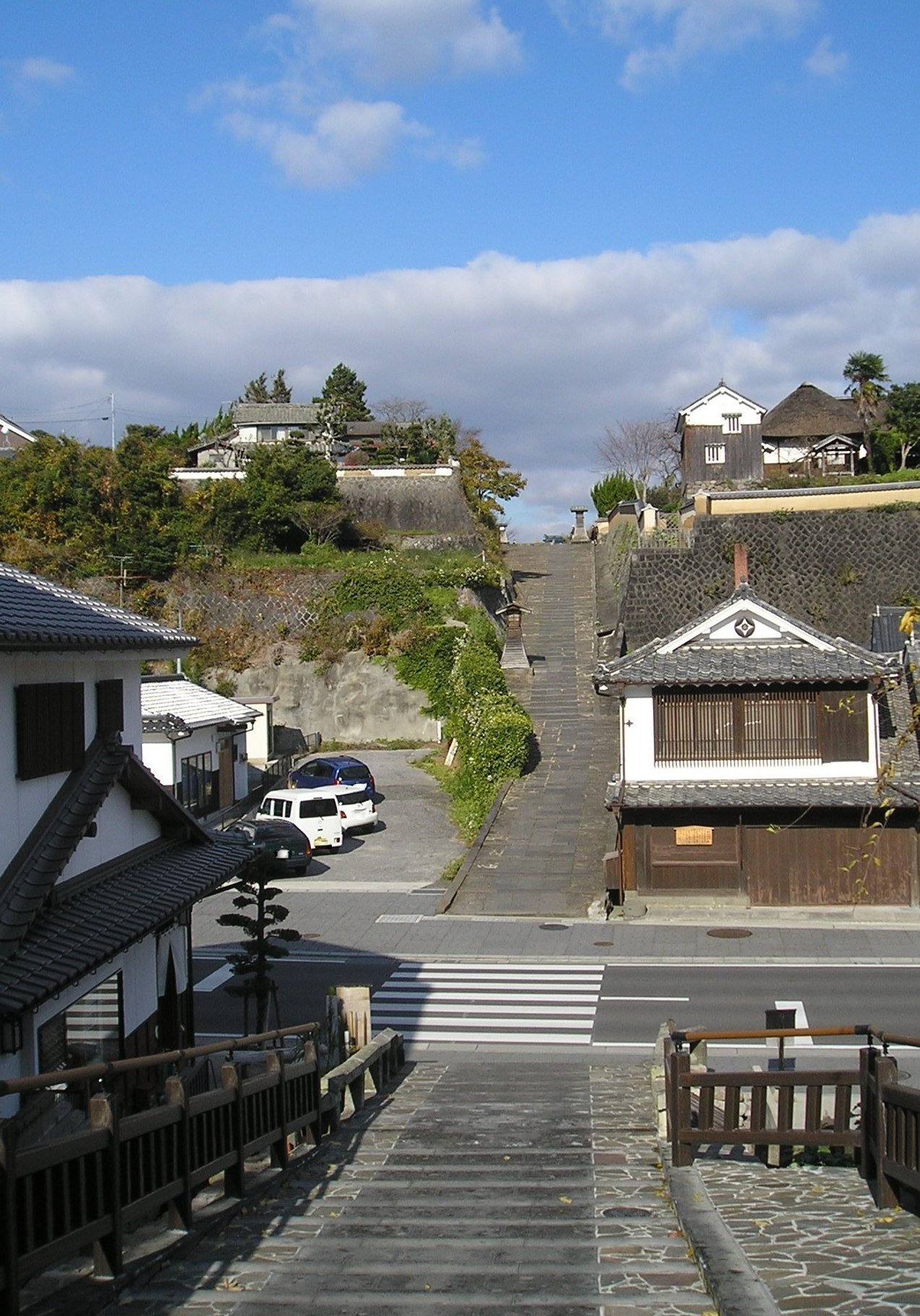
Suya no Saka Slope in Kitsuki samurai quarter

Kitsuki (杵築市, Kitsuki-shi) is a city located in Ōita Prefecture, Japan. As of 31 October 2023, the city had an estimated population of 26,761 in 13199 households, and a population density of 96 persons per km^{2}. The total area of the city is 280.08 km^{2} (108.14 sq mi).

== Geography ==
Kitsuki is located in east-central Ōita Prefecture at the southern tip of the Kunisaki Peninsula, across Beppu Bay from the prefectural capital at Ōita City. By land, it is approximately 35 kilometers from the center of Ōita City. The northern and western parts of the city are mountainous. Tateishi Pass, adjacent to Usa City, is the border between the former Bungo Province and Buzen Province.

=== Neighboring municipalities ===
Ōita Prefecture

- Bungo-Takada
- Hiji
- Kunisaki
- Usa

=== Climate ===
Kitsuki has a humid subtropical climate (Köppen climate classification Cfa) with hot summers and cool winters. Precipitation is significant throughout the year, but is somewhat lower in winter. The average annual temperature in Kitsuki is 15.8 °C (60.4 °F). The average annual rainfall is 1,524.6 mm (60.02 in) with June as the wettest month. The temperatures are highest on average in August, at around 26.8 °C (80.2 °F), and lowest in January, at around 5.3 °C (41.5 °F). The highest temperature ever recorded in Kitsuki was 37.4 °C (99.3 °F) on 18 August 2020; the coldest temperature ever recorded was −6.8 °C (19.8 °F) on 15 January 1985.

Climate data for Kitsuki (1991−2020 normals, extremes 1978−present)
Month	Jan	Feb	Mar	Apr	May	Jun	Jul	Aug	Sep	Oct	Nov	Dec	Year
Record high °C (°F)	19.4 (66.9)	24.0 (75.2)	28.8 (83.8)	30.4 (86.7)	33.0 (91.4)	35.1 (95.2)	37.0 (98.6)	37.4 (99.3)	35.6 (96.1)	32.3 (90.1)	28.3 (82.9)	24.2 (75.6)	37.4 (99.3)
Mean daily maximum °C (°F)	10.2 (50.4)	11.0 (51.8)	14.2 (57.6)	19.0 (66.2)	23.3 (73.9)	25.9 (78.6)	29.7 (85.5)	31.0 (87.8)	27.9 (82.2)	23.2 (73.8)	17.8 (64.0)	12.5 (54.5)	20.5 (68.9)
Daily mean °C (°F)	5.3 (41.5)	6.0 (42.8)	9.1 (48.4)	13.8 (56.8)	18.3 (64.9)	21.8 (71.2)	25.8 (78.4)	26.8 (80.2)	23.6 (74.5)	18.3 (64.9)	12.7 (54.9)	7.5 (45.5)	15.8 (60.3)
Mean daily minimum °C (°F)	0.7 (33.3)	1.1 (34.0)	3.9 (39.0)	8.3 (46.9)	13.3 (55.9)	18.3 (64.9)	22.7 (72.9)	23.5 (74.3)	20.0 (68.0)	13.8 (56.8)	7.8 (46.0)	2.7 (36.9)	11.3 (52.4)
Record low °C (°F)	−6.8 (19.8)	−6.7 (19.9)	−4.9 (23.2)	−2.3 (27.9)	2.1 (35.8)	9.5 (49.1)	14.9 (58.8)	17.1 (62.8)	9.9 (49.8)	2.2 (36.0)	−1.9 (28.6)	−5.0 (23.0)	−6.8 (19.8)
Average precipitation mm (inches)	47.1 (1.85)	59.9 (2.36)	98.0 (3.86)	118.0 (4.65)	133.5 (5.26)	287.7 (11.33)	255.3 (10.05)	135.4 (5.33)	184.7 (7.27)	107.7 (4.24)	63.4 (2.50)	49.2 (1.94)	1,524.6 (60.02)
Average precipitation days (≥ 1.0 mm)	6.7	7.9	10.0	9.6	9.1	13.2	12.1	9.3	9.8	6.8	6.5	6.5	107.5
Mean monthly sunshine hours	145.5	142.7	175.0	192.5	201.9	146.5	183.0	212.3	158.8	168.7	145.4	144.3	2,024.1
Source: Japan Meteorological Agency

=== Demographics ===
Per Japanese census data, the population of Kitsuki in 2020 is 27,999 people. Kitsuki has been conducting censuses since 1950.

Historical population
Year	Pop.	±%
1950	52,414	—
1955	50,544	−3.6%
1960	47,543	−5.9%
1965	42,617	−10.4%
1970	38,504	−9.7%
1975	36,299	−5.7%
1980	35,066	−3.4%
1985	34,816	−0.7%
1990	34,095	−2.1%
1995	33,370	−2.1%
2000	33,363	−0.0%
2005	33,567	+0.6%
2010	32,087	−4.4%
2015	30,185	−5.9%
2020	27,999	−7.2%
Kitsuki population statistics

== History ==
The area of Kitsuki was part of ancient Bungo Province. During the Edo period it was mostly under control of Kitsuki Domain and was ruled by a cadet branch of the Matsudaira clan, with smaller areas under control of Hiji Domain. After the Meiji restoration, the town of Kitsuki within Hayami District, Ōita was established on May 1, 1889 with the creation of the modern municipalities system. On April 1, 1955 Kitsuki merged with the villages of Yasaka, Kita-Kitsuki and, Nakarie and was raised to city status. On October 1, 2005 Kitsuki merged with the town of Yamaka from Hayami District and the village of Ota from Nishikunisaki District, Ōita

== Government ==
Kitsuki has a mayor-council form of government with a directly elected mayor and a unicameral city council of 18 members. Kitsuki contributes one member to the Ōita Prefectural Assembly. In terms of national politics, the city is part of the Ōita 3rd district of the lower house of the Diet of Japan.

== Economy ==
Agriculture, forestry and fisheries are the main industries, but due to its favorable location between Oita Airport and Ōita City/Beppu City, advanced technology industries, such as semiconductor production are now established.

== Education ==
Kitsuki has 15 public elementary schools and three public junior high schools operated by the city government and one public high school operated by the Ōita Prefectural Board of Education.

== Transportation ==
=== Railways ===
JR Kyushu - Nippō Main Line

- Tateishi - Naka-Yamaga - Kitsuki

=== Highways ===
- Ōita Airport Road
- National Route 10
- National Route 213

== Local attractions ==
- Kitsuki Castle

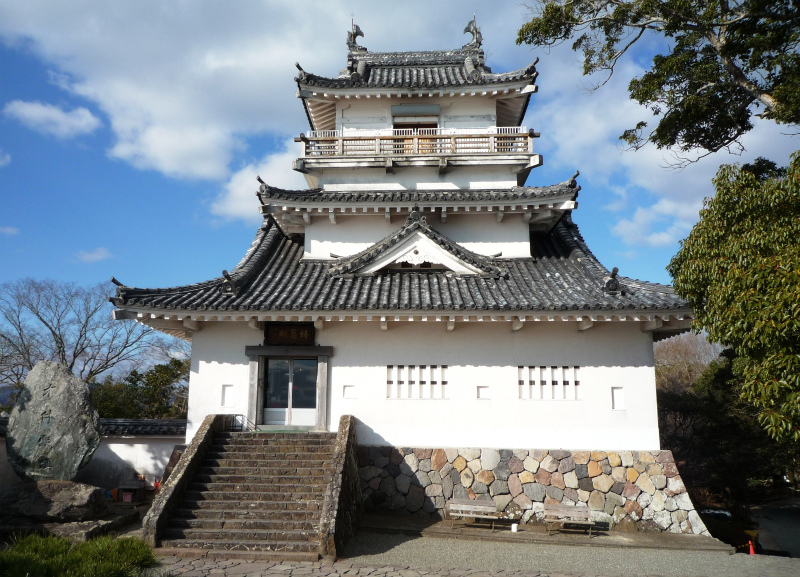
Kitsuki Castle

== Notable people from Kitsuki ==
- Asada Goryu, physician and astronomer
- Teikichi Hori, admiral in the Imperial Japanese Navy
- Soemu Toyoda, admiral in the Imperial Japanese Navy
