= Yanagigaura Station =

Railway station in Usa, Ōita Prefecture, Japan

Yanagigaura Station 柳ヶ浦駅
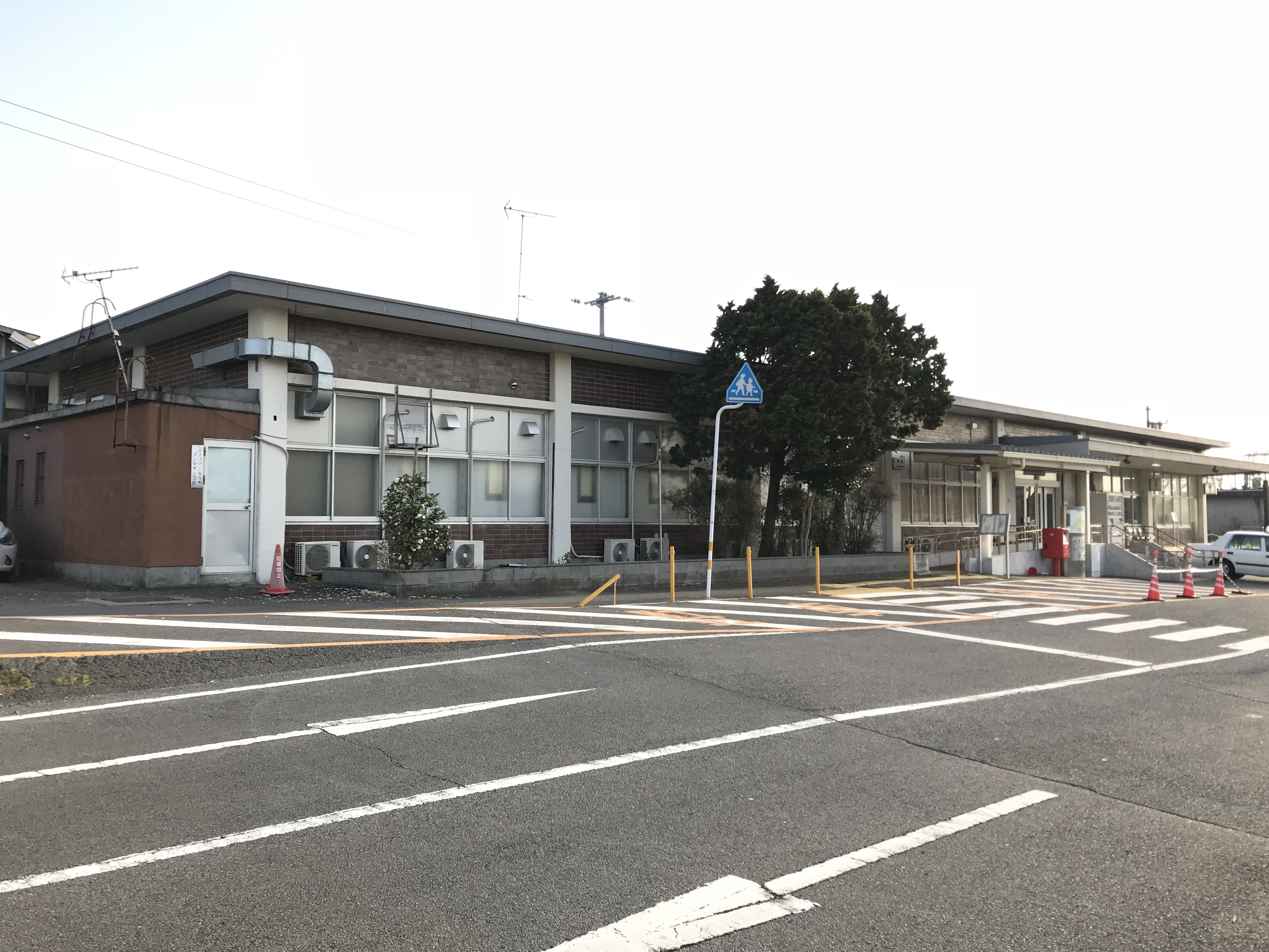
- Yanagigaura Station in April 2018

General information
- Location: 1 Chome-2582-2 Sumiyoshimachi, Usa-shi, Ōita-ken 872-0033; Japan
- Coordinates: 33°33′55″N 131°21′45″E
- Operator: JR Kyushu
- Line: ■ Nippō Main Line
- Distance: 69.1 km from Kokura
- Platforms: 1 side + 1 island platforms
- Tracks: 3 + multiple sidings

Construction
- Structure type: At grade

Other information
- Status: Staffed (Midori no Madoguchi)
- Website: Official website

History
- Opened: 22 April 1911
- Former names: Nagasu (until 1 March 1898); Usa (until 15 October 1909)

Passengers
- FY2016: 688 daily
- Rank: 211th (among JR Kyushu stations)

Services
Preceding station	JR Kyushu	Following station
Buzen-Nagasu towards Kagoshima	Nippō Main Line	Buzen-Zenkōji towards Kokura
Location
- Location within Oita Prefecture Location within Japan

Yanagigaura Station (柳ヶ浦駅, Yanagigaura-eki) is a passenger railway station located in the city of Usa, Ōita Prefecture, Japan. It is operated by JR Kyushu.

== Lines ==
The station is served by the Nippō Main Line and is located 69.1 km from the starting point of the line at Kokura.

== Layout ==
The station consists of one side platform and one island platform connected by a footbridge with an elevator. Platform 1 on the side platform is mainly used for outbound trains, platform 3 on the south side of the island platform is mainly used for inbound trains, and platform 2 on the north side of the island platform is used for evacuation of trains on the up and down lines and for trains departing from this station. Additionally, there is a secondary main track for upbound trains that does not have a platform on the south side of platform 3.

In the past, there was a Yanagigaura Engine Depot and there was a section with a steep gradient of 25/1000 around Tateishi Pass, so reorganizing train formations and connecting auxiliary equipment was carried out at this station. This was resolved in 1966 with the opening of the Shin Tateishi Tunnel". As a remnant of this, eight siding tracks remain on the south side of the upstream main track, one of which is used for parking track for maintenance vehicles, and the other seven are used for overnight parking of commercial vehicles. The station is a subcontracted station where JR Kyushu Service Support is entrusted with station operations, and there is a Midori no Madoguchi staffed ticket office.

=== Platforms ===
1	■ ■ Nippō Main Line	for Beppu and Ōita
2, 3	■ ■ Nippō Main Line	for Nakatsu and Kokura

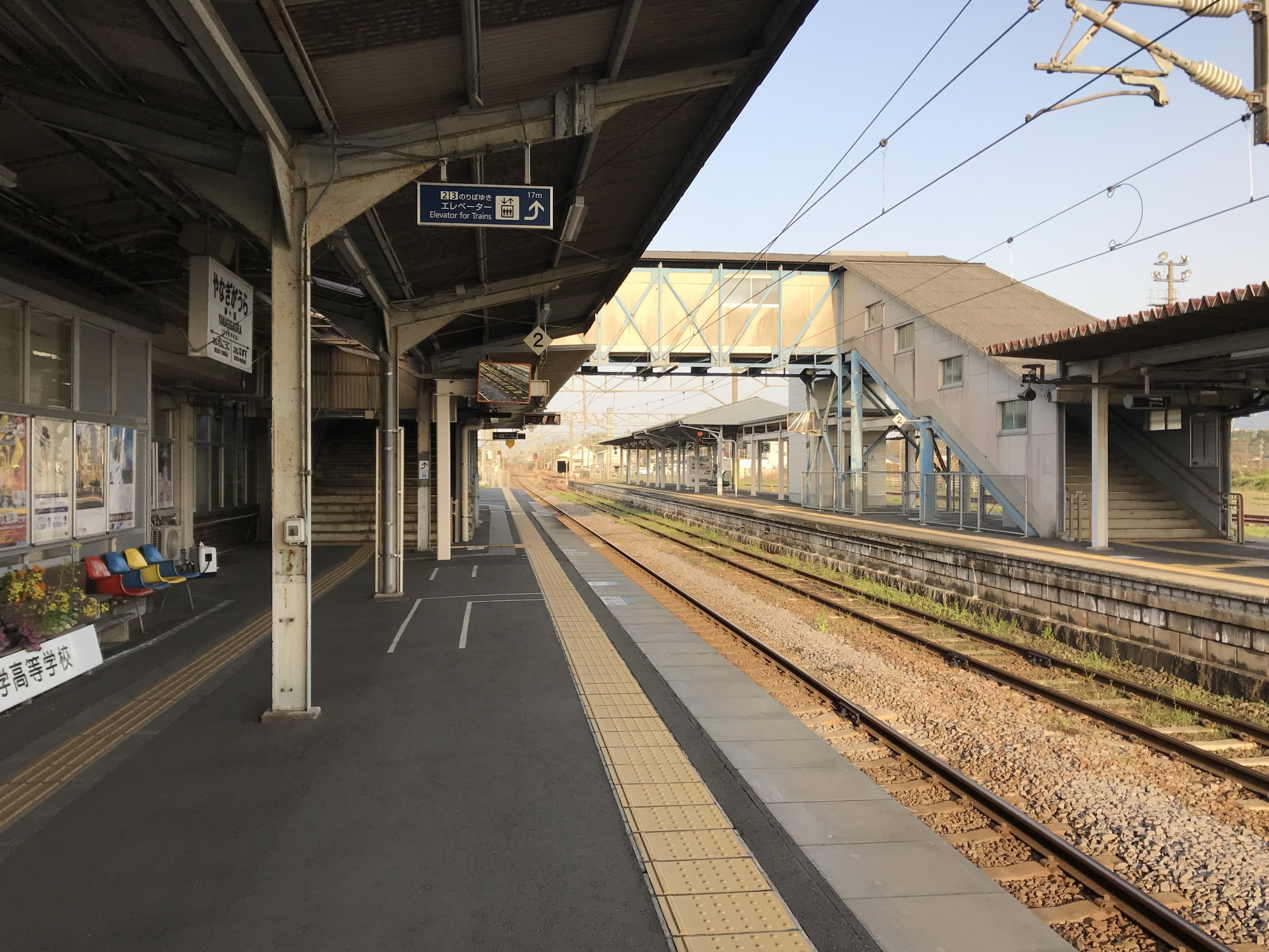
View of the platforms and tracks.

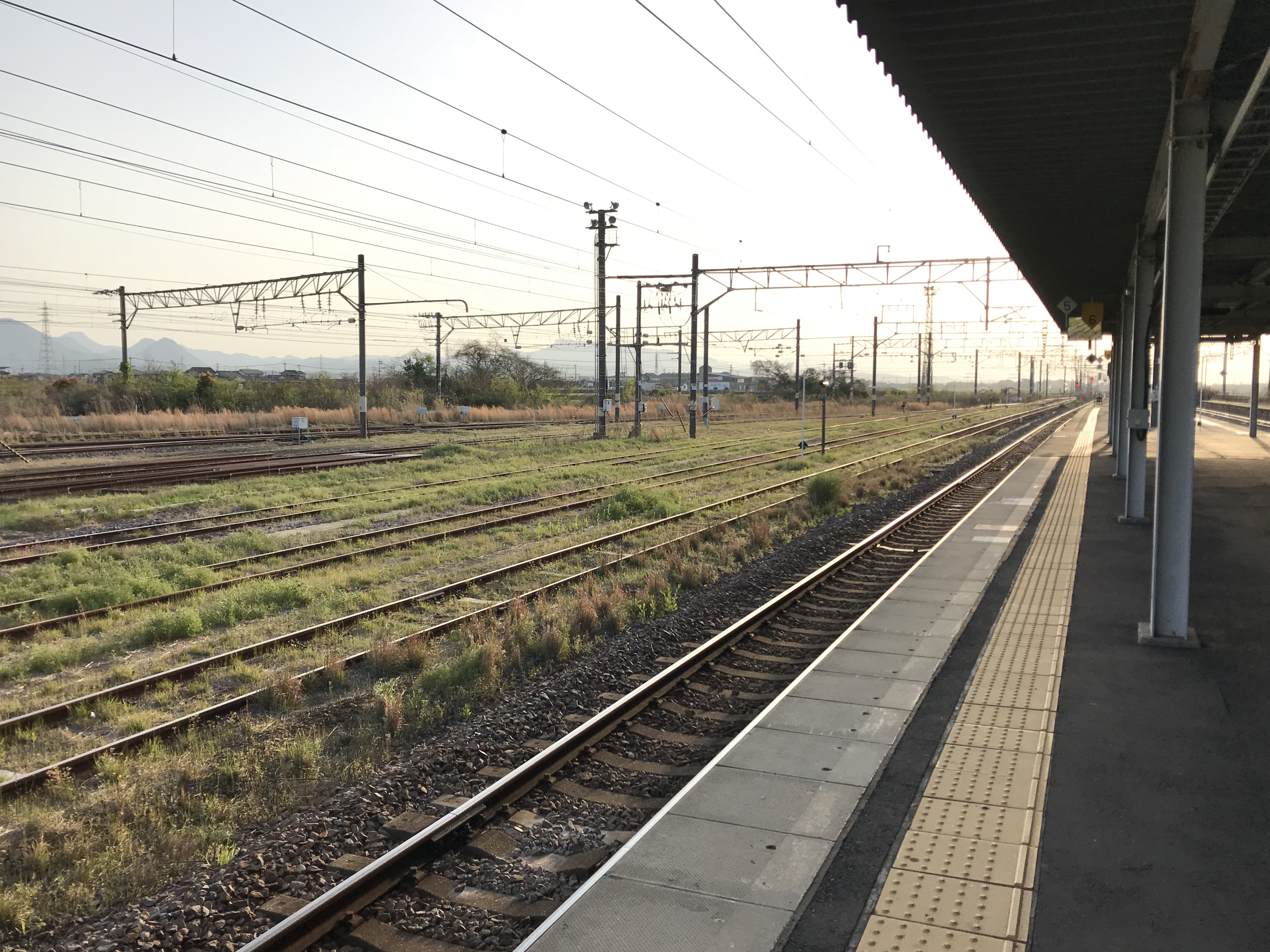
A view of the sidings south of the station.

== History ==
The private Hōshū Railway opened the station on 25 September 1897 with the name Nagasu (長洲) as the southern terminus of a line it had laid from Yukuhashi. On 1 March 1898, the station name was changed to Usa (宇佐). The Hōshū Railway was acquired by the Kyushu Railway on 3 September 1901 and the Kyushu Railway was itself nationalised on 1 July 1907. Japanese Government Railways (JGR) designated the station as part of the Hōshū Main Line on 12 October 1909. Three days later, on 15 October 1909, the station was renamed Yanagigaura. JGR extended the track southwards from here to the present Usa on 21 December 1909. On 15 December 1923, the station became part of the Nippō Main Line. With the privatization of Japanese National Railways (JNR), the successor of JGR, on 1 April 1987, the station came under the control of JR Kyushu.

== Passenger statistics ==
In fiscal 2016, the station was used by an average of 688 passengers daily (boarding passengers only), and it ranked 211th among the busiest stations of JR Kyushu.

== Surrounding area ==
- Oita Prefectural Museum of History

== See also ==
- List of railway stations in Japan
