= Nakatsu Station (Ōita) =

Railway station in Nakatsu, Ōita Prefecture, Japan

Nakatsu Station 中津駅
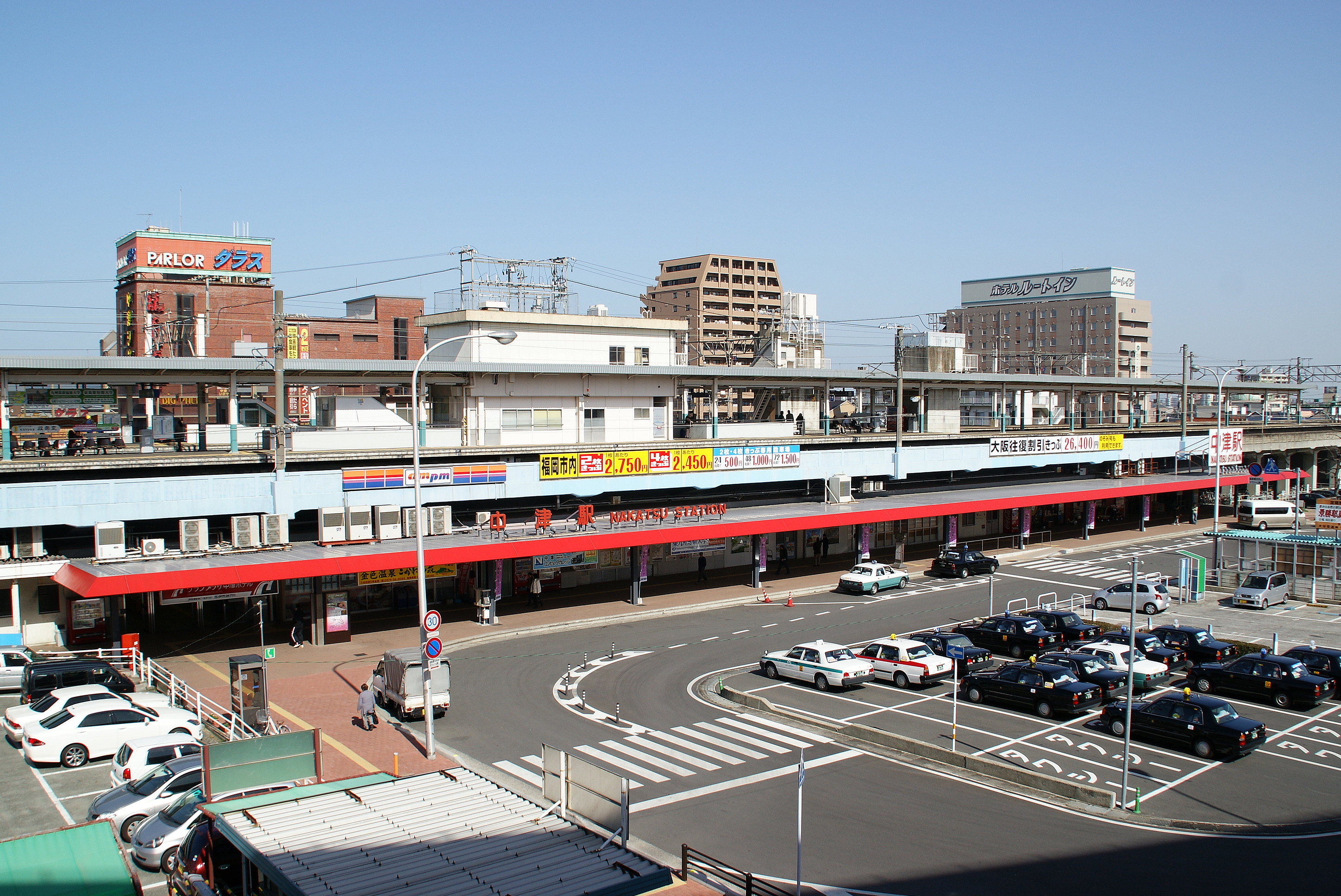
- Nakatsu Station in February 2009

General information
- Location: 219-2 Shimada, Nakatsu-shi, Ōita-ken 871-0034; Japan
- Coordinates: 33°35′57″N 131°11′27″E
- Operator: JR Kyushu
- Line: ■ Nippō Main Line
- Distance: 51.8 km from Kokura
- Platforms: 2 island platforms
- Tracks: 4

Construction
- Structure type: Elevated

Other information
- Status: Staffed (Midori no Madoguchi )
- Website: Official website

History
- Opened: 25 September 1897

Passengers
- FY2016: 3117 daily

Services
Preceding station	JR Kyushu	Following station
Higashi-Nakatsu towards Kagoshima	Nippō Main Line	Yoshitomi towards Kokura
Location
- Location within Oita Prefecture Location within Japan

Nakatsu Station (中津駅, Nakatsu-eki) is a passenger railway station located in the city of Nakatsu, Ōita Prefecture, Japan. It is operated by JR Kyushu.

== Lines ==
The station is served by the Nippō Main Line and is located 51.8 km from the starting point of the line at Kokura.

== Layout ==
The station consists of two elevated island platforms serving four tracks with the station building underneath. The station has a Midori no Madoguchi staffed ticket office.

=== Platforms ===
1	■ ■ Nippō Main Line	for Kokura and Hakata for Ōita and Miyazaki
2	■ ■ Nippō Main Line	for Ōita and Miyazaki (express trains)
3	■ ■ Nippō Main Line	for Kokura and Hakata (express trains)
4	■ ■ Nippō Main Line	for Kokura and Hakata for Ōita and Miyazaki

== History ==
The station was opened on September 25, 1897 with the opening of the private Hōshū Railway between Yukuhashi and Yanagigaura. The Hōshū railway was acquired by the Kyushu Railway on September 3, 1903. The Kyushu Railway was nationalised on 1 July 1907. Japanese Government Railways (JGR), designated the track as the Hōshū Main Line on 12 October 1909 and expanded it southwards in phases. On 15 December 1923, the Hōshū Main Line was renamed the Nippō Main Line. The elevated station was completed in 1975. With the privatization of Japanese National Railways (JNR), the successor of JGR, on 1 April 1987, the station came under the control of JR Kyushu.

== Passenger statistics ==
In fiscal 2016, the station was used by an average of 3,117 passengers daily (boarding passengers only).

== Surrounding area ==
- Nakatsu City Hall
- Nakatsu Castle
- Higashikyushu Junior College
- Higashikyushu Ryukoku High School
- Oita Prefectural Nakatsu Higashi High School

== See also ==
- List of railway stations in Japan
