= Aira, Kagoshima =

Aira 姶良市
- City
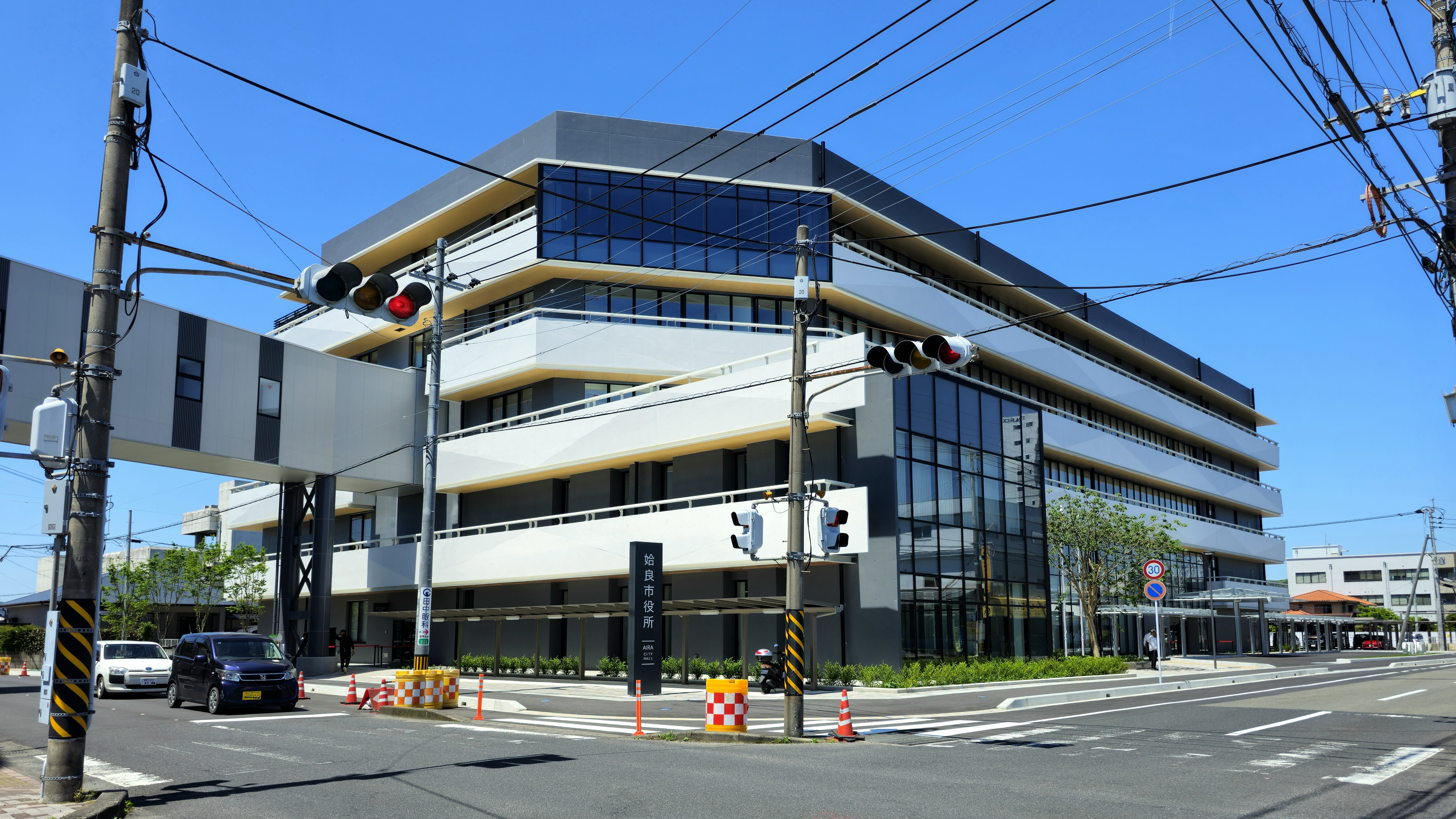
- Aira City Hall

- Flag Seal
- Interactive map of Aira
- Location in Japan
- Coordinates: 31°43′42″N 130°37′40″E
- Country: Japan
- Region: Kyūshū
- Prefecture: Kagoshima
- Kajiki town settled: June 1, 1912
- Gamō town settled: November 1, 1928
- Aira town settled: January 1, 1955
- Three towns merged: March 23, 2010

Government
  - Mayor: Makiko Yonemaru (米丸真希子) - from April 2026

Area
  - Total: 231.25 km^{2} (89.29 sq mi)

Population (April 1, 2024)
  - Total: 77,948
  - Density: 337.07/km^{2} (873.01/sq mi)
- Time zone: UTC+09:00 (JST)
- Phone number: 0995-66-3111
- Address: 25 Miyajimamachi, Aira-shi, Kagoshima-ken 899-5492
- Climate: Cfa
- Website: Official website
- Symbols
- Flower: Cerasus jamasakura Rhododendron
- Tree: Cinnamomum camphora

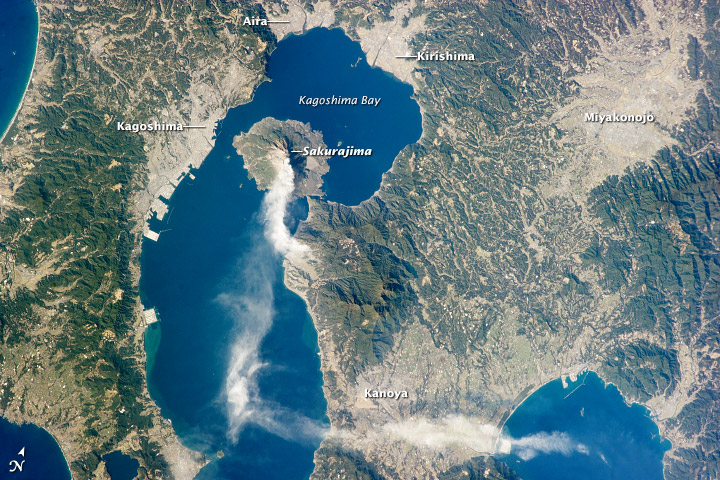
Aira and its surroundings as taken with a Nikon D3S from the International Space Station.

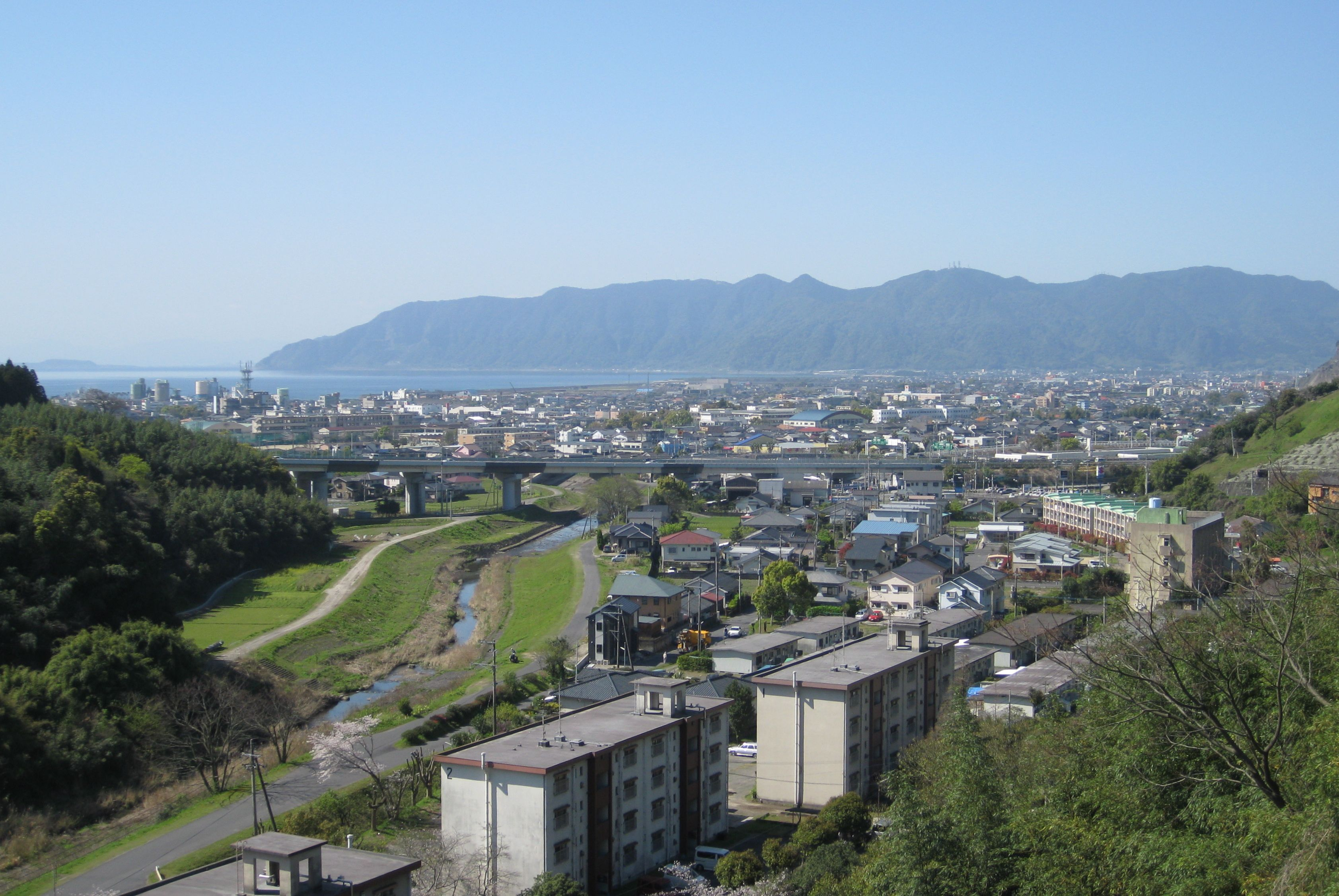
Panoramic view of Aira

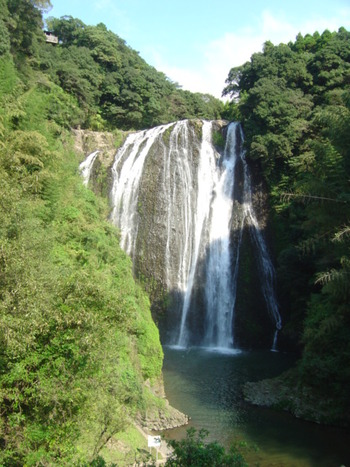
Ryūmonji Falls

Aira (姶良市, Aira-shi; Japanese pronunciation: [ä́ì.ɾä̀, ä̀í.ɾä́(.ɕì)]) is a city located in Kagoshima Prefecture, Japan. It is located west of Kirishima and north of Kagoshima. As of 29 February 2024, the city had an estimated population of 78,104 in 38912 households, and a population density of 340 persons per km². The total area of the city is 231.25 km^{2} (89.29 sq mi).

== History ==
The area of Aira was part of ancient Ōsumi Province, and there is evidence of continuous habitation since the Japanese Paleolithic period. The area was a stronghold of the Hayato people, many of whom had migrated to this location after being forced out of their territories in central Kyushu, and was one of the sites of the Hayato Rebellion of 720. In the Heian period, the area came under the control of the Okura clan, who claimed descent from Emperor Ling of Han, whose descendants fled to Japan. The region was contested in the Nanboku-chō period, gradually coming under control of the Shimazu clan in the 15th century. During the Edo Period the area was under the control of Kagoshima Domain. After the Meiji restoration, the villages of Chōsa, Kajiki, Kamō, Mizobe, Shigetomi and Yamada were established in Aira District on May 1, 1889 with the creation of the modern municipalities system. Kajiki gained town status on June 1, 1912 followed by Kamō on November 1, 1928. Kajiki was bombed twice in World War II, killing 43 people, including 14 students from the former Kajiki Junior High School (currently Kagoshima Prefectural Kajiki High School). The town of Aira was established on January 1, 1955 by the merger of the town of Chōsa and village of Shigetomi. Aira, Kajiki, and Kamō merged to form the city of Aira on March 23, 2010.

== Geography ==
Aira extends approximately 25 kilometers from north-to-south and approximately 24 kilometers from east-to-west in central Kagoshima Prefecture. Part of the southeast side faces Kagoshima Bay. In the area facing Kagoshima Bay, four rivers flow from the west: the Oshikawa River, the Beppu River, the Amikake River, and the Hikiyama River.The alluvial plains of these rivers come together to form the Aira Plain, which contains the main urban area. Natural beaches remain on the coast leading to Kagoshima City on the west side and the coast near the border with Kirishima City on the east side, but the rest is an artificial coast formed by reclaimed land. The northern part of Aira City is lined with mountains belonging to the Kitasatsu Volcanic Group, and the border with Satsumasendai City on the northwest side almost forms the watershed with the Sendai River basin. A tributary of the Beppu River flows between these mountains, and several villages have developed along it. On the other hand, between Kirishima City and Kirishima City on the northeast side, there is a continuous plateau called Jusanzukahara, and tributaries of the Amikake River and Hikiyama River flow into it from the Kirishima City side.

The border with Kagoshima City on the southwest side is the Muregaoka Mountain Range, which has an altitude of around 500 meters, and drops sharply into the plains of Aira City and the coastline. On the north side of the Muregaoka Mountain Range, the Omoi River flows from the Kagoshima City side, and the relatively low-elevation land connects to the center of the former Yoshida Town, which merged with Kagoshima City.

A volcano that once existed in the northern part of Kagoshima Bay caused an eruption called the Great Aira Eruption about 25,000 years ago, forming the Aira Caldera. Aira City is located on the northwest side of this caldera, on the somma, and there is a stratum called Shirasu, which originated from pyroclastic flows that flowed out during a large eruption. Other topographical features within the city that originate from volcanic activity include Yonemaru and Sumiyoshi Pond, both of which are said to be marls.

Approximately 65% of Aira's area is forested. The central plains are well-developed paddy fields, and the area on the plateau bordering Kirishima City on the northeast is an upland farming area.

=== Neighboring municipalities ===
Kagoshima Prefecture

- Kagoshima
- Kirishima
- Satsuma
- Satsumasendai

=== Climate ===
Aira has a humid subtropical climate (Köppen climate classification Cfa). The average annual temperature is about 17 °C (63 °F), and the annual rainfall is about 2,200 mm (87 in). Most of the rainfall is concentrated from June to September.

Typhoons often strike from summer to autumn. In addition, Sakurajima is located about 20 km south of the city, and volcanic ash may fall when a northerly wind blows during volcanic activity. As with other cities, towns and villages in the mainland of Kagoshima Prefecture, the forecast of wind direction over Sakurajima, which is reported in the weather forecast, is of great concern.

Climate data for Aira, Kagoshima
Month	Jan	Feb	Mar	Apr	May	Jun	Jul	Aug	Sep	Oct	Nov	Dec	Year
Daily mean °C (°F)	5.7 (42.3)	8.1 (46.6)	9.0 (48.2)	14.0 (57.2)	19.4 (66.9)	24.4 (75.9)	29.0 (84.2)	29.1 (84.4)	25.7 (78.3)	21.2 (70.2)	13.7 (56.7)	8.3 (46.9)	17.3 (63.2)
Average precipitation mm (inches)	115.0 (4.53)	183.5 (7.22)	145.5 (5.73)	263.5 (10.37)	209.0 (8.23)	427.0 (16.81)	460.0 (18.11)	222.5 (8.76)	133.5 (5.26)	—	107.5 (4.23)	58.5 (2.30)	—
Source: 気象観測

=== Demography ===
According to Japanese census data, this is the population of Aira in recent years.

Historical population

Year	Pop.	±%
1920	45,008	—
1925	46,192	+2.6%
1930	48,069	+4.1%
1935	48,198	+0.3%
1940	46,749	−3.0%
1945	65,023	+39.1%
1950	65,252	+0.4%
1955	62,892	−3.6%
1960	57,292	−8.9%
1965	52,891	−7.7%
1970	51,608	−2.4%

Year	Pop.	±%
1975	55,540	+7.6%
1980	62,992	+13.4%
1985	66,830	+6.1%
1990	68,789	+2.9%
1995	71,762	+4.3%
2000	73,640	+2.6%
2005	74,840	+1.6%
2010	74,817	−0.0%
2015	75,173	+0.5%
2020	76,348	+1.6%

Aira population statistics

== Government ==
Aira has a mayor-council form of government with a directly elected mayor and a unicameral city council of 24 members. Aira contributes two members to the Kagoshima Prefectural Assembly. In terms of national politics, the city is part of the Kagoshima 3rd district of the lower house of the Diet of Japan.

== Economy ==
Aira has a mixed economy centering on agriculture, fishing, forestry and light manufacturing and food processing.

== Education ==
Aira has 19 public elementary schools and five public junior high schools operated by the city government and four public high schools operated by the Kagoshima Prefectural Board of Education. There is also one private elementary school.

== Transportation ==
=== Railways ===
JR Kyushu - Nippō Main Line

■ Kajiki - Kinkō - Chōsa - Aira - Shigetomi - Ryūgamizu

=== Highways ===
- Kyushu Expressway
- Higashikyushu Expressway
- National Route 10

== Local attractions ==
- Ryūmon-daki, one of Japan's 100 Waterfalls

== Notable people from Aira ==
- Kota Ibushi - Japanese professional wrestler
- Shoji Jo - professional football player
- Munenori Kawasaki - professional baseball player

== See also ==
- Aira Caldera
