= Kajiki =

Kajiki may refer to:

- Kajiki, Kagoshima
  - Kajiki Station
- Typhoon Kajiki
- Kajiki Ryota

== See also ==
- Marlin - translated to Kajiki in Japanese
