= Kinkō Station =

Railway station in Aira, Kagoshima Prefecture, Japan

Kinkō Station 錦江駅
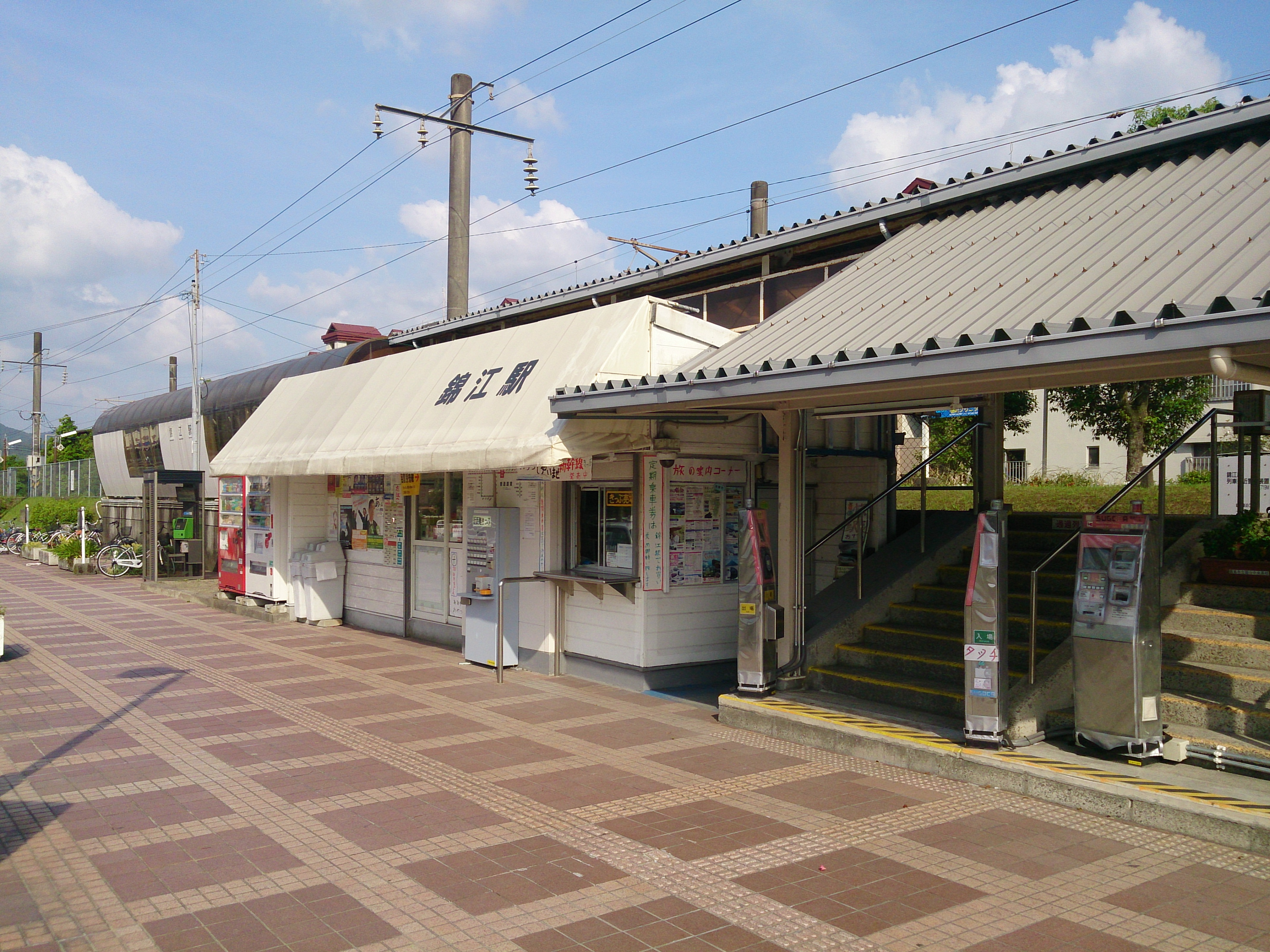
- Kinkō Station in 2013

General information
- Location: Kajiki-chō Kida, Aira-shi, Kagoshima-ken 899-5241; Japan
- Coordinates: 31°44′13″N 130°39′12″E
- Operator: JR Kyushu
- Line: ■ Nippō Main Line
- Distance: 443.3 kilometres (275.5 mi) from Kokura
- Platforms: 1 side platform
- Tracks: 1

Construction
- Structure type: Low embankmment
- Parking: Available at forecourt
- Cycle facilities: Bike shed
- Accessible: No - steps to platform

Other information
- Status: Unstaffed
- Website: Official website

History
- Opened: 3 March 1986

Passengers
- FY2022: 451 daily
- Rank: 245th (JR Kyushu)

Services
Preceding station	JR Kyushu	Following station
Chōsa towards Kagoshima	Nippō Main Line	Kajiki towards Kokura
Location
- Location within Kagoshima Prefecture Location within Japan

Kinkō Station (錦江駅, Kinkō-eki) is a passenger railway station located in the city of Aira, Kagoshima, Japan. It is operated by JR Kyushu and is on the Nippō Main Line.

== Lines ==
The station is served by the Nippō Main Line and is located 443.3 km from the starting point of the line at Kokura.

== Layout ==
The station consists of a side platform serving a single track on a low embankment set in a largely residential area. The station building is a simple modern, functional, structure with a canvas roof situated at the base of the embankment and which once housed a kiosk and ticket window but which has since become unstaffed. An automatic ticket vending machine and SUGOCA card readers are provided. There is no waiting area. Next to the station building, a short flight of steps leads up to the platform. Parking is available at the station forecourt. To one side is a large brick-paved plaza where bike sheds have been installed.

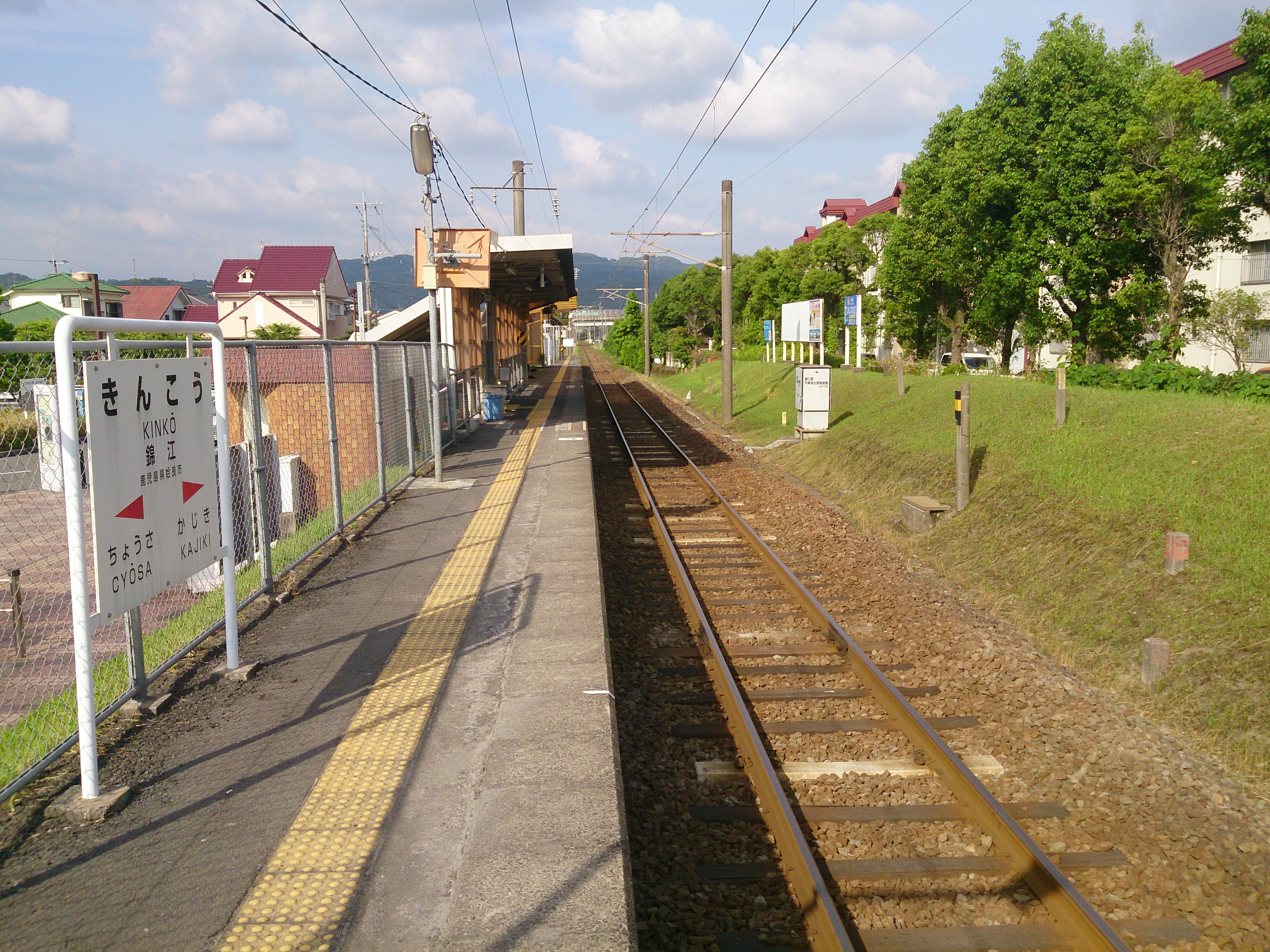
A view of the platform.

== Platforms ==
1	■ ■ Nippō Main Line	for Miyazaki for Kagoshima

== History ==
The station was opened on 3 March 1986 by Japanese National Railways (JNR) as an additional station on the exiting track of the Nippō Main Line. With the privatization of JNR on 1 April 1987, the station came under the control of JR Kyushu.

In January 2015, JR Kyushu announced that Kinkō would become an unstaffed station from 14 March 2015. This was part of a major effort by the company to reduce its operating deficit by ceasing to staff 32 stations in its network.

== Passenger statistics ==
In fiscal 2022, the station was used by an average of 451 passengers daily (boarding passengers only), and it ranked 245th among the busiest stations of JR Kyushu.

== Nearby places ==
- Aira City Kajiki Elementary School
- Aira City Kinkō Elementary School

== See also ==
- List of railway stations in Japan
