= Aira Station =

Railway station in Aira, Kagoshima Prefecture, Japan

Aira Station 姶良駅
- Aira Station in 2026

General information
- Location: Nishimochida, Aira-shi, Kagoshima-ken 899-5431; Japan
- Coordinates: 31°42′55″N 130°37′24″E
- Operator: JR Kyushu
- Line: ■ Nippō Main Line
- Distance: 447.1 kilometres (277.8 mi) from Kokura
- Platforms: 1 side platform
- Tracks: 1

Construction
- Structure type: Low embankment
- Cycle facilities: Bike shed
- Accessible: No - steps to platform

Other information
- Status: Staffed ticket window (outsourced)
- Website: Official website

History
- Opened: 13 March 1988

Passengers
- FY2022: 974 daily
- Rank: 158th (JR Kyushu)

Services
Preceding station	JR Kyushu	Following station
Shigetomi towards Kagoshima	Nippō Main Line	Chōsa towards Kokura
Location
- Location within Kagoshima Prefecture Location within Japan

Aira Station (姶良駅, Aira-eki) is a passenger railway station located in the city of Aira, Kagoshima, Japan. It is operated by JR Kyushu and is on the Nippō Main Line.

== Lines ==
The station is served by the Nippō Main Line and is located 447.1 km from the starting point of the line at Kokura.

== Layout ==
The station consists of a side platform serving a single track on a low embankment in a fairly confined area. There is no station building. At the base of the embankment, a shed has been set up which houses a staffed ticket window. To one side of this, there is a sheltered waiting area with some seats. On the other side of the ticket window are automatic ticket vending machines and a SUGOCA card reading and a short flight of steps leading up to the platform. The platform is generally very narrow. At one point where the platform is wider, some seats and a SUGOCA charge machine are provided. Bike sheds are provided at the station forecourt.

Management of the passenger facilities at the station has been outsourced to the JR Kyushu Tetsudou Eigyou Co., a wholly owned subsidiary of JR Kyushu specialising in station services. It staffs the ticket booth which is equipped with a POS machine but does not have a Midori no Madoguchi facility.

== Platforms ==
1	■ ■ Nippō Main Line	for Miyazaki for Kagoshima

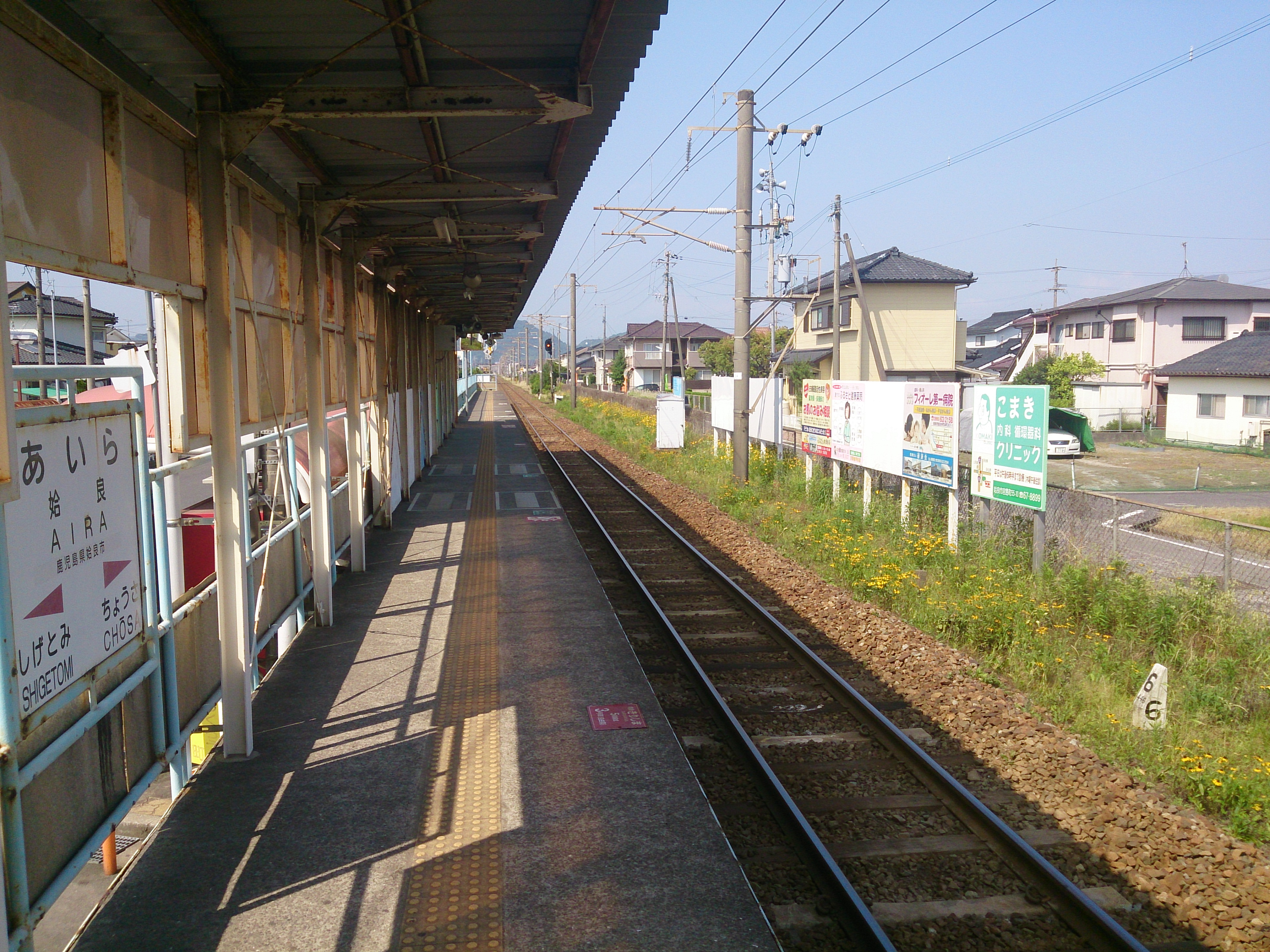
A view of the station platform.

== History ==
The station was opened on 13 March 1988 by JR Kyushu as an additional station on the existing track of the Nippō Main Line.

== Passenger statistics ==
In fiscal 2022, the station was used by an average of 974 passengers daily (boarding passengers only), and it ranked 158th among the busiest stations of JR Kyushu.

== Nearby places ==
- Shigetomi Junior High School
- Hiramatsu Post office

== See also ==
- List of railway stations in Japan
