= Shigetomi Station =

Railway station in Aira, Kagoshima Prefecture, Japan

Shigetomi Station 重富駅
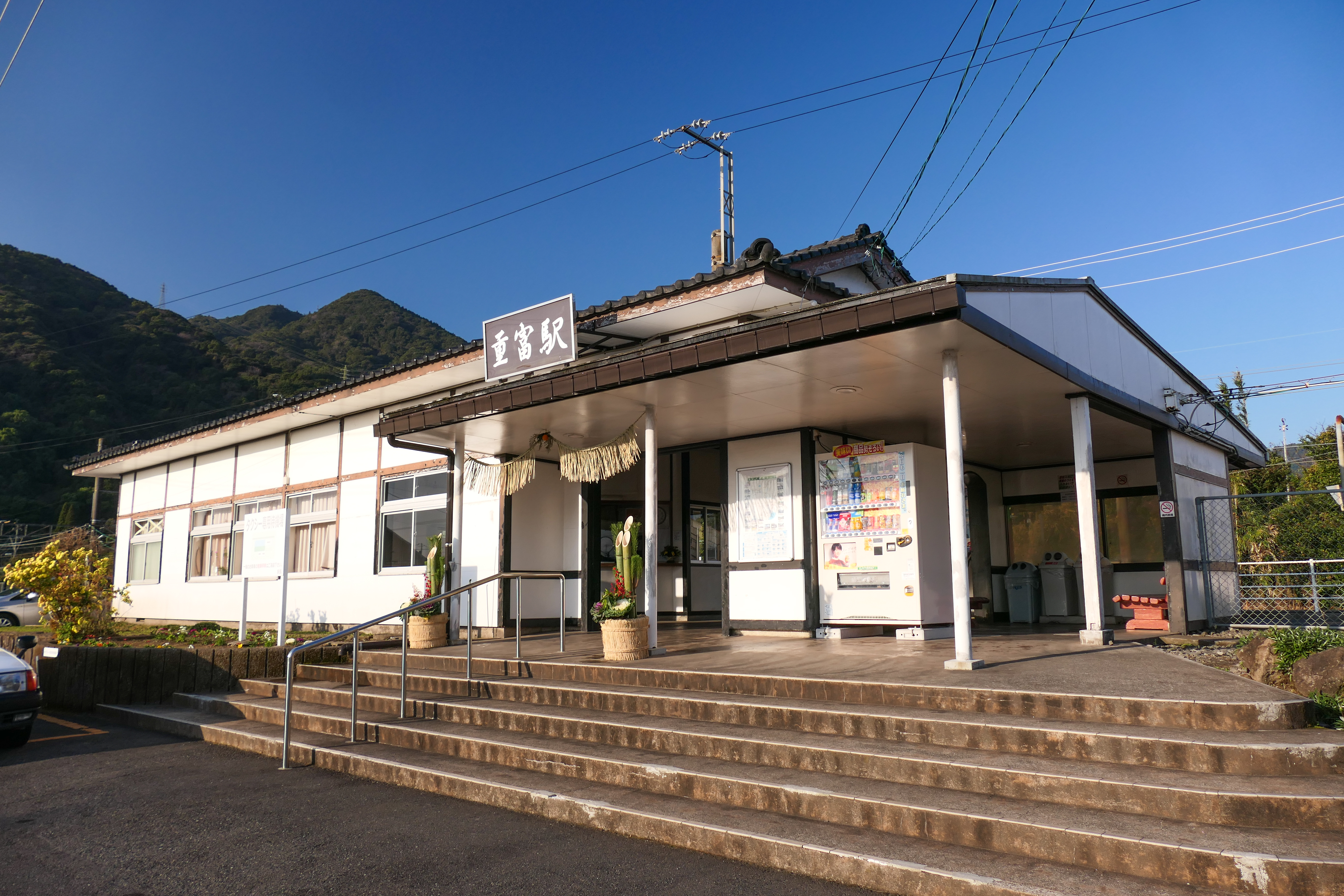
- Shigetomi Station, January 2022

General information
- Location: 3001 Wakimoto, Aira-shi, Kagoshima-ken 899-5651; Japan
- Coordinates: 31°42′9.9″N 130°36′50.8″E
- Operator: JR Kyushu
- Line: ■ Nippō Main Line
- Distance: 448.7 kilometres (278.8 mi) from Kokura
- Platforms: 2 side platforms

Construction
- Structure type: At grade

Other information
- Status: Staffed ticket window (Midori no Madoguchi) (outsourced)
- Website: Official website

History
- Opened: 10 June 1901

Passengers
- FY2022: 445 daily
- Rank: 247th (JR Kyushu)

Services
Preceding station	JR Kyushu	Following station
Ryūgamizu towards Kagoshima	Nippō Main Line	Aira towards Kokura
Location
- Location within Kagoshima Prefecture Location within Japan

Shigetomi Station (重富駅, Shigetomi-eki) is a passenger railway station located in the city of Aira, Kagoshima, Japan. It is operated by JR Kyushu and is on the Nippō Main Line.

== Lines ==
The station is served by the Nippō Main Line and is located 448.7 km from the starting point of the line at Kokura.

== Layout ==
The station consists of two side platforms serving two tracks at grade. The station buildingwas renovated in 1950 and has a Japanese-style appearance. It houses a waiting area, automatic ticket vending machines, a SUGOCA card reader and a staffed ticket window. Access to the opposite side platform is by means of a footbridge.

== Platforms ==
1	■ ■ Nippō Main Line	for Kagoshima and Kagoshima-Chūō
2	■ ■ Nippō Main Line	for Hayato, Miyakonojō and Miyazaki

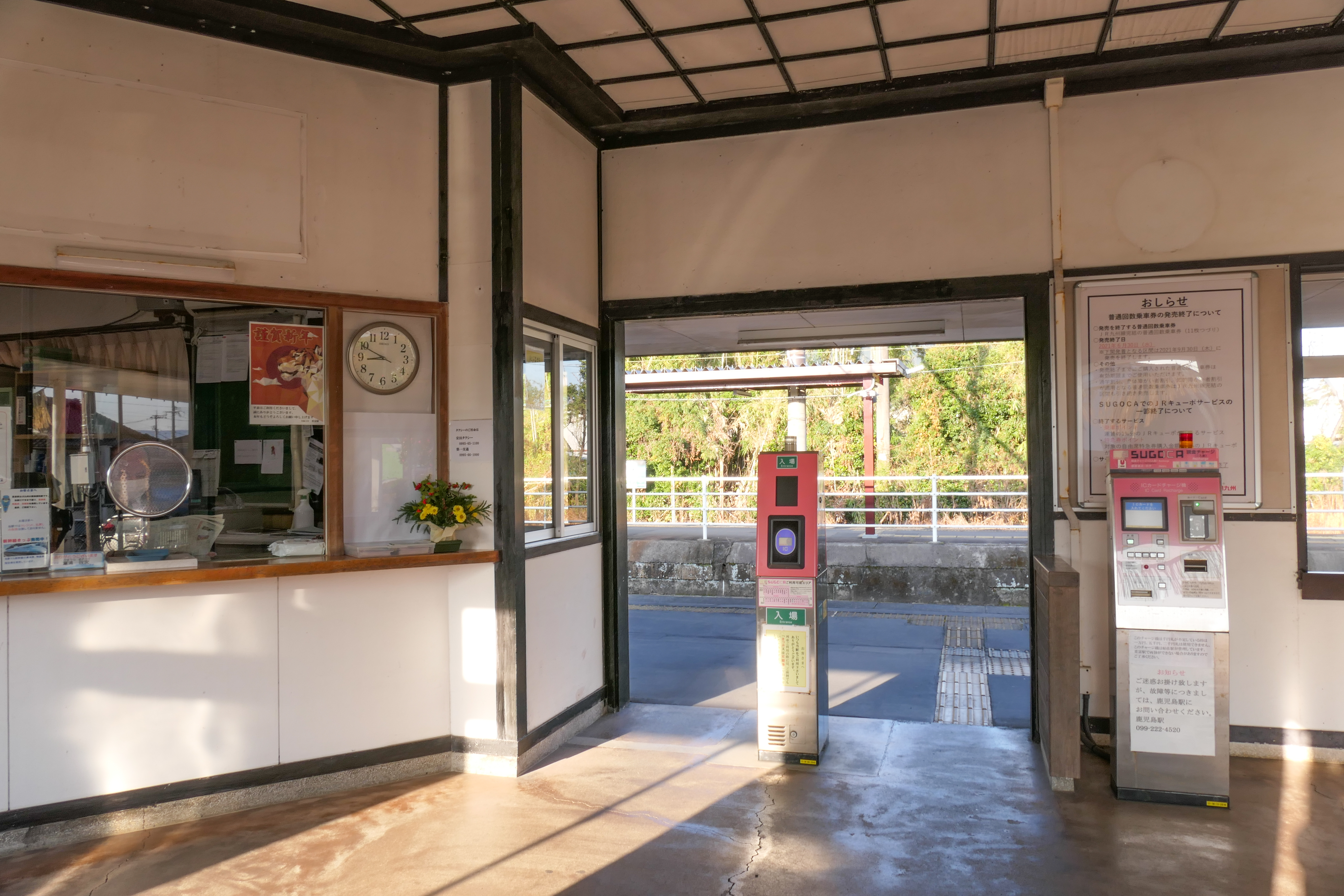
Ticket Gate

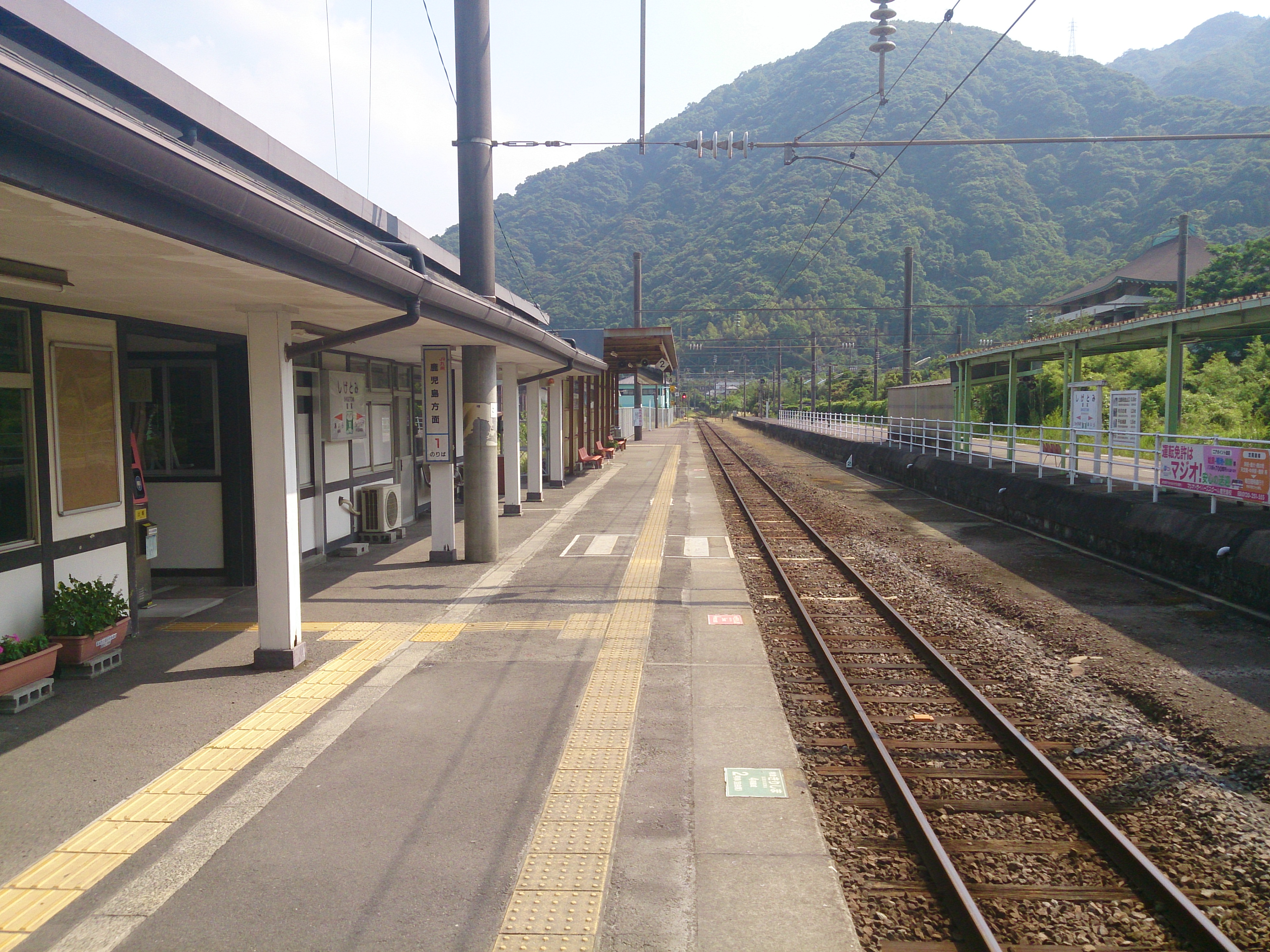
Platform 1

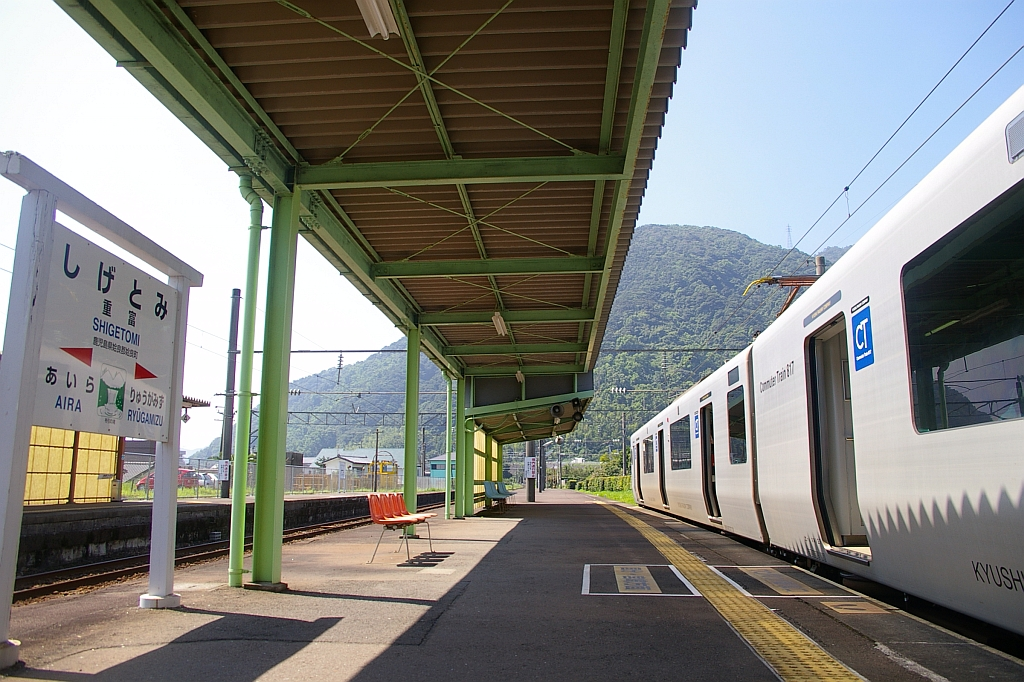
Platform 2

== History ==
On 10 June 1901, Japanese Government Railways (JGR) opened the then Kagoshima Line from Kagoshima to Kokubu (now Hayato). On the same day, Shigetomi was opened as one of several intermediate stations along the track. By 1909, the Kagoshima Line had linked up with the Hitoyoshi line reaching south from Yatsushiro. Through traffic was achieved between Mojikō in the north of Kyushu to Kagoshima in the south. The entire stretch of track from Mojikō through Kokubu and Kajiki to Kagoshima was redesignated as the Kagoshima Main Line on 21 November 1909. By 1927, another track from Yatsushiro through Sendai to Kagoshima had been built and this was now designated as part of the Kagoshima Main Line. Shigetomi, with the other stations on the older route then became part of the Hisatsu Line on 17 October 1927. By the end of 1932, further expansion and link ups with other networks to the east of Kokubu resulted in another line providing through-traffic to the north of Kyushu, from Kokura to Kagoshima. The entire stretch of track down the east coast of Kyushu from Kokura through Kajiki to Kagoshima then redesignated as the Nippō Main Line on 6 December 1932. With the privatization of Japanese National Railways (JNR), the successor of JGR, on 1 April 1987, the station came under the control of JR Kyushu.

== Passenger statistics ==
In fiscal 2022, the station was used by an average of 445 passengers daily (boarding passengers only), and it ranked 247th among the busiest stations of JR Kyushu.

== Surrounding area ==
- Shigetomi Onsen
- Prefectural Aira Hospital
- Ishigura Museum (Shirokane Sake Brewery)
- Japan National Route 10

== See also ==
- List of railway stations in Japan
