= Chōsa Station =

Railway station in Aira, Kagoshima Prefecture, Japan

Chōsa Station 帖佐駅
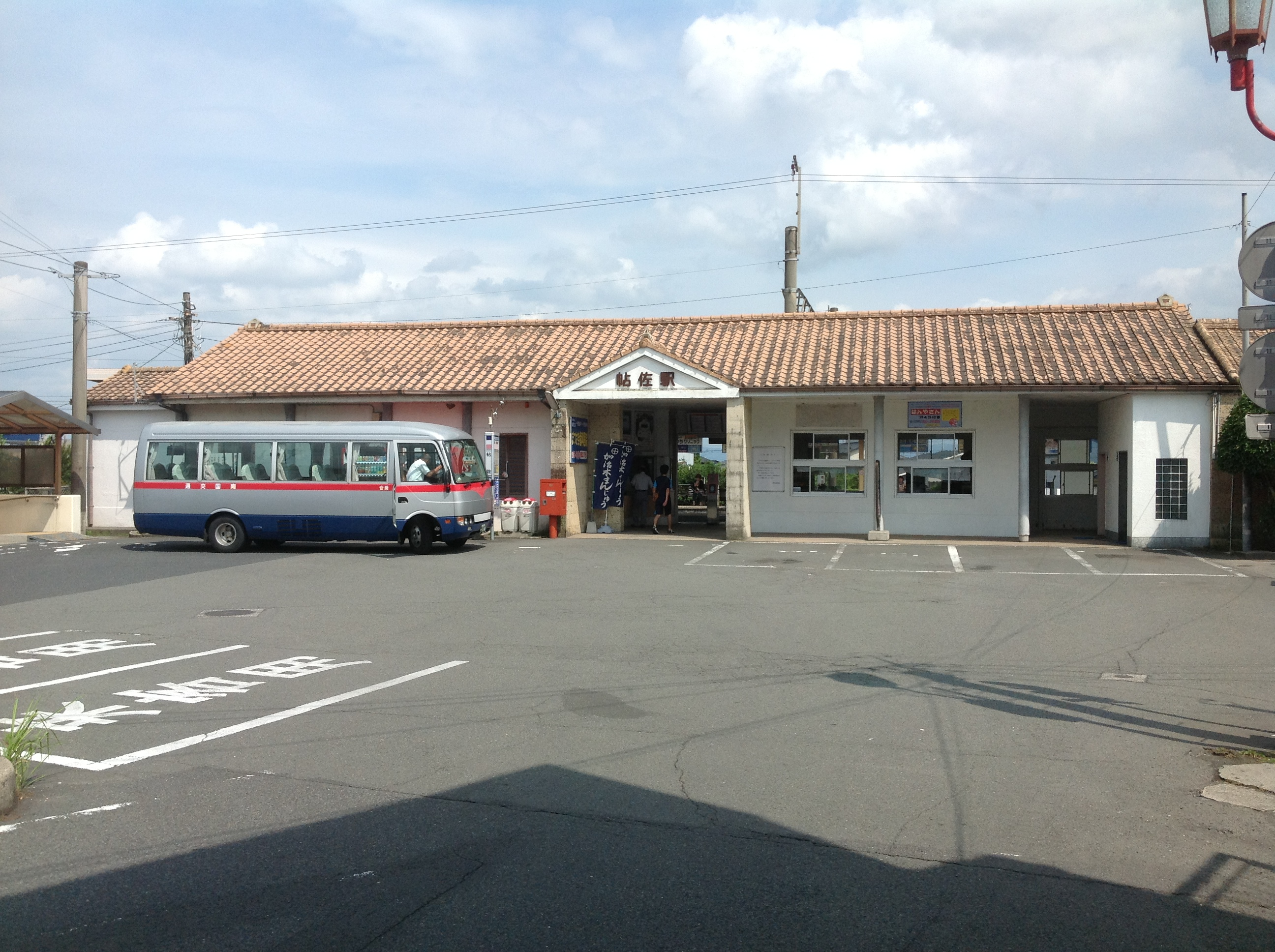
- Chōsa Station in 2013

General information
- Location: Higashimochida, Aira-shi, Kagoshima-ken 899-5421; Japan
- Coordinates: 31°43′37″N 130°37′58″E
- Operator: JR Kyushu
- Line: ■ Nippō Main Line
- Distance: 445.5 kilometres (276.8 mi) from Kokura
- Platforms: 1 side + 1 island platforms
- Tracks: 3

Construction
- Structure type: At grade
- Parking: Available at forecourt
- Accessible: No - platforms linked by footbridge

Other information
- Status: Staffed ticket window (outsourced)
- Website: Official website

History
- Opened: 1 April 1926

Passengers
- FY2022: 1417 daily
- Rank: 118th (JR Kyushu)

Services
Preceding station	JR Kyushu	Following station
Aira towards Kagoshima	Nippō Main Line	Kinkō towards Kokura
Location
- Location within Kagoshima Prefecture Location within Japan

Chōsa Station (帖佐駅, Chōsa-eki) is a passenger railway station located in the city of Aira, Kagoshima, Japan. It is operated by JR Kyushu and is on the Nippō Main Line.

== Lines ==
The station is served by the Nippō Main Line and is located 445.5 km from the starting point of the line at Kokura.

== Layout ==
The station consists of a side platform and an island platform serving three tracks at grade. The station building is a wooden building in European-style with a sloping tiled roof. It houses a waiting area, automatic ticket vending machines, SUGOCA card readers and a staffed ticket window. Access to the island platform is by means of a footbridge.

Management of the passenger facilities at the station has been outsourced to the JR Kyushu Tetsudou Eigyou Co., a wholly owned subsidiary of JR Kyushu specialising in station services. It staffs the ticket booth which is equipped with a POS machine but does not have a Midori no Madoguchi facility.

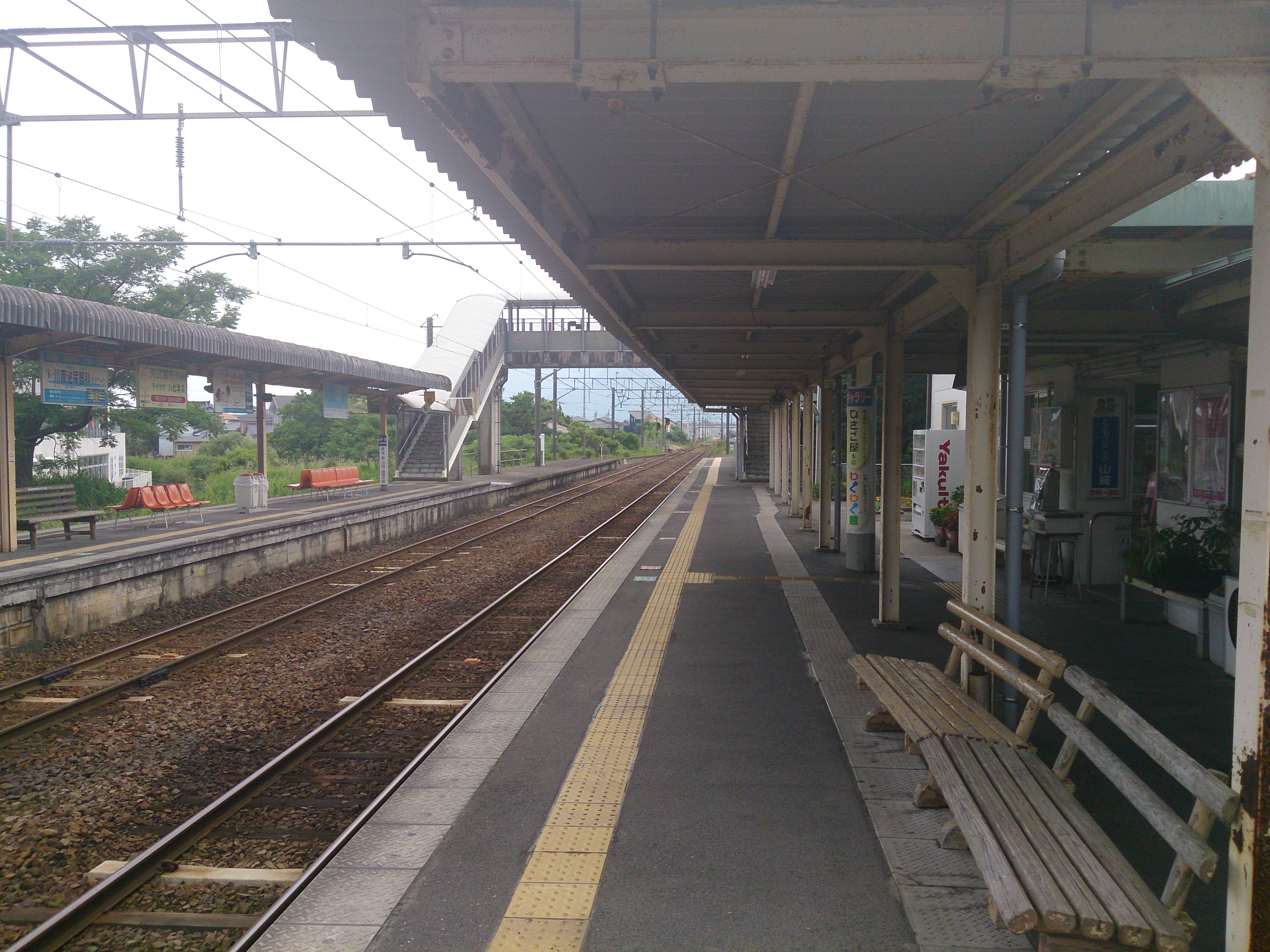
A view of platforms and tracks.

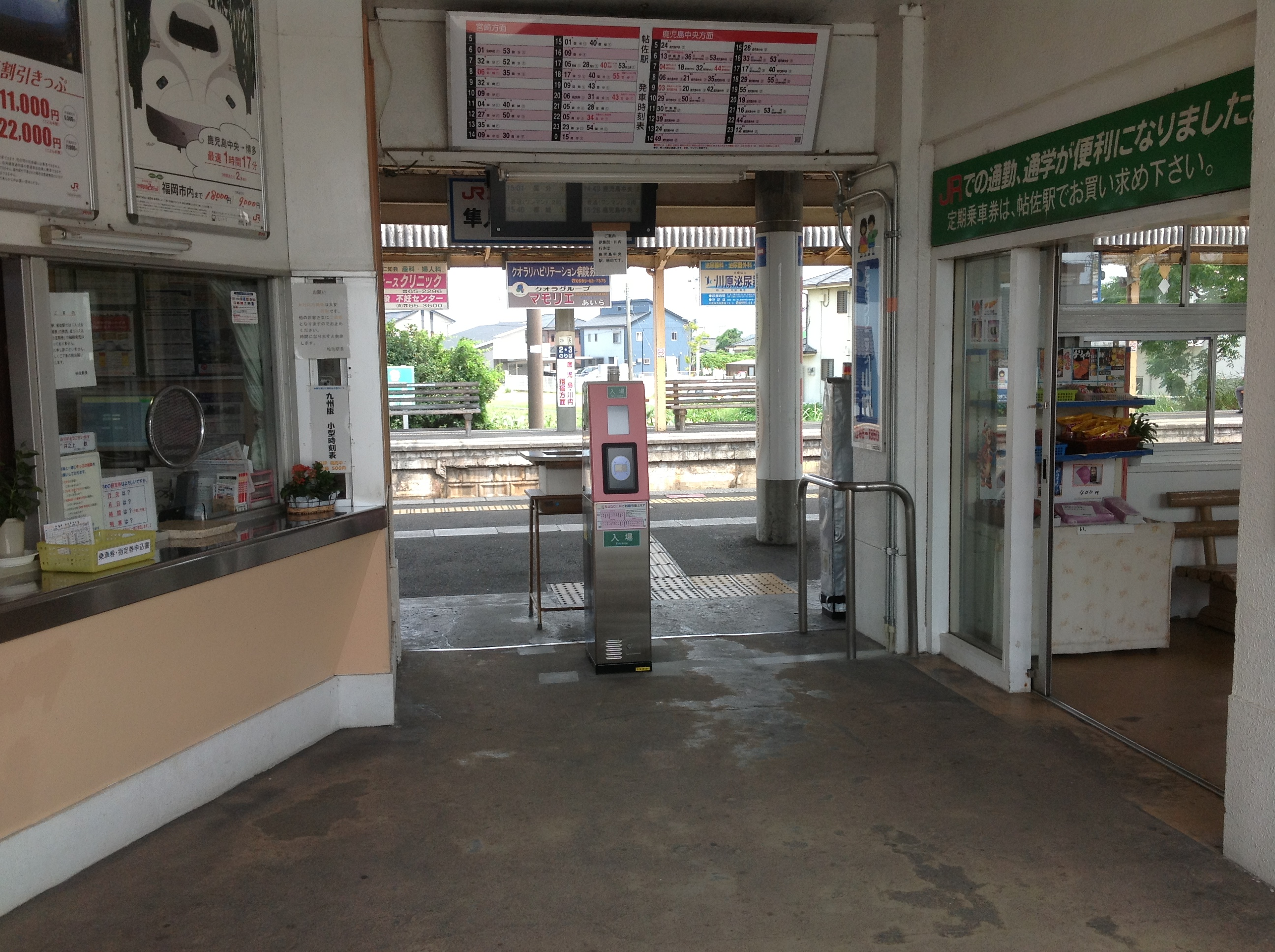
A view of the ticket gate with a SUGOCA card reader. The ticket window is to the left.

== Platforms ==
1	■ ■ Nippō Main Line	for Hayato, Miyakonojō and Miyazaki
2, 3	■ ■ Nippō Main Line	for Kagoshima and Kagoshima-Chūō

== History ==
The station was opened on 1 April 1926 by Japanese Government Railways (JGR) as an additional station on the existing track of what was then part of the route of the Kagoshima Main Line. By 1927, however, another track had been laid from Yatsushiro through Sendai down the west coast of Kyushu to Kagoshima and this was now designated as part of the Kagoshima Main Line. The route from Yatsushiro through Hayato and Chōsa to Kagoshima was then designated as the Hisatsu Line on 17 October 1927. By the end of 1932, further expansion and link ups with other networks to the east of Hayato had resulted in another line providing through-traffic from the north of Kyushu at Kokura to Kagoshima down the east coast of Kyushu. The entire stretch of this track was then redesignated as the Nippō Main Line on 6 December 1932. With the privatization of Japanese National Railways (JNR), the successor of JGR, on 1 April 1987, Chōsa came under the control of JR Kyushu.

== Passenger statistics ==
In fiscal 2022, the station was used by an average of 1,417 passengers daily (boarding passengers only), and it ranked 118th among the busiest stations of JR Kyushu.

== Nearby places ==
- Aira City Hall
- Aira City Library
- Japan National Route 10

== See also ==
- List of railway stations in Japan
