= Kajiki Station =

Railway station in Aira, Kagoshima Prefecture, Japan

Kajiki Station 加治木駅
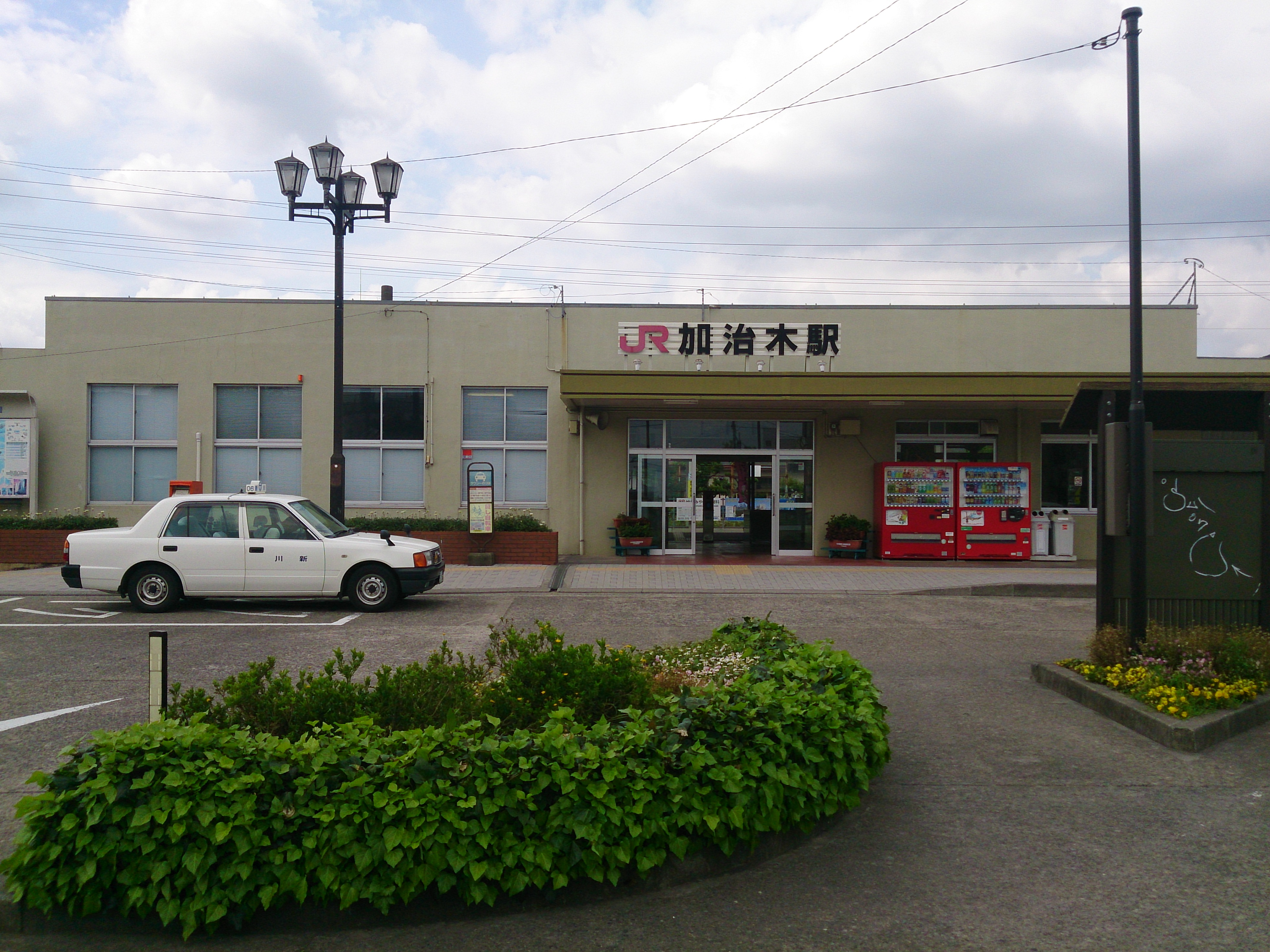
- Kajiki Station in 2013

General information
- Location: Kajiki-chō Tando, Aira-shi, Kagoshima-ken 899-5231; Japan
- Coordinates: 31°44′21″N 130°40′14″E
- Operator: JR Kyushu
- Line: ■ Nippō Main Line
- Distance: 441.6 kilometres (274.4 mi) from Kokura
- Platforms: 2 side platforms
- Tracks: 2

Construction
- Structure type: At grade
- Parking: Available at forecourt
- Accessible: No - platforms linked by footbridge

Other information
- Status: Staffed ticket window (Midori no Madoguchi) (outsourced)
- Website: Official website

History
- Opened: 10 June 1901

Passengers
- FY2022: 1615 daily
- Rank: 98th (JR Kyushu)

Services
Preceding station	JR Kyushu	Following station
Kinkō towards Kagoshima	Nippō Main Line	Hayato towards Kokura
Location
- Location within Kagoshima Prefecture Location within Japan

Kajiki Station (加治木駅, Kajiki-eki) is a passenger railway station located in the city of Aira, Kagoshima, Japan. It is operated by JR Kyushu and is on the Nippō Main Line.

== Lines ==
The station is served by the Nippō Main Line and is located 441.6 km from the starting point of the line at Kokura.

== Layout ==
The station consists of two side platforms serving two tracks at grade. The station building is a modern functional concrete structure which houses a waiting area, automatic ticket vending machines, a SUGOCA card reader and a staffed ticket window. Access to the opposite side platform is by means of a footbridge. The side platform opposite the station building is labelled platform 3 and the track, like that of platform 1, runs on the north side. A gap exists between platform 3 and 1, suggesting that there was once a platform/track 2 which has since been removed.

Management of the passenger facilities at the station has been outsourced to the JR Kyushu Tetsudou Eigyou Co., a wholly owned subsidiary of JR Kyushu specialising in station services. It staffs the ticket booth which is equipped with a Midori no Madoguchi facility.

== Platforms ==
1	■ ■ Nippō Main Line	for Kagoshima
3	■ ■ Nippō Main Line	for Miyakonojō and Miyazaki

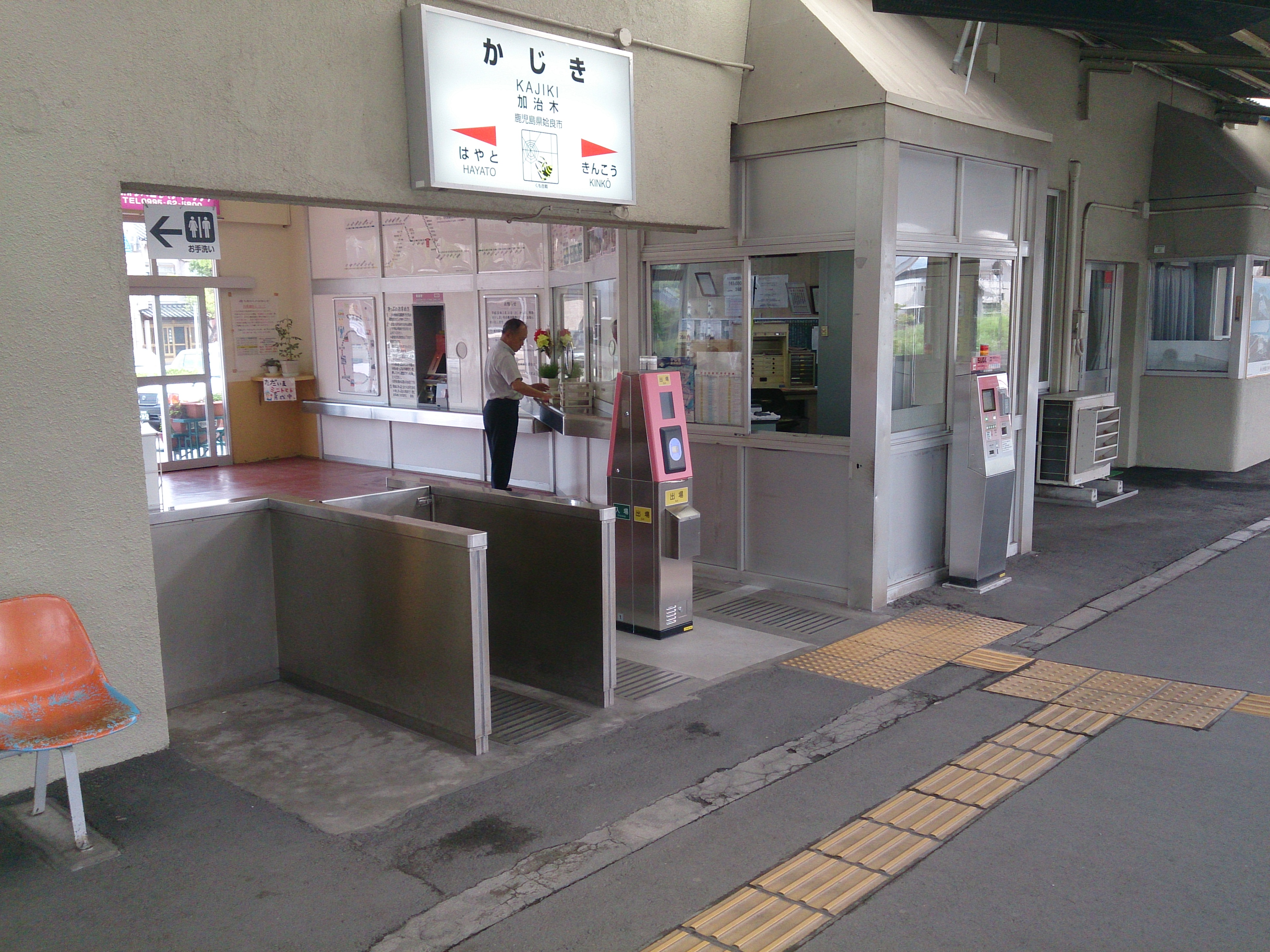
A view of the ticket gate with a SUGOCA card reader.

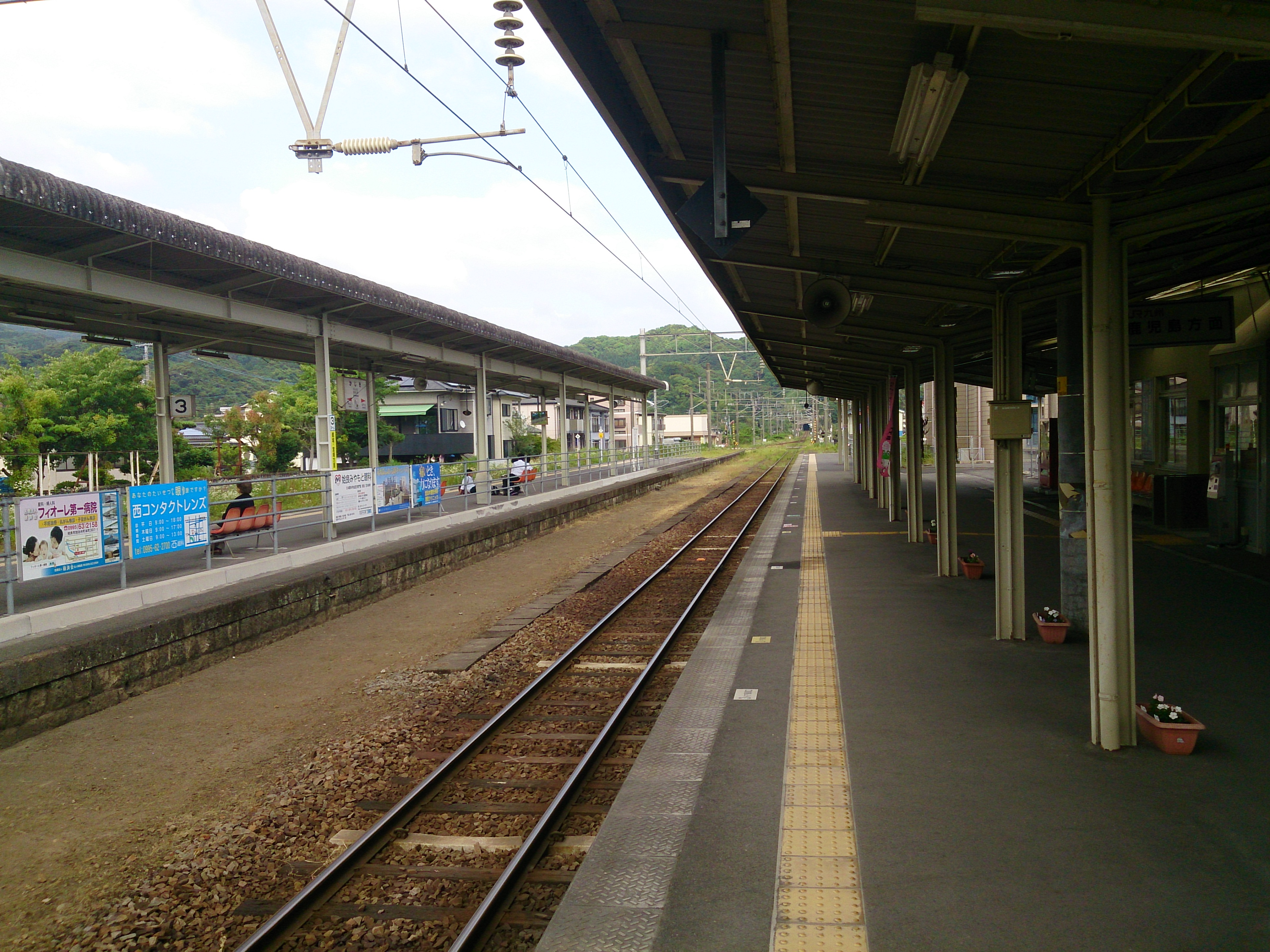
A view of the platforms. Note the second platform, to the extreme left, is labeled platform 3.

== History ==
On 10 June 1901, Japanese Government Railways (JGR) opened the then Kagoshima Line from Kagoshima to Kokubu (now Hayato). On the same day, Kajiki was opened as one of several intermediate stations along the track. By 1909, the Kagoshima Line had linked up with the Hitoyoshi line reaching south from Yatsushiro. Through traffic was achieved between Mojikō in the north of Kyushu to Kagoshima in the south. The entire stretch of track from Mojikō through Kokubu and Kajiki to Kagoshima was redesignated as the Kagoshima Main Line on 21 November 1909. By 1927, another track from Yatsushiro through Sendai to Kagoshima had been built and this was now designated as part of the Kagoshima Main Line. Kajiki, with the other stations on the older route then became part of the Hisatsu Line on 17 October 1927. By the end of 1932, further expansion and link ups with other networks to the east of Kokubu resulted in another line providing through-traffic to the north of Kyushu, from Kokura to Kagoshima. The entire stretch of track down the east coast of Kyushu from Kokura through Kajiki to Kagoshima then redesignated as the Nippō Main Line on 6 December 1932. With the privatization of Japanese National Railways (JNR), the successor of JGR, on 1 April 1987, the station came under the control of JR Kyushu.

== Passenger statistics ==
In fiscal 2022, the station was used by an average of 1,615 passengers daily (boarding passengers only), and it ranked 98th among the busiest stations of JR Kyushu.

== Surrounding area ==
- Aira City Hall Kajiki Branch
- Kajiki Post office
- Kajiki High School
- Kajiki Technical High School
- Dajo Elementary School

== See also ==
- List of railway stations in Japan
