= Kamō, Kagoshima =

Former town in Aira District, Kagoshima Prefecture, Japan

Coordinates: 31°46′36″N 130°32′57″E

The location of Kamo in Kagoshima Prefecture

Kamō (蒲生町, Kamō-chō) was a town located in Aira District, Kagoshima Prefecture, Japan.

As of 2003, the town had an estimated population of 7,311 and the density of 89.94 persons per km^{2}. The total area was 81.29 km^{2}.

On March 23, 2010, Kamō, along with the towns of Aira (former) and Kajiki (all from Aira District), was merged to create the city of Aira. Aira District will be left with one municipality.

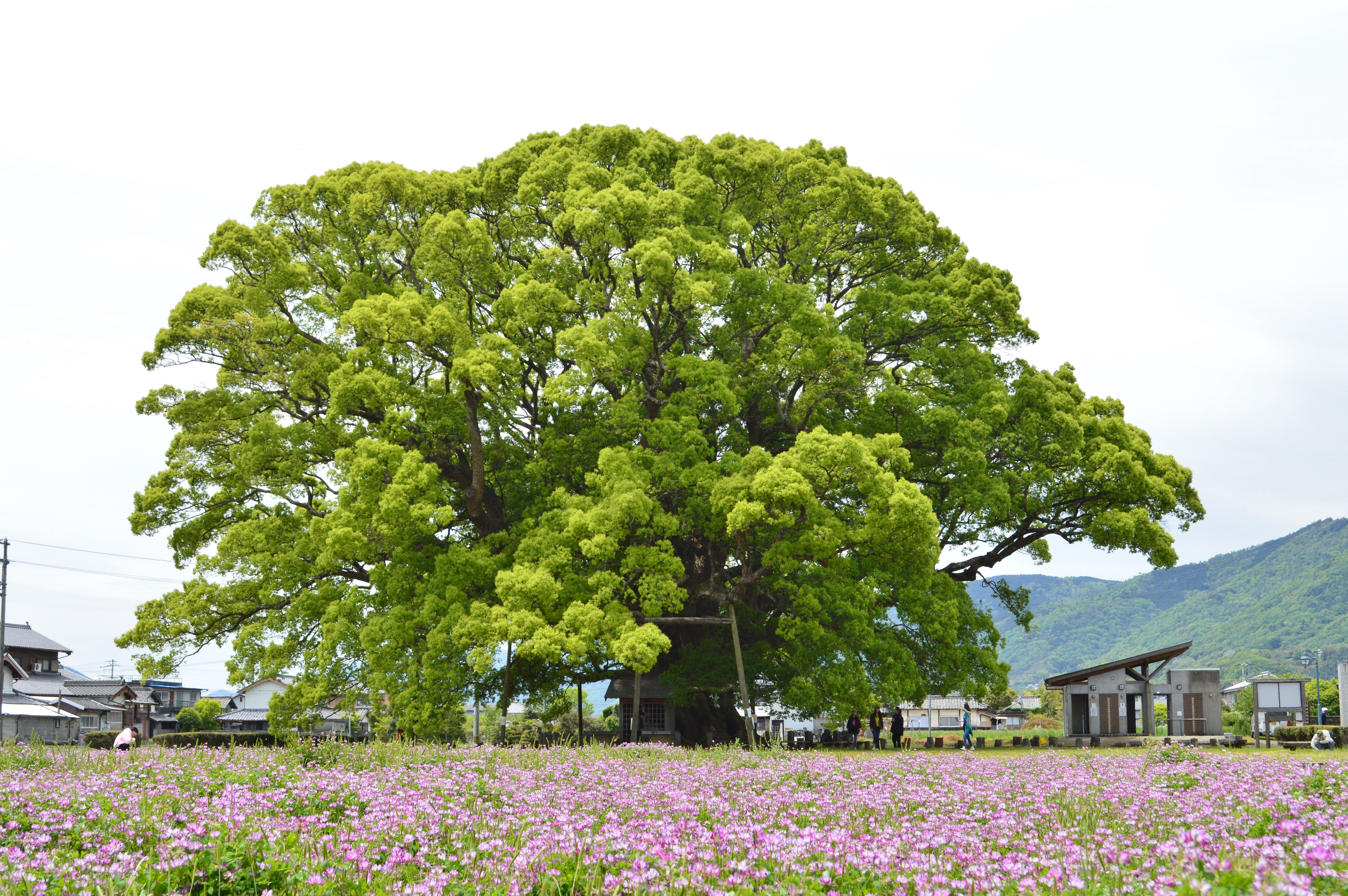
Ōkusu at Kamō

Kamō is home to the oldest Camphor laurel tree (Cinnamomum camphora) in Japan. The tree is approximately 1500 years old, and stretches 33.6 m (110 ft) across, and about 30 m (98 ft) high. It was heavily damaged in typhoons in 1997 and 2004. A large hollow, with a diameter of 4.5 m (15 ft), exists inside the tree. This hollow was a favourite resting place for homeless men in Kagoshima until a locked door was installed in April 2000.

The tree, fondly referred to as Ōkusu (大楠, great camphor) by locals, is located on the grounds of Hachiman Jinja, a shinto shrine.

Every November an autumn festival called Donto Matsuri takes place on the grounds of Hachiman Jinja.

== Geography ==
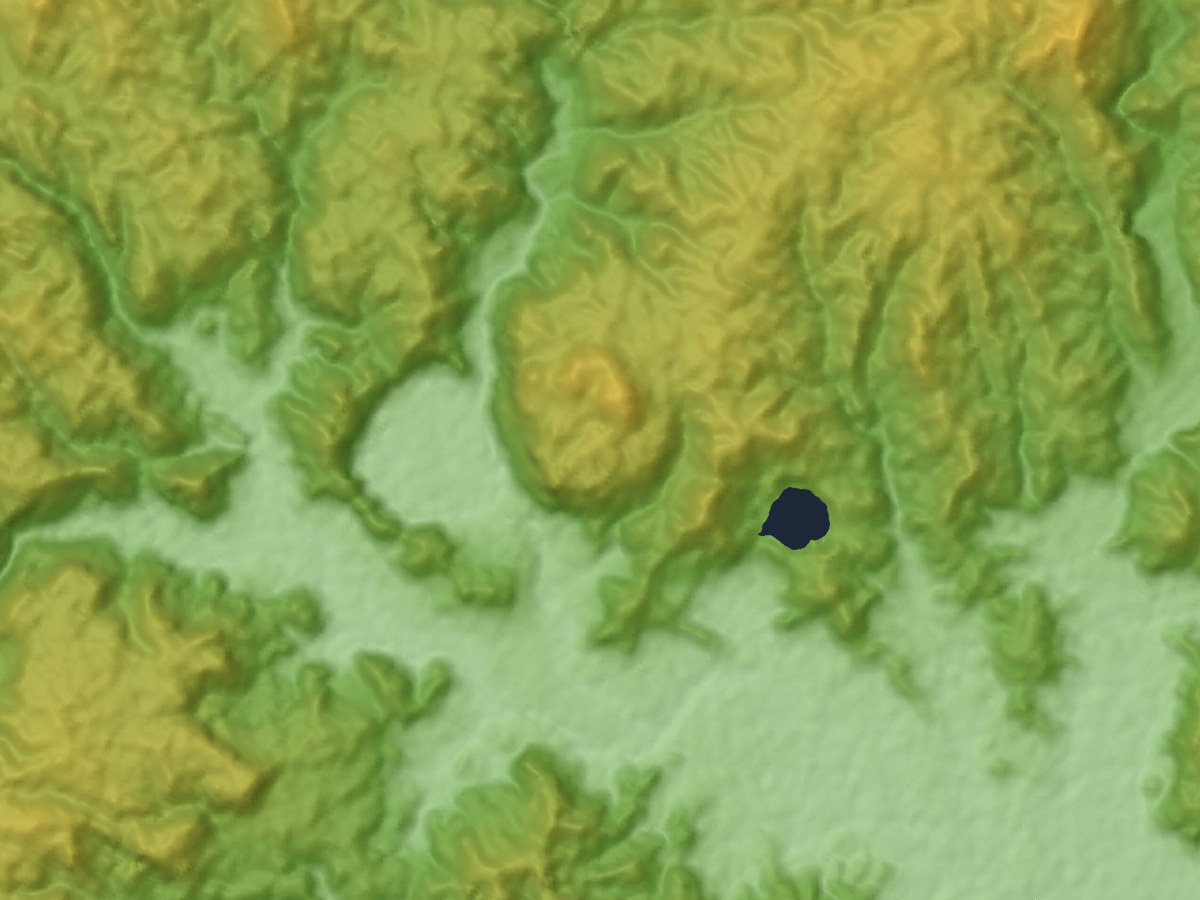
Relief map centred on Kamō. Aojiki volcano is the high relief in centre, Yonemaru maar is to its west, with Sumiyoshi pond to its east.

The former town is in a valley drained by the Gamou river which flows to the south-east through the conurbation of Aira and into the north-western portion of Kagoshima Bay. To the north are the heights of the Aojiki volcano and hot springs near the plain of Yonemaru. The lake of Sumiyoshiike (Sumiyoshi pond) is to the former town's north-east which is north-west of the centre of the Aira conurbation.

=== Geology ===
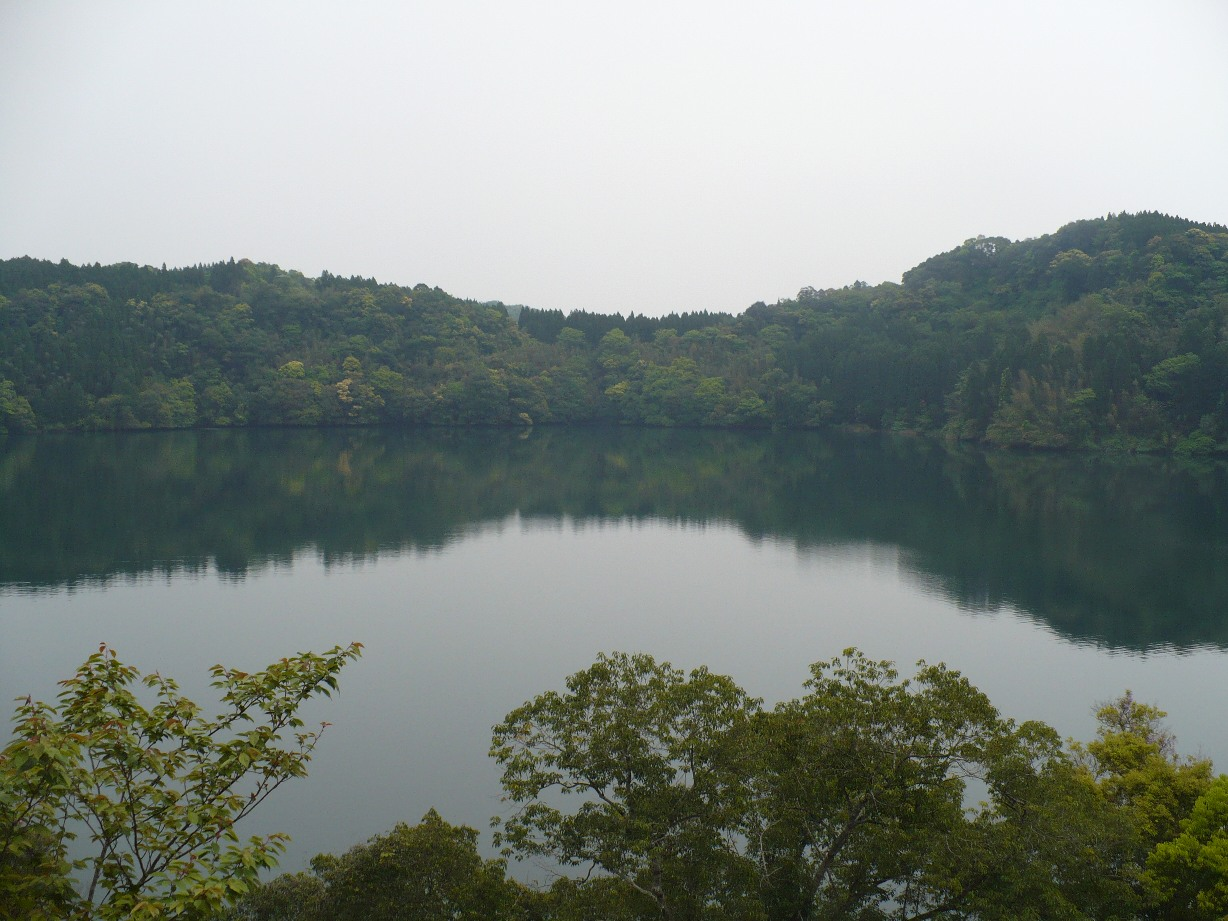
Sumiyoshi pond maar, Aira city, Kagoshima prefecture, Japan

To the north of the town/suburb is the basaltic Kamo monogenetic volcanic field with the two maars of Yonemaru and Sumiyoshiike as well as the volcanic hill of Aojiki. The volcanic vents are north-west of the Aira Caldera.
