= Sengan-en Station =

Railway station in Kagoshima, Kagoshima Prefecture, Japan

Sengan-en Station 仙厳園駅
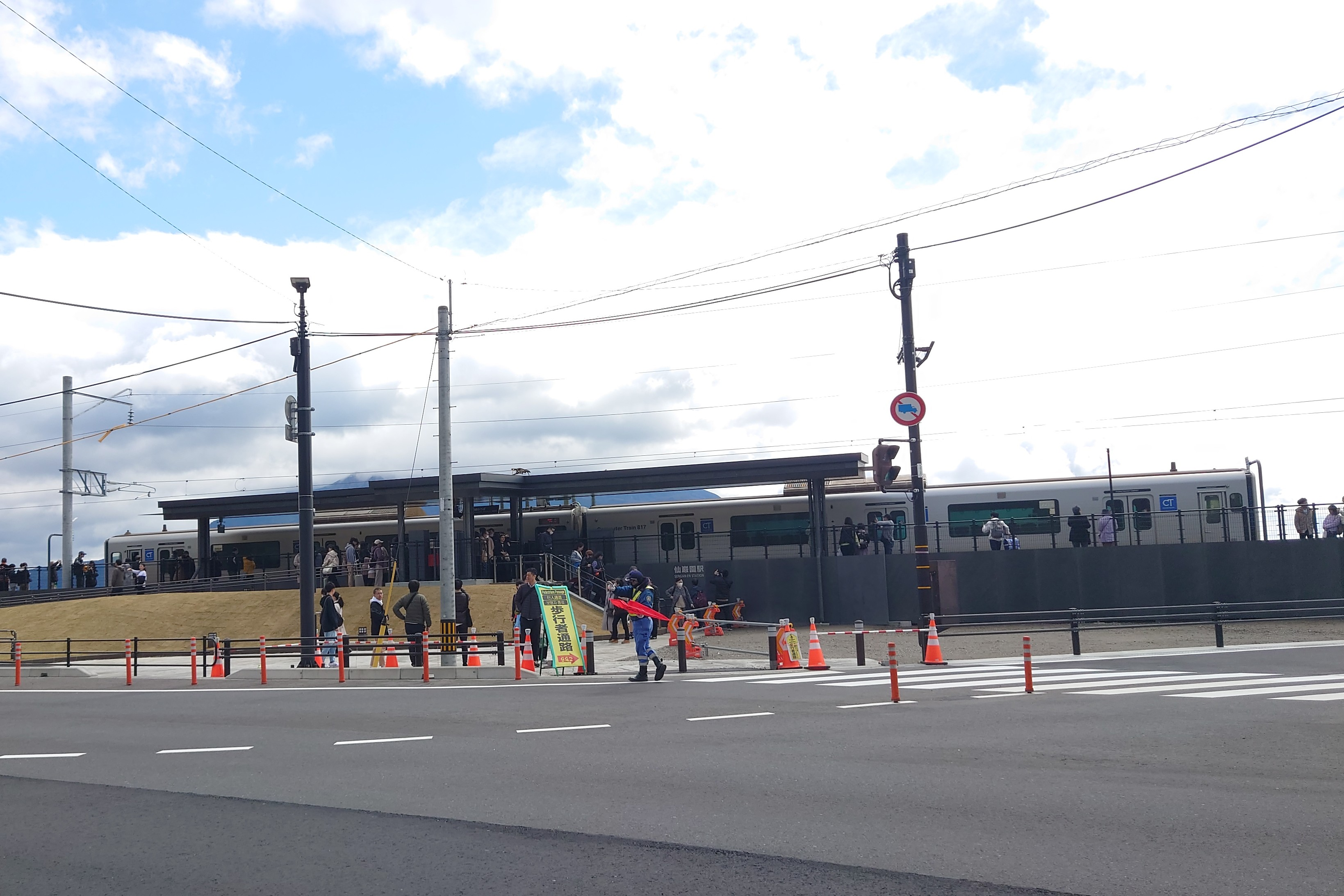
- Sengan-en Station in 2025

General information
- Location: Yoshino-chō, Kagoshima-shi, Kagoshima-ken 9698-5; Japan
- Coordinates: 31°36′59.80″N 130°34′34.61″E
- Operator: JR Kyushu
- Line: ■ Nippō Main Line
- Distance: 460.5 kilometres (286.1 mi) from Kokura
- Platforms: 1 side platform

Other information
- Status: Unstaffed
- Website: Official website

History
- Opened: 15 March 2025

Services
Preceding station	JR Kyushu	Following station
Kagoshima Terminus	Nippō Main Line	Ryūgamizu towards Kokura
Location
- Location within Kagoshima Prefecture Location within Japan

Sengan-en Station (仙厳園駅, Sengan-en-eki) is a passenger railway station located in the city of Kagoshima, Kagoshima, Japan. It is operated by JR Kyushu and is on the Nippō Main Line. It is named after the nearby Sengan-en garden, which is designated as a UNESCO World Heritage Site.

== History ==
A council established by the city of Kagoshima in 2017 considered the possibility of a new station on the Iso district, which had a number of tourism spots such as the Sengan-en. On 28 November 2018, the opening of the new station between Kagoshima Station and Ryūgamizu Station on the Nippō Main Line was deemed possible by the council, with the condition that the new station does not damage the value of the surrounding spots. The placeholder name for the station was Iso New Station (磯新駅, Iso Shin-eki; "Iso New Station"). The current name was announced on 27 March 2024. The construction of the station was requested to the governor of the Kagoshima Prefecture on 19 December 2019. The opening of the station was planned to be in 2024. The construction cost of the station was mostly paid by private companies, although the prefecture and the city also paid some part. Sengan-en Station opened on 15 March 2025.

== See also ==
- List of railway stations in Japan
