= Ryūgamizu Station =

Railway station in Kagoshima, Kagoshima Prefecture, Japan

Ryūgamizu Station 竜ヶ水駅
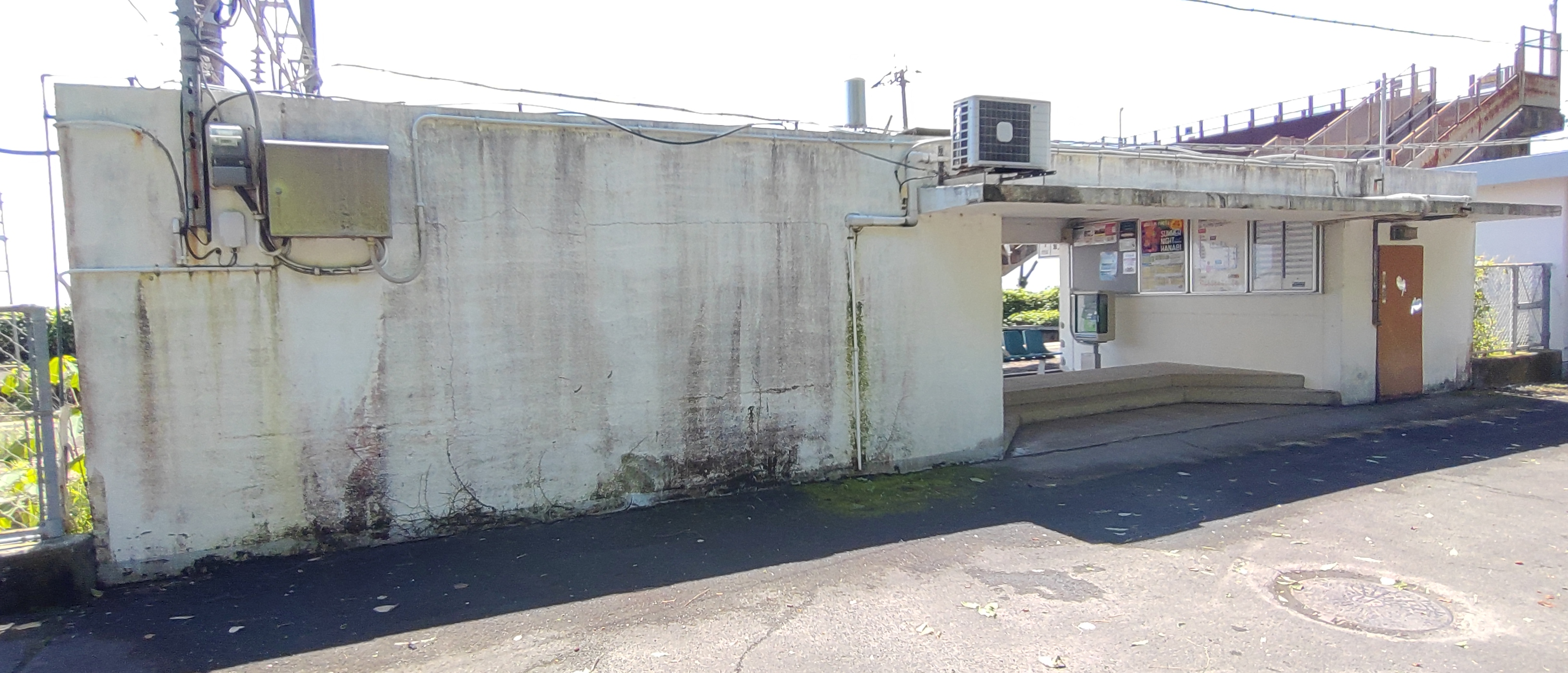
- Ryūgamizu Station (August 2023)

General information
- Location: Yoshino-chō, Kagoshima-shi, Kagoshima-ken 892-0871; Japan
- Coordinates: 31°38′50.53″N 130°36′14.68″E
- Operator: JR Kyushu
- Line: ■ Nippō Main Line
- Distance: 455.7 kilometres (283.2 mi) from Kokura
- Platforms: 2 side platforms

Other information
- Status: Unstaffed
- Website: Official website

History
- Opened: 7 August 1915

Passengers
- FY2015: 4 daily

Services
Preceding station	JR Kyushu	Following station
Sengan-en towards Kagoshima	Nippō Main Line	Shigetomi towards Kokura
Location
- Location within Kagoshima Prefecture Location within Japan

Ryūgamizu Station (竜ヶ水駅, Ryūgamizu-eki) is a passenger railway station located in the city of Kagoshima, Kagoshima, Japan. It is operated by JR Kyushu and is on the Nippō Main Line.

== Lines ==
The station is served by the Nippō Main Line and is located 455.7 km from the starting point of the line at Kokura.

== Layout ==
The station consists of two side platforms serving two tracks at grade, connected to the station building by a footbridge. It is unattended.

== Platforms ==
1	■ Nippō Main Line	for Hayato, Miyakonojō and Miyazaki
2	■ Nippō Main Line	for Kagoshima and Kagoshima-Chūō

== History ==
The station was opened by the Japanese Government Railways (JGR) on 7 August 1915. With the privatization of Japanese National Railways (JNR), the successor of JGR, on 1 April 1987, the station came under the control of JR Kyushu.

== Passenger statistics ==
In fiscal 2015, the station was used by an average of 4 passengers daily (boarding passengers only).

== Surrounding area ==
The area around the station is surrounded by the mountains and the coastline of Kinko Bay, and there is no flat land. There are several gas stations and restaurants under the tracks, and it is a rest stop on Japan National Route 10, which runs parallel to the Nippō Main Line. Most of the residents of the former Ryugasui village were relocated due to a heavy rain disaster, and now there are only a few houses scattered around the area, with almost no residents still living there.

== See also ==
- List of railway stations in Japan
