= Kajiki, Kagoshima =

Dissolved municipality in Kagoshima prefecture, Japan

Coordinates: 31°45′30″N 130°39′42″E

The location of Kajiki in Kagoshima Prefecture.

Kajiki (加治木町, Kajiki-chō) is a town located in Aira District, Kagoshima Prefecture, Japan. It is located north of the city of Kagoshima. Kajiki is located on the northern part of the bay. Kagoshima Airport is to the north.

== History ==
Kajiki is located on a small valley and a plain. The mountains dominate the north and west.

It is accessible via the Kyūshū Expressway at Interchange 25-1, which also connects to another freeway heading east. The interchange was opened on December 13, 1973, and was extended north to Mizobe-Kagoshima Airport on November 29, 1976. On March 25, 1992, a section was opened, which became the East Kyūshū Expressway on December 19, 2001, when the connection was completed.

On March 23, 2010, Kajiki, along with the towns of Aira (former) and Kamō (all from Aira District), was merged to create the city of Aira. Aira District will be left with one municipality.

== Amenities ==
Kajiki has elementary schools, middle schools, and high schools, including Kajiki High School (Kajiki Kōkō), one of the top 5 academic schools of Kagoshima.

Kajiki's main station is Kajiki train station, with a view of Sakurajima.

There is also a post office, parks and banks.

A river runs slightly west of Kajiki. In the spring time, the park that runs along the river is a popular place for locals to enjoy Hanami (flower watching) and barbecues.

Kajiki is well known, in Kagoshima prefecture and even some places outside of Kagoshima, for its Kajiki manju. Kajiki manju is rice dough filled with sweet red bean paste (anko).

Two interesting points to see in Kajiki are Ryumon Falls and a preserved section of a path Saigō Takamori and his men used to walk to Tokyo from Kagoshima. This path has been used in NHK TV programs.

== Population ==
As of 2003, the town had an estimated population of 23,364 and the density of 491.87 persons per km^{2}. The total area was 47.50 km^{2}.
