= Aira, Kagoshima (Aira District) =

Dissolved municipality in Kagoshima prefecture, Japan

Coordinates: 31°45′19″N 130°36′42″E

The location of Aira in Kagoshima Prefecture.

Aira (姶良町, Aira-cho) was a town located in Aira District, Kagoshima Prefecture, Japan. It was located west of Kajiki and north of Kagoshima.

On March 23, 2010, Aira absorbed the towns of Kajiki and Kamō (all from Aira District) to create the city of Aira. Aira District will be left with one municipality.

As of 2003, the town had an estimated population of 44,029 and the density of 429.47 persons per km^{2}. The total area was 102.52 km^{2}.
