= Kagoshima Station =

Railway station in Kagoshima, Kagoshima Prefecture, Japan

Kagoshima Station 鹿児島駅
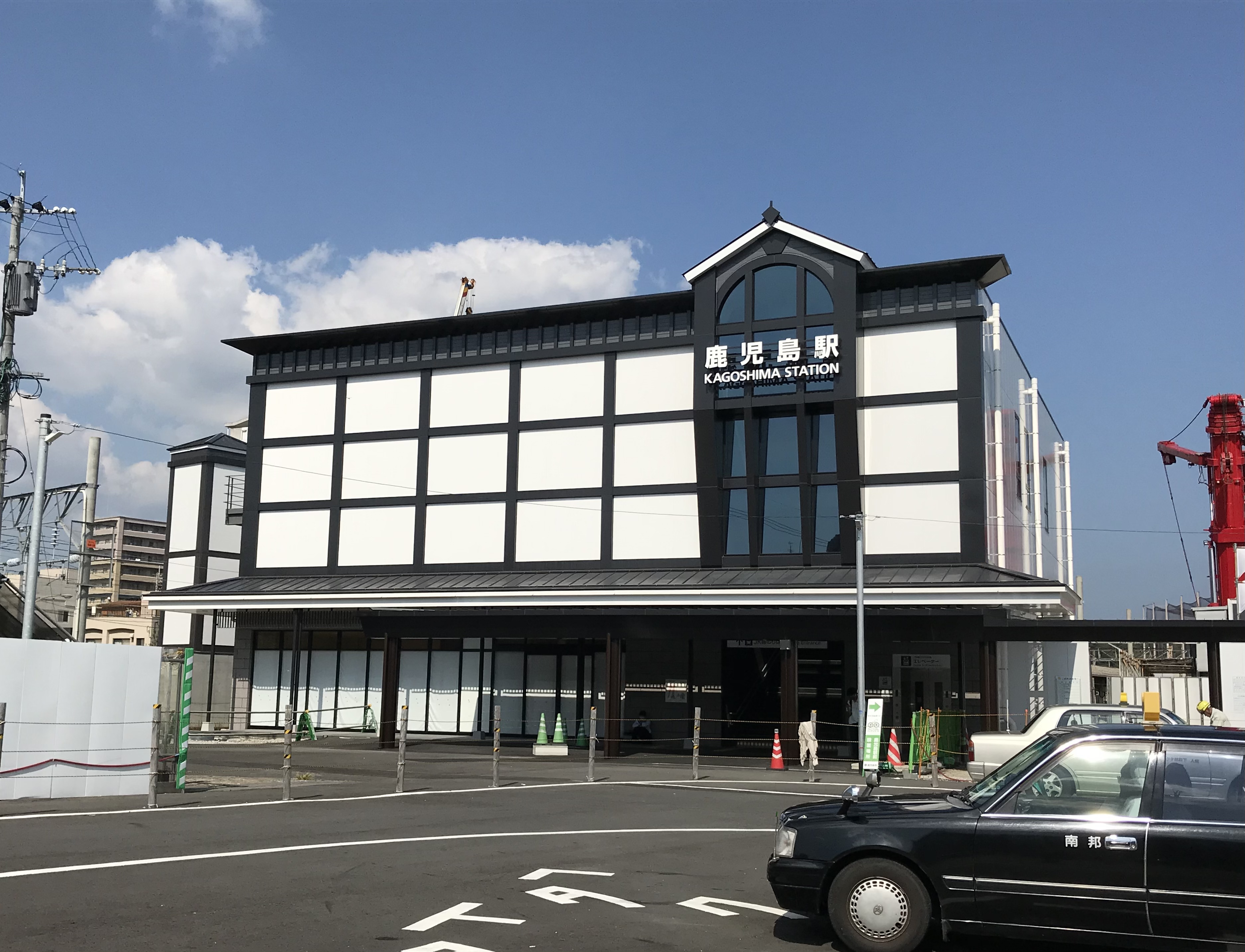
- Kagoshima Station in 2020

General information
- Location: 810 Hamamachi, Kagoshima-shi, Kagoshima-ken 892-0812; Japan
- Coordinates: 31°36′5.39″N 130°33′47.21″E
- Operator: JR Kyushu
- Line: ■ Nippō Main Line
- Distance: 389.5 kilometres (242.0 mi) from Kokura
- Platforms: 2 island platforms

Other information
- Status: Staffed (Midori no Madoguchi)
- Website: Official website

History
- Opened: 10 June 1901

Passengers
- FY2020: 1330 daily

Services
| Preceding station | JR Kyushu | Following station |
|---|---|---|
| Terminus | Kagoshima Main Line | Kagoshima-Chūō towards Mojikō |
| Terminus | Nippō Main Line | Sengan-en towards Kokura |
Location
- Location within Kagoshima Prefecture Location within Japan

Kagoshima Station (鹿児島駅, Kagoshima-eki) is a passenger railway station located in the city of Kagoshima, Kagoshima, Japan. It is operated by JR Kyushu.

== Lines ==
Kagoshima Station is the notional southern terminus of the Kyushu Railway Company's Kagoshima and Nippo Main Lines, although services on both lines in fact start and terminate at the neighboring Kagoshima-Chūō Station. The station is located 462.6 km from the starting point of the Nippō Main Line at Kokura, and 398.5 km from the starting point of the Kagoshima Main Line at Mojikō.

== Layout ==
Kagoshima Station consists of two island platforms and four tracks with an elevated station building, with the concourse on the second floor. The current station building is the fifth generation, and is barrier-free, with elevators connecting the station entrance, the ticket gate concourse, and the passageway inside the ticket gates to each platform. The station has a Midori no Madoguchi staffed ticket office.

=== JR ===
| 2 | ■ Kagoshima Main Line | for Sendai, Kagoshima-Chūō and Kushikino |
| 3 | ■ Ibusuki Makurazaki Line | for Kagoshima-Chūō and Ibusuki |
| 4 | ■ Nippo Main Line | for Hayato, Miyazaki |

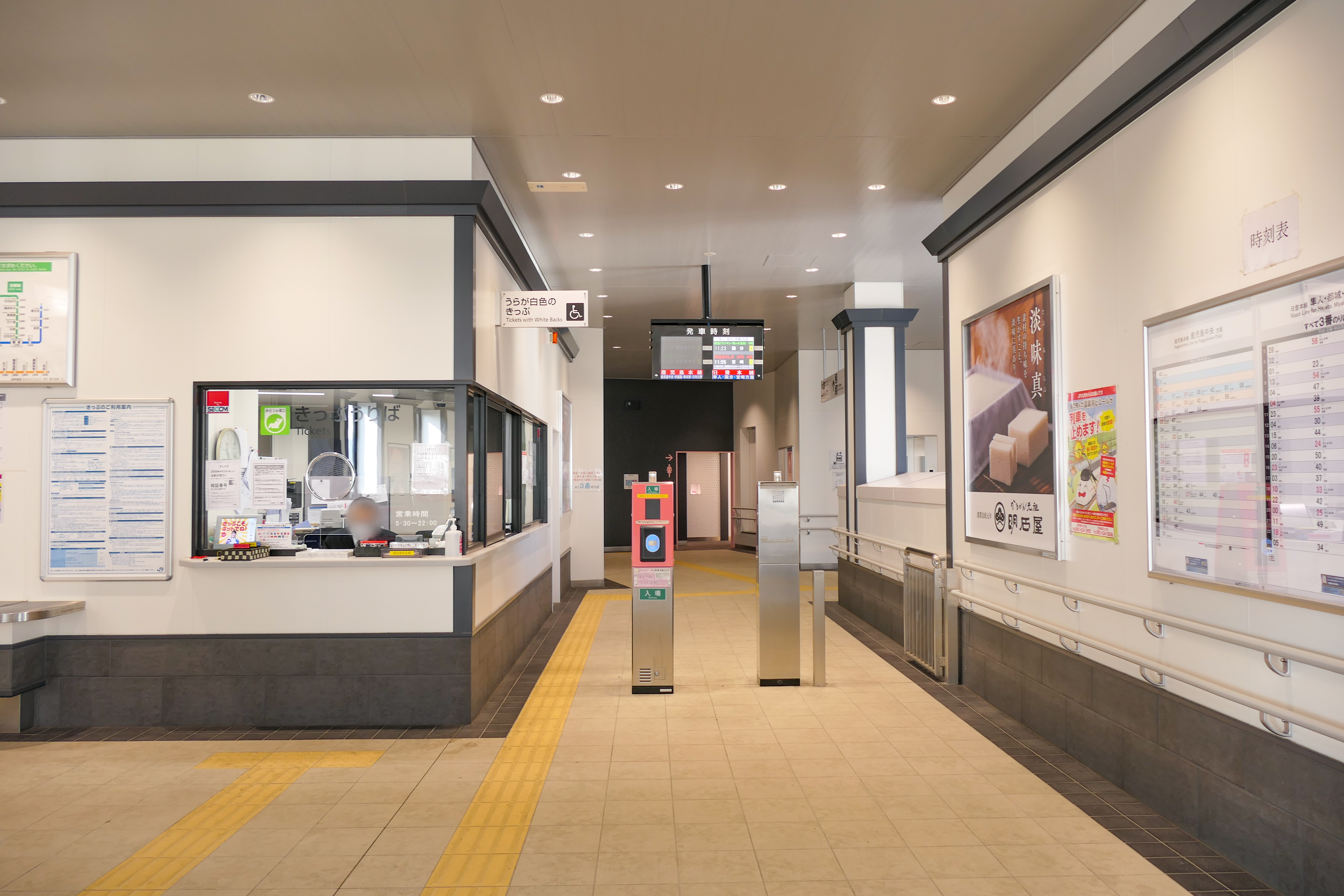
Exit Gate

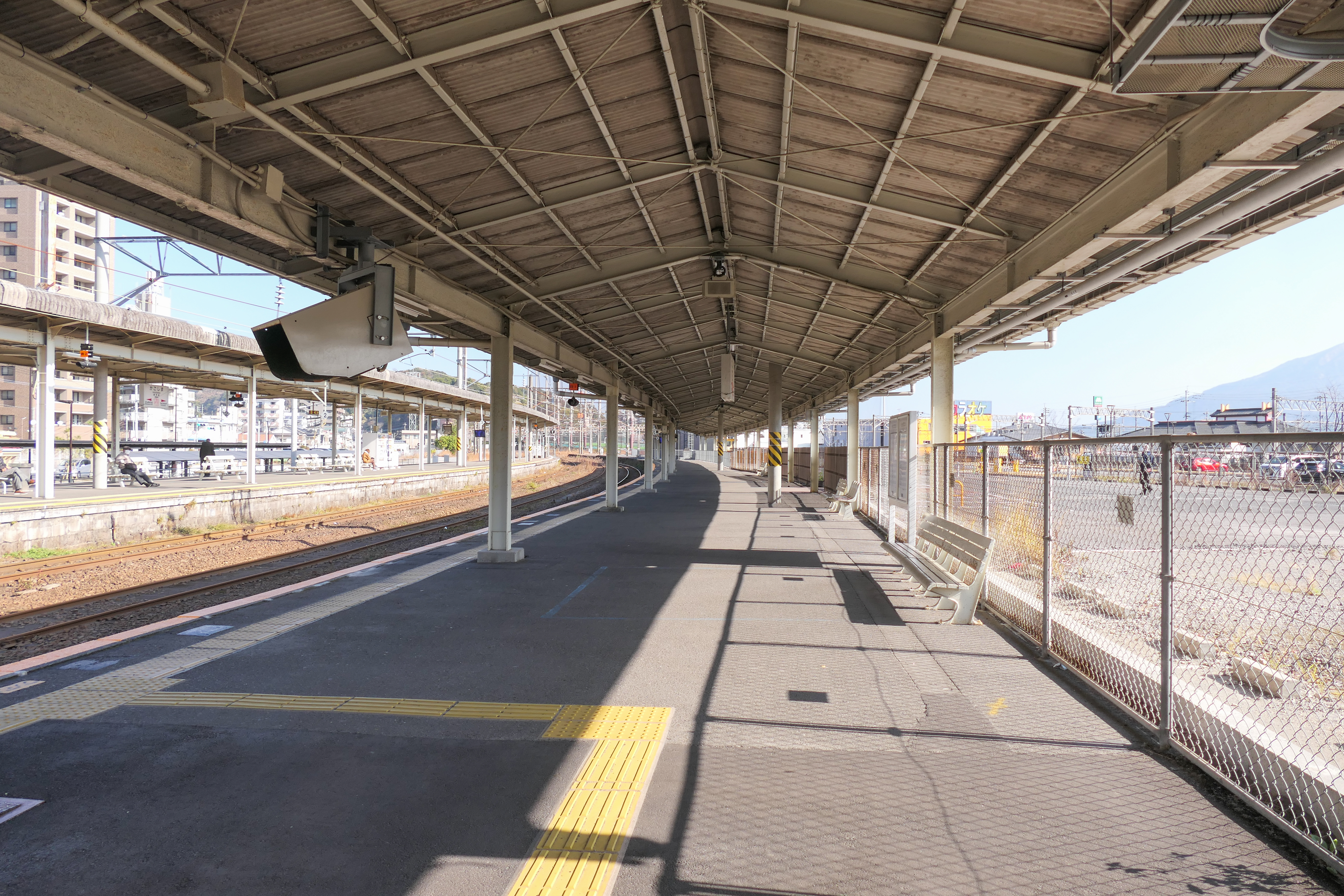
Platform 1

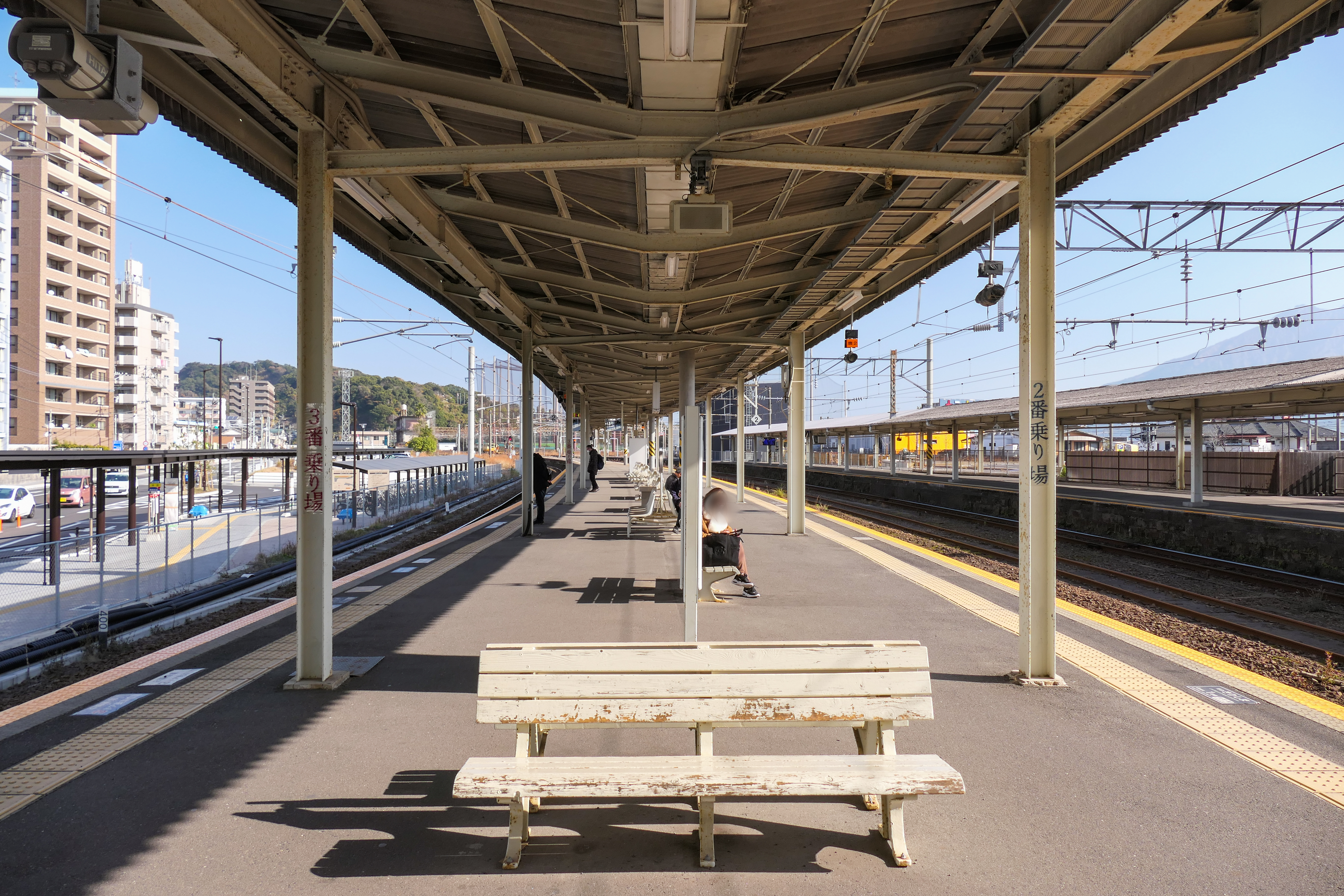
Platforms 2 and 3

== History ==
The station was opened by the Japanese Government Railways (JGR) on 10 June 1901 with the opening of the Kokubu (now Hayato)–Kagoshima section of the Kagoshima Line. On 11 October 1913, the Sendai Line opened from Kagoshima to Take (later to become Kagoshima Chuo via Nishi Kagoshima) to Higashi Ichikima. Around this time the second generation station building was completed. The Kagoshima Electric Tramway connected to the station on 20 December 1914. On 6 December 1932, the station was transferred from the Hisatsu Line to the Kagoshima Main Line and Nippo Main Line. The station was completely destroyed in the Kagoshima Air Raid of 17 June 1945. During that attack, three parked trains filled with overcrowded passengers were hit directly by several bombs and more than 420 passengers and staff were killed and more than 650 were injured. A monument to commemorate the victims was erected on the former platform 5, but following improvement work on the station building and station premises in 2020, it was moved to the end of the current platform 1. The third generation station building was completed in October 1950 and the fourth generation in September 1976. With the privatization of Japanese National Railways (JNR), the successor of JGR, on 1 April 1987, the station came under the control of JR Kyushu. The current station building was completed in February 2020.

== Passenger statistics ==
In fiscal 2020, the station was used by an average of 1330 passengers daily (boarding passengers only), and it ranked 115th among the busiest stations of JR Kyushu.

== Surrounding area ==
- Kagoshima City Nagata Junior High School
- Kagoshima City Tairyu Elementary School
- Kagoshima City Kagoshima Tamaryu Junior and Senior High School

== See also ==
- List of railway stations in Japan
