= Hyūga-Nagai Station =

Railway station in Nobeoka, Miyazaki Prefecture, Japan

Hyūga-Nagai Station 日向長井駅
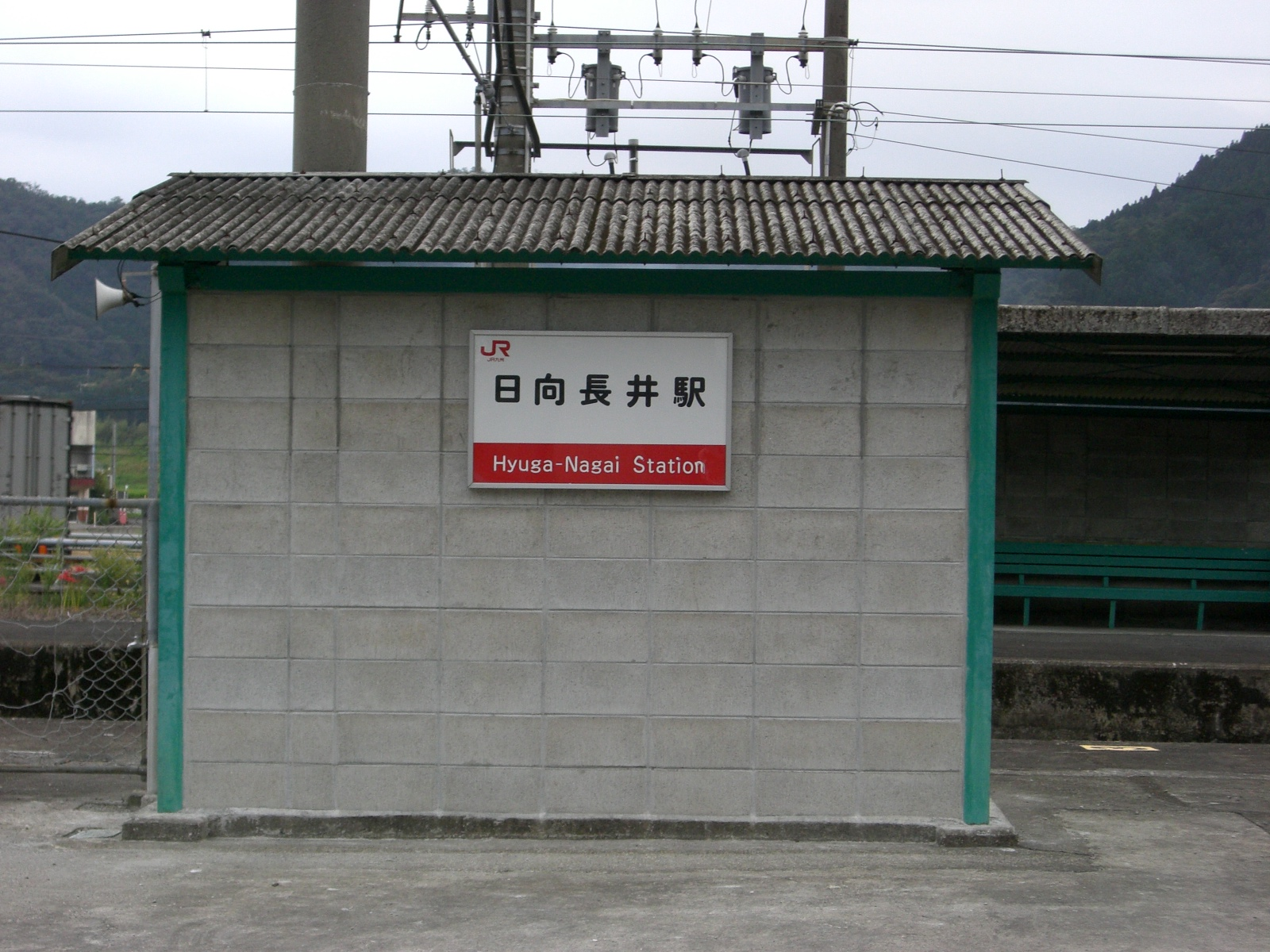
- Hyūga-Nagai Station in 2007

General information
- Location: Kitagawamachi Nagai, Nobeoka-shi, Miyazaki-ken 889-0102; Japan
- Coordinates: 32°39′51″N 131°42′00″E
- Operator: JR Kyushu
- Line: ■ Nippō Main Line
- Distance: 246.7 km from Kokura
- Platforms: 2 side platforms
- Tracks: 2 + 1 siding

Construction
- Structure type: At grade
- Accessible: No - platforms linked by footbridge

Other information
- Status: Unstaffed
- Website: Official website

History
- Opened: 22 October 1922

Passengers
- FY2016: 3 daily

Services
| Preceding station | JR Kyushu | Following station |
|---|---|---|
| Kita-Nobeoka towards Kagoshima | Nippō Main Line | Kitagawa towards Kokura |
Location
- Location within Miyazaki Prefecture Location within Japan

Hyūga-Nagai Station (日向長井駅, Hyūga-Nagai-eki) is a passenger railway station in the city of Nobeoka, Miyazaki, Japan. It is operated by JR Kyushu and is on the Nippō Main Line.

== Lines ==
The station is served by the Nippō Main Line and is located 246.7 km from the starting point of the line at Kokura. Only local trains stop at this station.

== Layout ==
The station consists of two side platforms serving two tracks at grade with a siding branching off track 2. There is no station building but both platforms have weather shelters for waiting passengers. Access to the opposite side platform is by a footbridge.

== History ==
In 1913, the Miyazaki Prefectural Railway (宮崎県営鉄道) opened a line from Miyazaki northwards to Hirose (now closed). After the Miyazaki Prefectural Railway was nationalized on 21 September 1917, Japanese Government Railways (JGR) undertook the subsequent extension of the track which it designated as the Miyazaki Main Line. Expanding the north in phases, the track reached Hyūga-Nagai which was established as the northern terminus on 29 October 1922. It became a through-station on 1 July 1923 when the track was extended to Ichitana. At the same time, JGR had been expanding its Hoshū Line south from Kokura down the east coast of Kyushu, reaching its southern terminus of Shigeoka just 9 km north of Ichitana by March 1922. The link up between the two lines was achieved on 15 December 1923, and through traffic was thus established from Kokura through Hyūga-Nagai to Miyakonojō. The entire stretch of track was then renamed the Nippō Main Line. Freight operations were abolished in 1962 and baggage handling in 1972 at which time the station became unstaffed. With the privatization of Japanese National Railways (JNR), the successor of JGR, on 1 April 1987, the station came under the control of JR Kyushu.

== Passenger statistics ==
In fiscal 2016, the station was used by an average of 3 passengers (boarding only) per day.

== Surrounding area ==
- Japan National Route 10

== See also ==
- List of railway stations in Japan
