= Tano Station (Miyazaki) =

Railway station in Miyazaki, Miyazaki Prefecture, Japan

Tano Station 田野駅
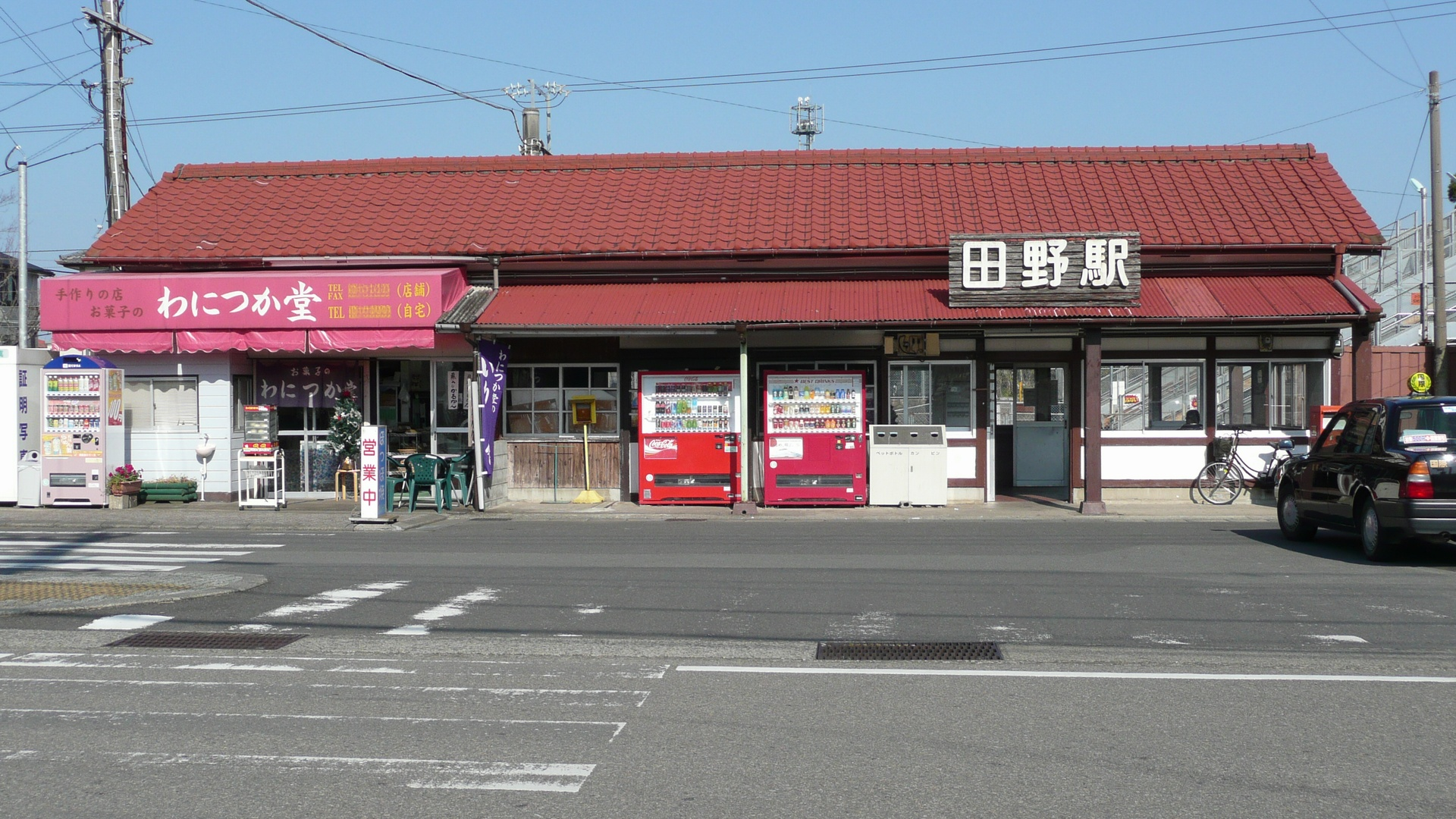
- Tano Station in 2007

General information
- Location: Tanocho, Miyazaki-shi, Miyazaki-ken, 889-1701; Japan
- Coordinates: 31°50′16″N 131°18′17″E
- Operator: JR Kyushu
- Line: ■ Nippō Main Line
- Distance: 358.0 km from Kokura
- Platforms: 1 side + 1 island platform
- Tracks: 3

Construction
- Structure type: At grade
- Accessible: No - island platform accessed by footbridge

Other information
- Status: Unstaffed
- Website: Official website

History
- Opened: 25 October 1916

Passengers
- FY2016: 14 daily

Services
Preceding station	JR Kyushu	Following station
Hyūga-Kutsukake towards Kagoshima	Nippō Main Line	Aoidake towards Kokura
Location
- Location within Miyazaki Prefecture Location within Japan

Tano Station (田野駅, Tano-eki) is a passenger railway station in Miyazaki City, Miyazaki Prefecture, Japan. It is operated by JR Kyushu and is on the Nippō Main Line.

== Lines ==
The station is served by the Nippō Main Line and is located 358.0 km from the starting point of the line at Kokura.

== Layout ==
The station, which is unstaffed, consists of a side platform and an island platform serving two tracks. The station building is timber structure of traditional Japanese design with a double tiled roof. Half of the building houses a cafe while the other half has a houses a waiting area and an automatic ticket vending machine. Access to the island platform is by means of a footbridge.

=== Platforms ===
1, 2	■ ■ Nippō Main Line	for Miyakonojō and Kagoshima-Chūō
1, 3	■ ■ Nippō Main Line	for Minami-Miyazaki and Miyazaki

== History ==
Japanese Government Railways (JGR) had opened the Miyazaki Line from Yoshimatsu to Miyakonojō on 8 October 1913. The track was extended east in phases, with Aoidake opening as the new terminus on 21 March 1916. On 25 October 1916, Aoidake linked up with a track from Miyazaki at Kiyotake. On the same day, Tano was opened as an intermediate station on this new stretch. The line was renamed the Miyazaki Main Line on 21 September 1917. By 1923, the track from Miyazaki had reached north to link up with the track of the Nippō Main Line at Shigeoka. On 15 December 1923, the entire stretch of track from Shigeoka through Miyazaki to Yoshimatsu, including Tano, was designated as part of the Nippō Main Line. Freight operations were discontinued in 1971 and baggahe handling in 1985, after which the station was unattended. With the privatization of Japanese National Railways (JNR), the successor of JGR, on 1 April 1987, the station came under the control of JR Kyushu.

== Passenger statistics ==
In fiscal 2016, the station was used by an average of 600 passengers daily (boarding passengers only), and it ranked 225th among the busiest stations of JR Kyushu.

== Surrounding area ==
- Miyazaki City Hall Tano General Branch (Former Tano Town Hall)
- Miyazaki City Tano Elementary School
- Miyazaki City Tano Junior High School

== See also ==
- List of railway stations in Japan
