= Kiyotake Station =

Railway station in Miyazaki, Miyazaki Prefecture, Japan

Kiyotake Station 田野駅
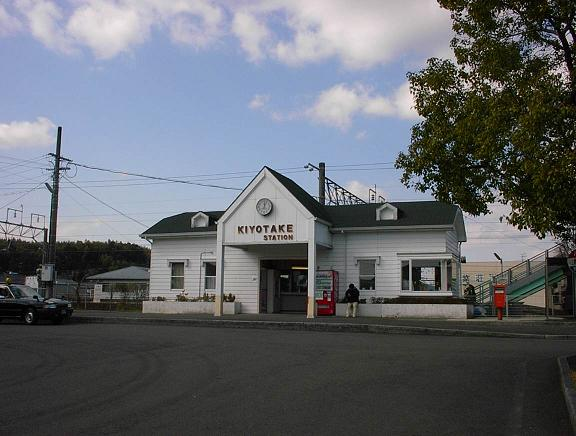
- Kiyotake Station in 2006

General information
- Location: Funahiki Kiyotakecho, Miyazaki-shi, Miyazaki-ken 889-1604; Japan
- Coordinates: 31°51′34″N 131°23′21″E
- Operator: JR Kyushu
- Line: ■ Nippō Main Line
- Distance: 347.8 km from Kokura
- Platforms: 1 island platform
- Tracks: 2 + 1 siding

Construction
- Structure type: At grade
- Accessible: No - island platform accessed by footbridge

Other information
- Website: Official website

History
- Opened: 20 March 1915

Passengers
- FY2016: 520 daily
- Rank: 243rd (among JR Kyushu stations)

Services
Preceding station	JR Kyushu	Following station
Kanō towards Kagoshima	Nippō Main Line	Hyūga-Kutsukake towards Kokura
Location
- Location within Miyazaki Prefecture Location within Japan

Kiyotake Station (清武駅, Kiyotake-eki) is a passenger railway station located in Miyazaki City, Miyazaki Prefecture, Japan. It is operated by JR Kyushu and is on the Nippō Main Line.

== Lines ==
The station is served by the Nippō Main Line and is located 347.8 km from the starting point of the line at Kokura.

== Layout ==
The station consists of an island platform serving two tracks with a siding. The station building is timber structure in western style which houses a waiting area and SUGOCA card reader. Access to the island platform is by means of a footbridge.

=== Platforms ===
1	■ ■ Nippō Main Line	for Miyakonojō and Kagoshima-Chūō
2	■ ■ Nippō Main Line	for Minami-Miyazaki and Miyazaki

== History ==
The station was opened on 20 March 1915 as the southern terminus of a line which Miyazaki Prefectural Railway had laid from Miyazaki. In the meantime, Japanese Government Railways (JGR) had opened the Miyazaki Line from Yoshimatsu to Miyakonojō on 8 October 1913 and had been expanding east and north towards Miyazaki in phases, reaching Aoidake by 21 March 1916. On 25 October 1916, the track at Kiyotake was linked up with the track from Aoidake. Miyazaki Prefectural Railway was nationalized. JGR designated the track to Miyazaki as part of the Miyazaki Line and later, on 21 September 1917, the Miyazaki Main Line. By 1923, the Miyazaki Main Line track had reached north to link up with the track of the Nippō Main Line at Shigeoka. On 15 December 1923, the entire stretch of track from Shigeoka through Miyazaki to Yoshimatsu, including Kiyotake, was designated as part of the Nippō Main Line. Freight operations were discontinued in 1971 and baggage handling in 1984.With the privatization of Japanese National Railways (JNR), the successor of JGR, on 1 April 1987, Kiyotake came under the control of JR Kyushu.

== Passenger statistics ==
In fiscal 2016, the station was used by an average of 520 passengers daily (boarding passengers only), and it ranked 243rd among the busiest stations of JR Kyushu.

== Surrounding area ==
- Miyazaki City Hall Kiyotake General Branch (formerly Kiyotake Town Hall)
- Miyazaki Gakuen Junior College
- Miyazaki International College
- University of Miyazaki Kiyotake Campus
- University of Miyazaki Hospital
- Miyazaki Prefectural Nursing University

== See also ==
- List of railway stations in Japan
