= Neven Sesardić =

Croatian philosopher

- Born: July 30, 1949 (age 77); Belgrade

Education
- Education: University of Zagreb

Philosophical work
- School: Analytic philosophy
- Institutions: Lingnan University
- Main interests: Philosophy of science, philosophy of biology, philosophy of mind
- Notable ideas: Heritability

Neven Sesardić (born 30 July 1949) is a Croatian philosopher known for his writings on heritability who worked most of his career as a professor at Lingnan University in Hong Kong.

== Life and career ==
He grew up in communist Yugoslavia. From 1977 to 1983 he worked as a lecturer at the University of Zagreb, and, from then, until 1989 he was assistant professor at the same university. In the 1980s he was listed as an "internal enemy" of the Yugoslav regime.

From 1989 to 1991 he was fellow of the Alexander von Humboldt Foundation at the University of Giessen. From 1991 to 1992 he worked as a Fellow of the Center for Interdisciplinary Research at Bielefeld University. The following two years (1992–94) he spent as an associate professor of philosophy at the University of Zagreb. The following academic year, 1994–1995, he worked as a visiting professor at the University of Notre Dame, while the following year (1995–96) he became an NSF Research Fellow at the University of Minnesota. Following that, in 1996 he became professor of philosophy at the Miyazaki International College, Japan, where he worked until 1999 when he was appointed research fellow at King's College London. From 2000 until 2006, he worked as an associate professor of philosophy at the Lingnan University, Hong Kong. From 2006 to 2015, he worked as a professor of philosophy at the Lingnan University. In 2015, he retired from Lingnan University.

He is a member of the American Philosophical Association (APA), the Croatian Philosophical Association, and the Philosophy of Science Association.

=== Publishing under a pseudonym ===
In 2008, Sesardić published a paper "Guilt by Statistical Association: Revisiting the Prosecutor's Fallacy and the Interrogator's Fallacy" in The Journal of Philosophy under the pseudonym "Carmen de Macedo". He revealed his authorship in 2011, writing that he submitted the article under a pseudonym because the journal did not have a practice of double-blind peer review. The journal had changed its policy in 2010. After philosopher M. V. Dougherty wrote to the Journal, they published a corrigendum in 2017 acknowledging that de Macedo's name was a pseudonym, and that Sesardić was the actual author.

== Books ==
- Fizikalizam ("Physicalism"), Belgrade: IIC (Istraživačko-izdavački centar SSO Srbije), 1984
- Marxian Utopia? (with Domenico Settembrini), London: CRCE, 1985. ISBN 0-948027-01-0
- Iz analitičke perspektive ("From an analytical perspective"), Zagreb: Sociološko društvo Hrvatske, 1991.
- Making Sense of Heritability, Cambridge: Cambridge University Press, 2005. ISBN 0-521-82818-X
- Iz desne perspektive ("From the right perspective"), Zagreb: Večernji list, 2012. ISBN 978-953-280-166-8
- When Reason Goes on Holiday: Philosophers in Politics, New York: Encounter Books, 2016. ISBN 1594038791
