= Kiyotake =

Kiyotake (written: 清武 or 清健) is both a Japanese surname and a masculine Japanese given name. Notable people with the name include:

Surname:

- Hiroji Kiyotake (清武 博二) (born 1960), Japanese video game designer
- Hiroshi Kiyotake (清武 弘嗣) (born 1989), Japanese footballer
- Koki Kiyotake (清武 功暉) (born 1991), Japanese footballer

Given name:

- Kiyotake Kawaguchi (川口 清健) (1892–1961), Japanese general

== See also ==
- Kiyotake, Miyazaki (清武町, Kiyotake-chō), former town in Miyazaki District, Miyazaki Prefecture, Japan
- Kiyotake Station (清武駅, Kiyotake-eki), train station in Miyazaki Prefecture
