= Kanō Station =

Kanō Station is the name of multiple railway stations in Japan.

- Kanō Station (Miyazaki) in Kiyotake, Miyazaki, served by the JR Nippo Main Line
- Kanō Station (Gifu) in Gifu, Gifu, served by the Meitetsu Nagoya Main Line
- Gifu Station in Gifu, Gifu, originally called Kanō Station when it opened, served by Central Japan Railway
