= Kitagawa Station =

Railway station in Nobeoka, Miyazaki Prefecture, Japan

Kitagawa Station 北川駅
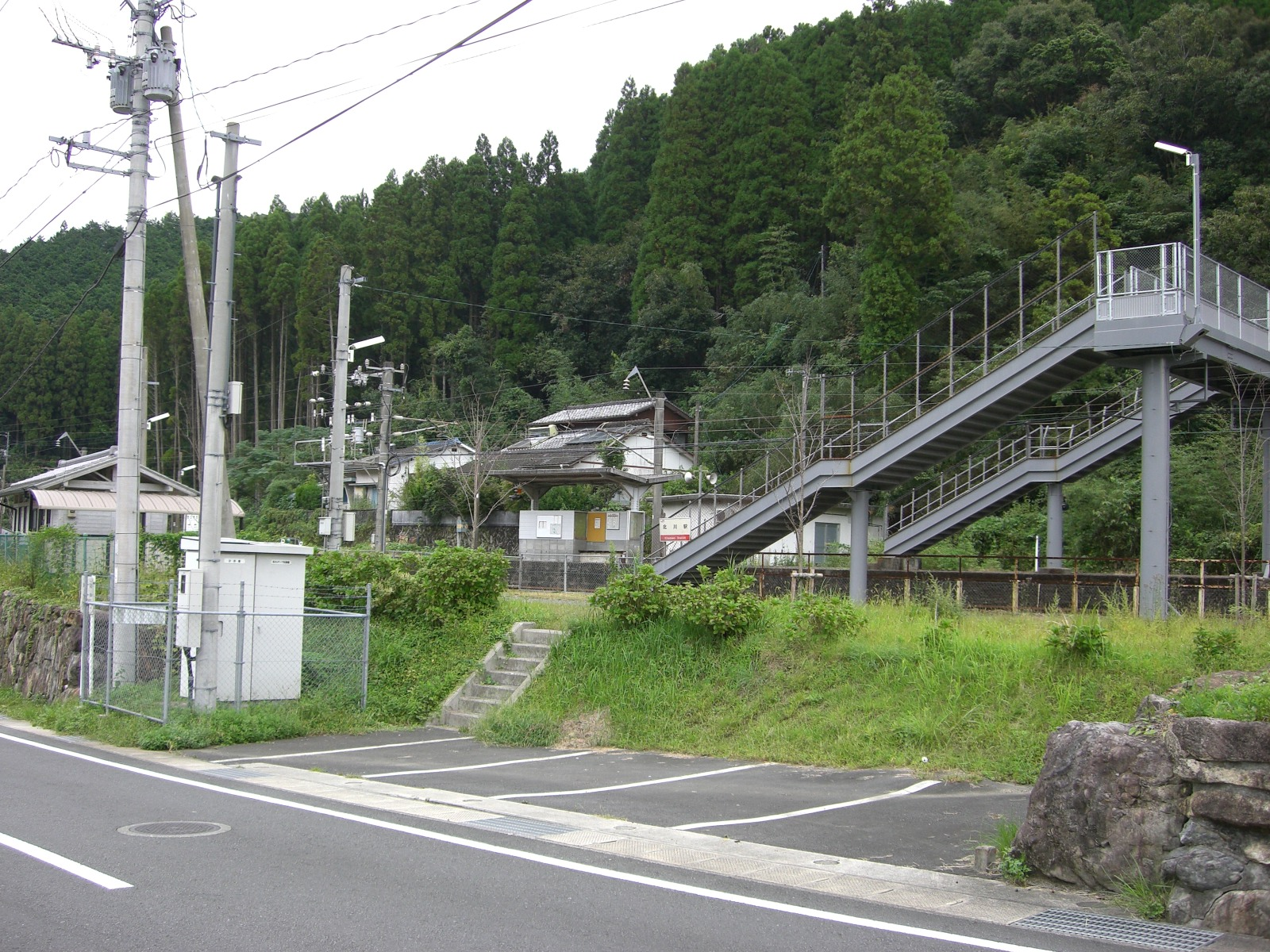
- Kitagawa Station in 2007

General information
- Location: Kitagawamachi Kawachimyo, Nobeoka-shi, Miyazaki-ken 889-0101; Japan
- Coordinates: 32°41′26″N 131°41′52″E
- Operator: JR Kyushu
- Line: ■ Nippō Main Line
- Distance: 243.2 km from Kokura
- Platforms: 1 island platform
- Tracks: 2

Construction
- Structure type: Side hill cutting
- Parking: Limited
- Cycle facilities: Bike shed
- Accessible: No - island platform accessed by footbridge

Other information
- Status: Unstaffed
- Website: Official website

History
- Opened: 1 May 1949

Passengers
- FY2016: 24 daily

Services
Preceding station	JR Kyushu	Following station
Hyūga-Nagai towards Kagoshima	Nippō Main Line	Ichitana towards Kokura
Location
- Location within Miyazaki Prefecture Location within Japan

Kitagawa Station (北川駅, Kitagawa-eki) is a railway station in Nobeoka, Miyazaki, Japan. It is operated by of JR Kyushu and is on the Nippō Main Line.

== Lines ==
The station is served by the Nippō Main Line and is located 243.2 km from the starting point of the line at Kokura. Only local trains stop at this station.

== Layout ==
The station consists of an island platform serving two tracks on a side hill cutting. There is no station building. From the access road, a short flight of steps leads to the station entrance from where a footbridge gives access to the island platform. A bike shed is provided near the footbridge and limited parking is available at the base of the step by the access road.

=== Platforms ===
1	■ ■ Nippō Main Line	for Saiki and Oita
2	■ ■ Nippō Main Line	for Nobeoka and Miyazaki

== History ==
Japanese Government Railways (JGR) opened the station on 1 May 1949 as an additional station on the existing track of the Nippō Main Line. Baggage handling was abolished in 1972 and the station became unstaffed. With the privatization of Japanese National Railways (JNR), the successor of JGR, on 1 April 1987, the station came under the control of JR Kyushu.

== Passenger statistics ==
In fiscal 2016, the station was used by an average of 24 passengers (boarding only) per day.

== Surrounding area ==
- Nobeoka City Hall Kitagawa General Branch (formerly Kitagawa Town Hall)
- Nobeoka City Kitagawa Junior High School
- Nobeoka City Kitagawa Elementary School

== See also ==
- List of railway stations in Japan
