= Hyūga-Kutsukake Station =

Railway station in Miyazaki, Miyazaki Prefecture, Japan

Hyūga-Kutsukake Station 日向沓掛駅
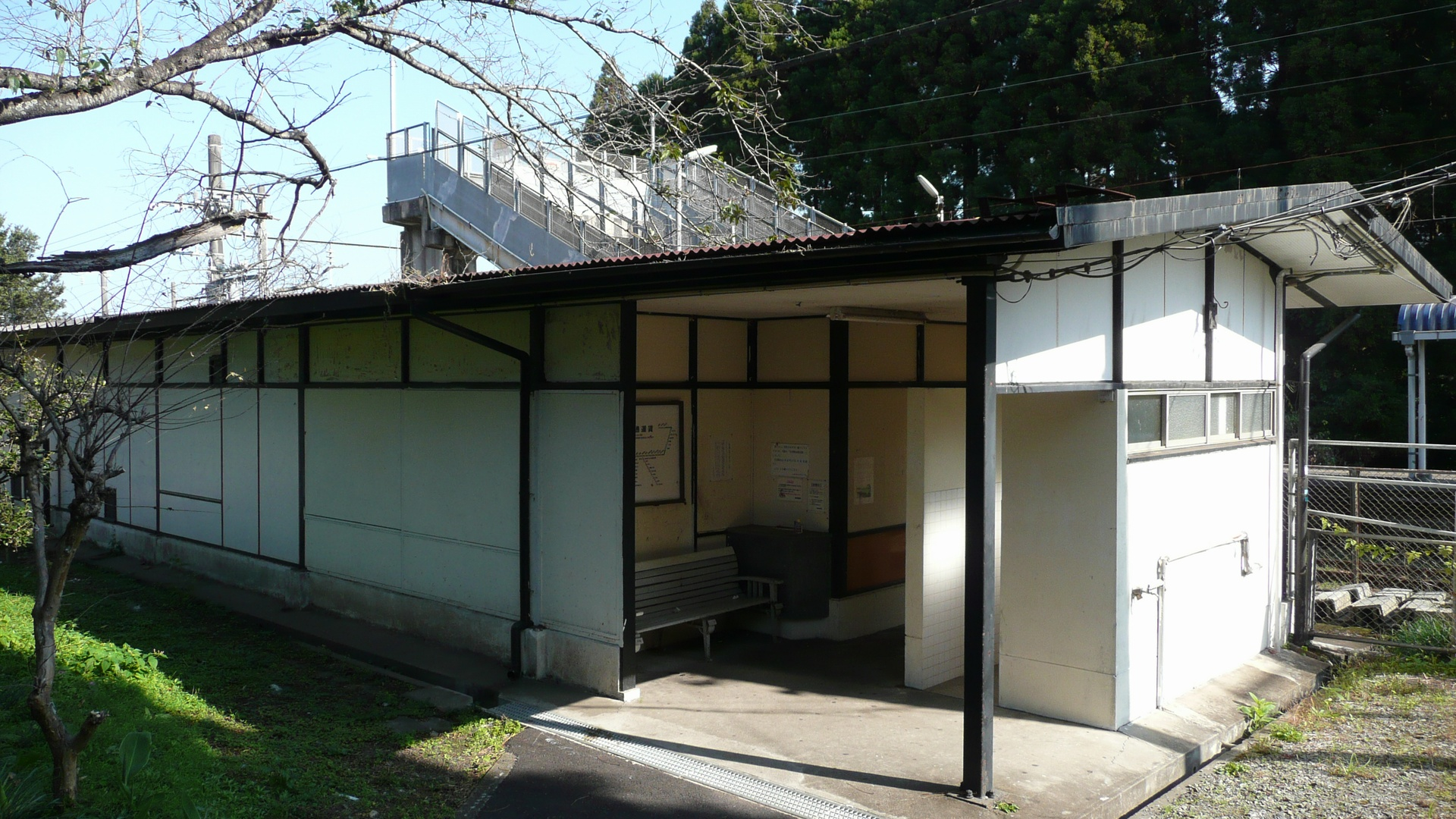
- Hyūga-Kutsukake Station in 2007

General information
- Location: Imaizumiko Kiyotakecho, Miyazaki-shi, Miyazaki-ken 889-1602; Japan
- Coordinates: 31°50′32″N 131°20′41″E
- Operator: JR Kyushu
- Line: ■ Nippō Main Line
- Distance: 352.5 km from Kokura
- Platforms: 1 island platform
- Tracks: 2

Construction
- Structure type: At grade
- Cycle facilities: Designated parking area for bicycles
- Accessible: No - island platform accessed by footbridge

Other information
- Status: Unstaffed
- Website: Official website

History
- Opened: 15 September 1965

Passengers
- FY2016: 85 daily

Services
Preceding station	JR Kyushu	Following station
Tano towards Kagoshima	Nippō Main Line	Kiyotake towards Kokura
Location
- Location within Miyazaki Prefecture Location within Japan

Hyūga-Kutsukake Station (日向沓掛駅, Hyūga-Kutsukake-eki) is a passenger railway station located in Miyazaki City, Miyazaki Prefecture, Japan. It is operated by JR Kyushu and is on the Nippō Main Line.

== Lines ==
The station is served by the Nippō Main Line and is located 352.5 km from the starting point of the line at Kokura.

== Layout ==
The station, which is unstaffed, consists of an island platform serving two tracks. The station building is simple functional prefabricated structure which houses a waiting area, a SUGOCA card reader and a toilet. Access to the island platform is by means of a footbridge.

=== Platforms ===
1	■ ■ Nippō Main Line	for Minami-Miyazaki and Miyazaki
2	■ ■ Nippō Main Line	for Miyakonojō and Kagoshima-Chūō

== History ==
Japanese National Railways (JNR) opened the facility as the Hyūga-Kutsukake signal box on 15 September 1965. It was upgraded to a full station on 1 October 1965, two weeks later. With the privatization of JNR on 1 April 1987, the station came under the control of JR Kyushu.

== Passenger statistics ==
In fiscal 2016, the station was used by an average of 85 passengers (boarding only) per day.

== Surrounding area ==
- Kiyotake Driving School
- Japan National Route 269

== See also ==
- List of railway stations in Japan
