= Sōtarō Station =

Railway station in Saiki, Ōita Prefecture, Japan

Sōtarō Station 宗太郎駅
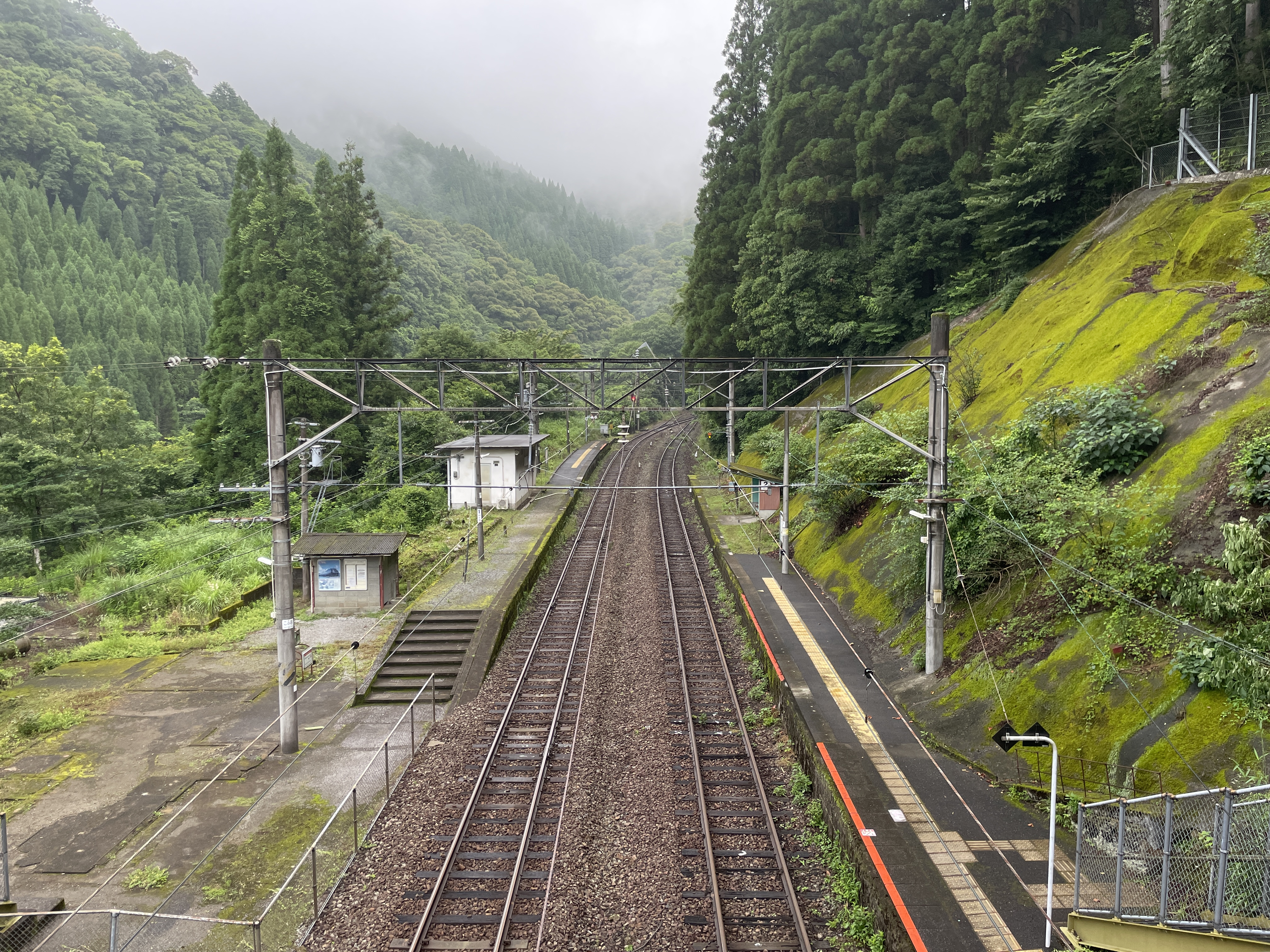
- Sōtarō Station in 2023

General information
- Location: Ume Oaza Shigeoka, Saiki-shi, Ōita-ken 879-3204; Japan
- Coordinates: 32°47′11″N 131°42′24″E
- Operator: JR Kyushu
- Line: ■ Nippō Main Line
- Distance: 231.0 km from Kokura
- Platforms: 2 side platforms
- Tracks: 2 + 1 siding

Construction
- Structure type: Side hill cutting
- Accessible: No - platform accessed by footbridge

Other information
- Status: Unstaffed
- Website: Official website

History
- Opened: 15 December 1923

Passengers
- FY2015: 144 per year

Services
Preceding station	JR Kyushu	Following station
Ichitana towards Kagoshima	Nippō Main Line	Shigeoka towards Kokura
Location
- Location within Oita Prefecture Location within Japan

Sōtarō Station (宗太郎駅, Sōtarō-eki) is a passenger railway station located in the city of Saiki, Ōita, Japan. It is operated by JR Kyushu.

== Lines ==
The station is served by the Nippō Main Line and is located 231.0 km from the starting point of the line at Kokura.

== Layout ==
The station consists of two side platforms serving two track with a siding set on a side hill cutting in a remote mountainous area. The station is not staffed and there is no station building. A small shed and a public telephone call box are provided as a passenger shelter near the station entrance and another shelter is provided on the opposite side platform. The platforms are linked by a footbridge.

=== Platforms ===
1	■ ■ Nippō Main Line	for Saiki
2	■ ■ Nippō Main Line	for Nobeoka

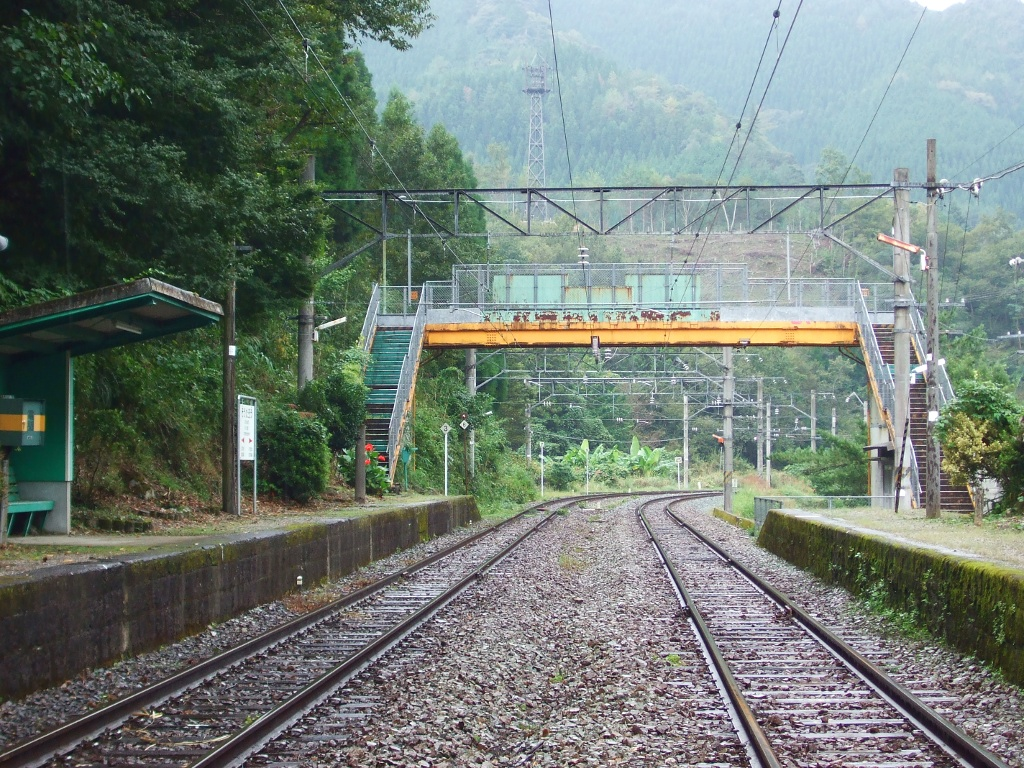
Footbridge connecting platforms

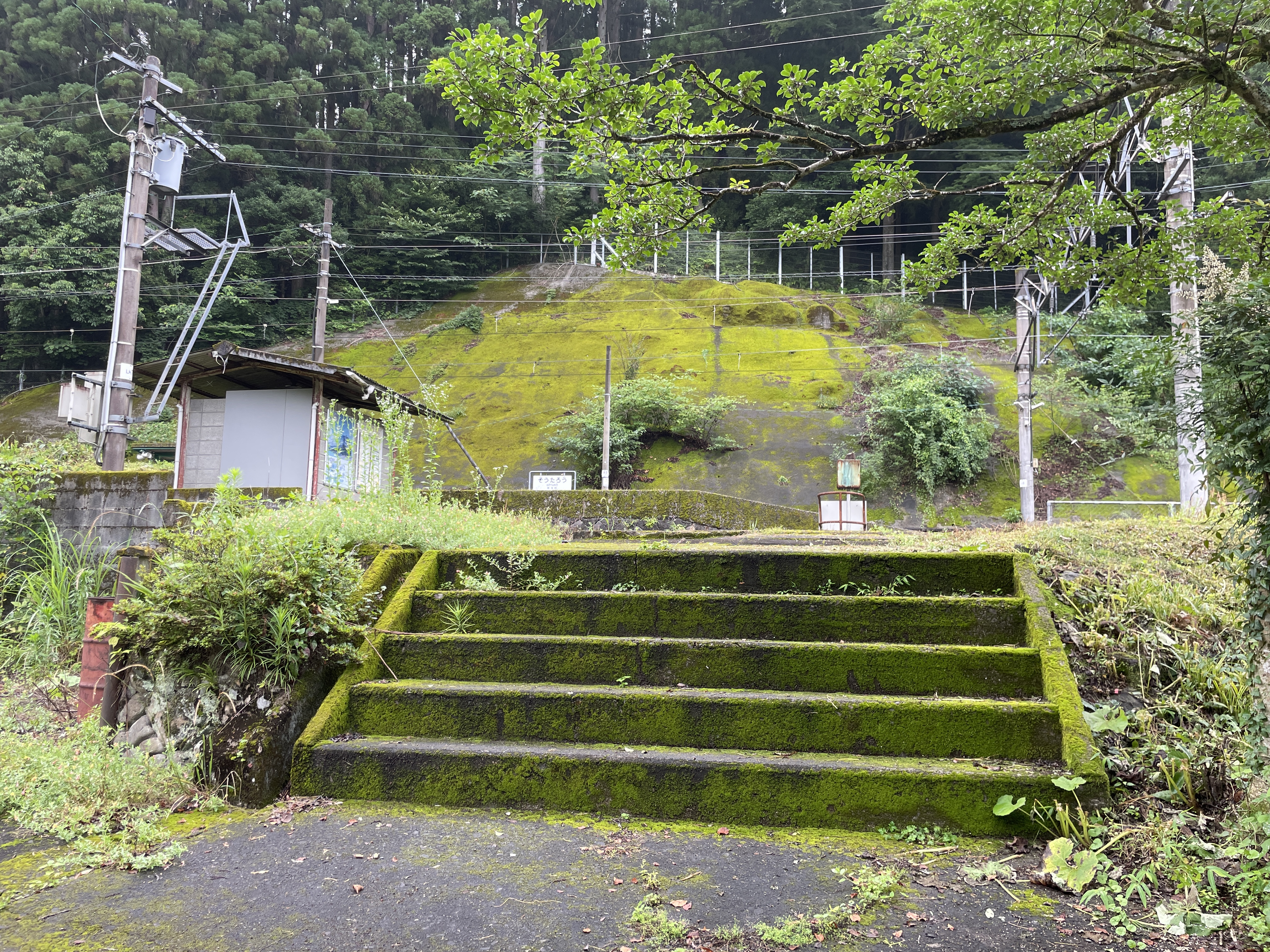
Station entrance

== History ==
The private Kyushu Railway had, by 1909, through acquisition and its own expansion, established a track from Kokura to Yanagigaura down the east coast of Kyushu. The Kyushu Railway was nationalised on 1 July 1907. Japanese Government Railways (JGR), designated the track as the Hōshū Main Line on 12 October 1909 and expanded it southwards in phases over the next 13 years, establishing Shigeoka as its southern terminus on 26 March 1922. At the same time, JGR had been expanding its Miyazaki Main Line north from Miyazaki, reaching Ichitana, just 9 km south of Shigeoka by July 1923. The link up between the two lines was achieved on 15 December 1923, establishing through traffic from Kokura in the north to Miyakonojō. The entire stretch of track was then renamed the Nippō Main Line. On the same day, Sōtarō was opened as a signal box on the linking track. On 1 March 1947, Sōtarō was upgraded to a full station. The station has been unattended since 1972. With the privatization of Japanese National Railways (JNR), the successor of JGR, on 1 April 1987, the station came under the control of JR Kyushu.

== Passenger statistics ==
In fiscal 2015, there were a total of 144 boarding passengers, giving a daily average of less than 1 passenger.

== Surrounding area ==
- Japan National Route 10

== See also ==
- List of railway stations in Japan
