= Miyazaki Prefectural Nursing University =

Coordinates: 31°51′34″N 131°24′52″E

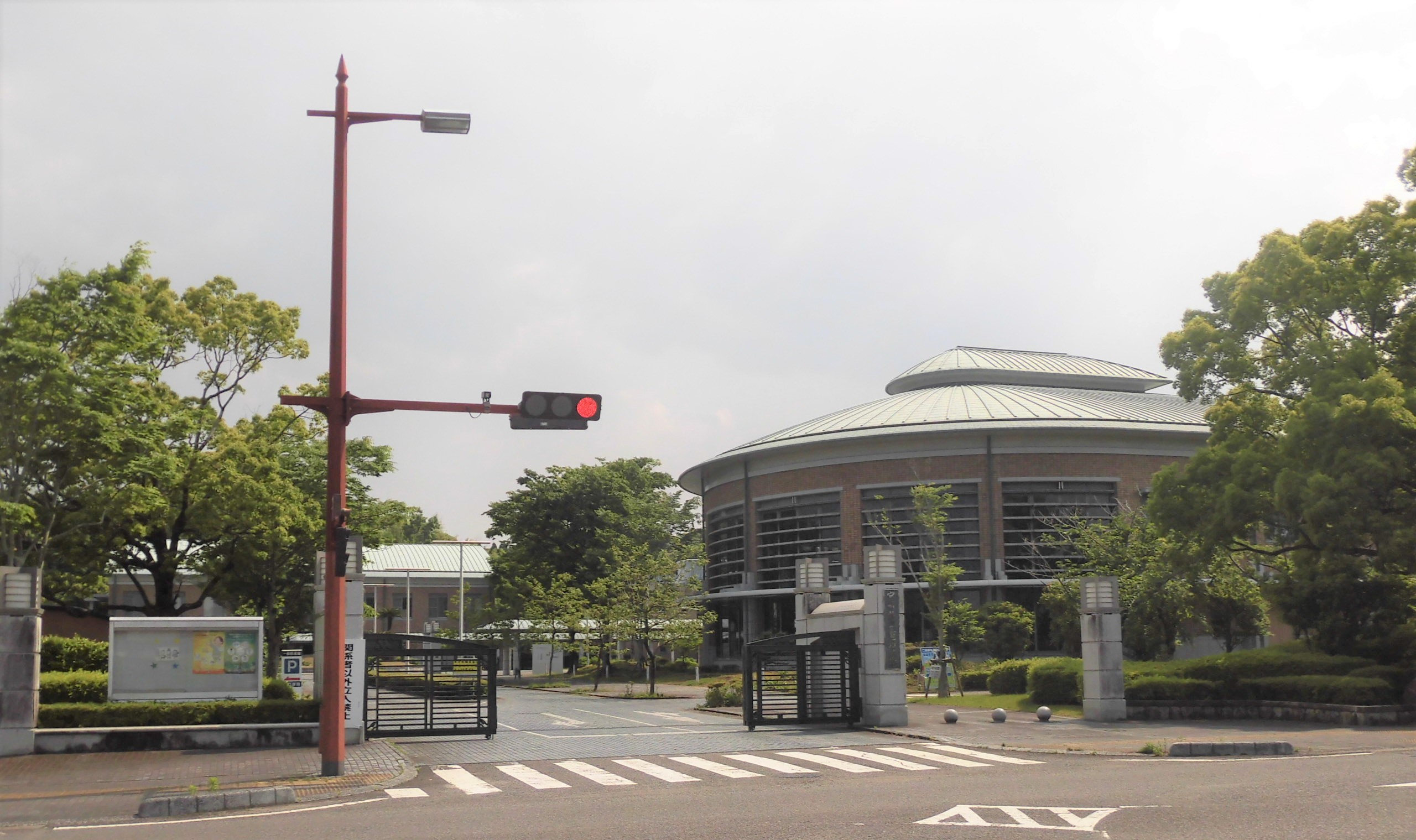
University entrance

Miyazaki Prefectural Nursing University (宮崎県立看護大学, Miyazaki-kenritsu kango daigaku) is a public university in Miyazaki, Miyazaki, Japan, established in 1997. A master's program was added in 2001.
