= Ichitana Station =

Railway station in Nobeoka, Miyazaki Prefecture, Japan

Coordinates: 32°43′42″N 131°42′37″E

Ichitana Station 市棚駅
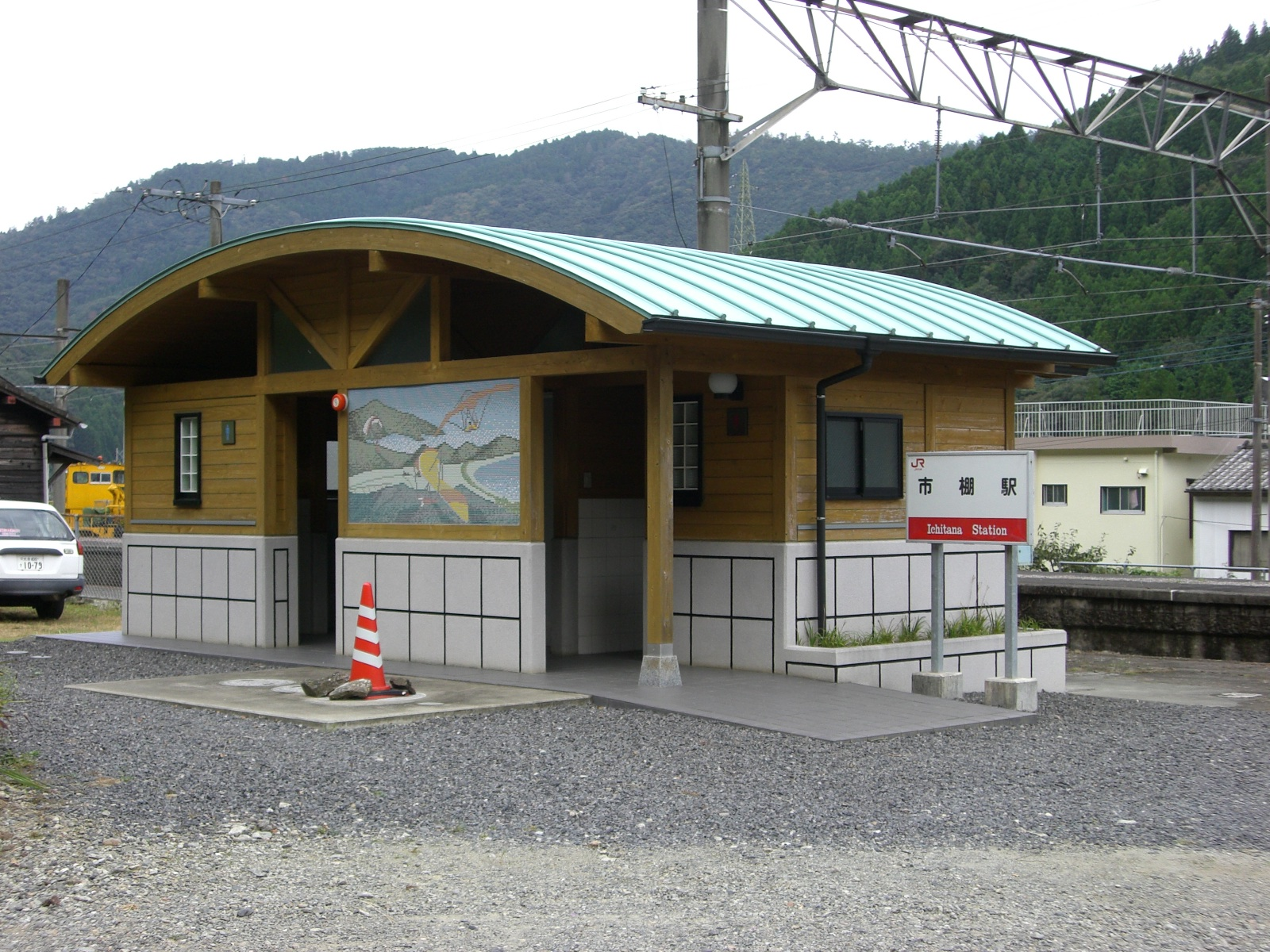
- Ichitana Station in 2007

General information
- Location: Kitagawamachi Kawachimyo, Nobeoka-shi, Miyazaki-ken 889-0101; Japan
- Operator: JR Kyushu
- Line: ■ Nippō Main Line
- Distance: 238.5 km from Kokura
- Platforms: 1 side + 1 island platforms
- Tracks: 3 + 1 siding

Construction
- Structure type: At grade
- Accessible: No - island platform accessed by footbridge

Other information
- Status: Unstaffed
- Website: Official website

History
- Opened: 1 July 1923

Passengers
- FY2015: 13 daily

Services
Preceding station	JR Kyushu	Following station
Kitagawa towards Kagoshima	Nippō Main Line	Sōtarō towards Kokura
Location
- Location within Miyazaki Prefecture Location within Japan

Ichitana Station (市棚駅, Ichitana-eki) is a passenger railway station in the city of Nobeoka, Miyazaki, Japan. It is operated by of JR Kyushu.

It is the easternmost and northernmost station in Miyazaki Prefecture; between this station and Sotaro Station, is the prefectural border between Oita Prefecture and Miyazaki Prefecture.

== Lines ==
The station is served by the Nippō Main Line and is located 238.5 km from the starting point of the line at Kokura. Only local trains stop at this station.

== Layout ==
The station consists of a side platform and an island platform serving three tracks at grade with a siding branching off track 3, all set in an open area of rural farmland. The station is not staffed and is no station building but a public toilet has been set up at the station entrance which also has a passenger shelter on the other side. Access to the island platform is by means of a footbridge. A bike shed is provided at the station forecourt.

=== Platforms ===
1	■ ■ Nippō Main Line	for Saiki
2	■ ■ Nippō Main Line	for passage of express and freight trains
3	■ ■ Nippō Main Line	for Nobeoka

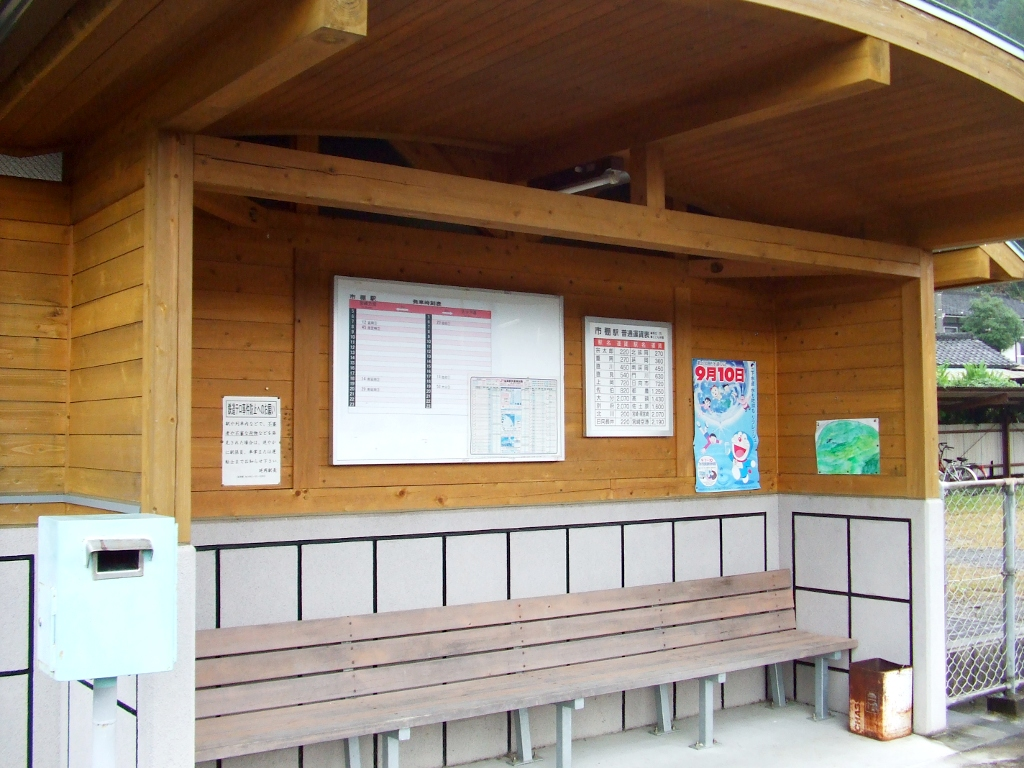
Passenger shelter. This is on the other side of the toilet building seen in the top image.

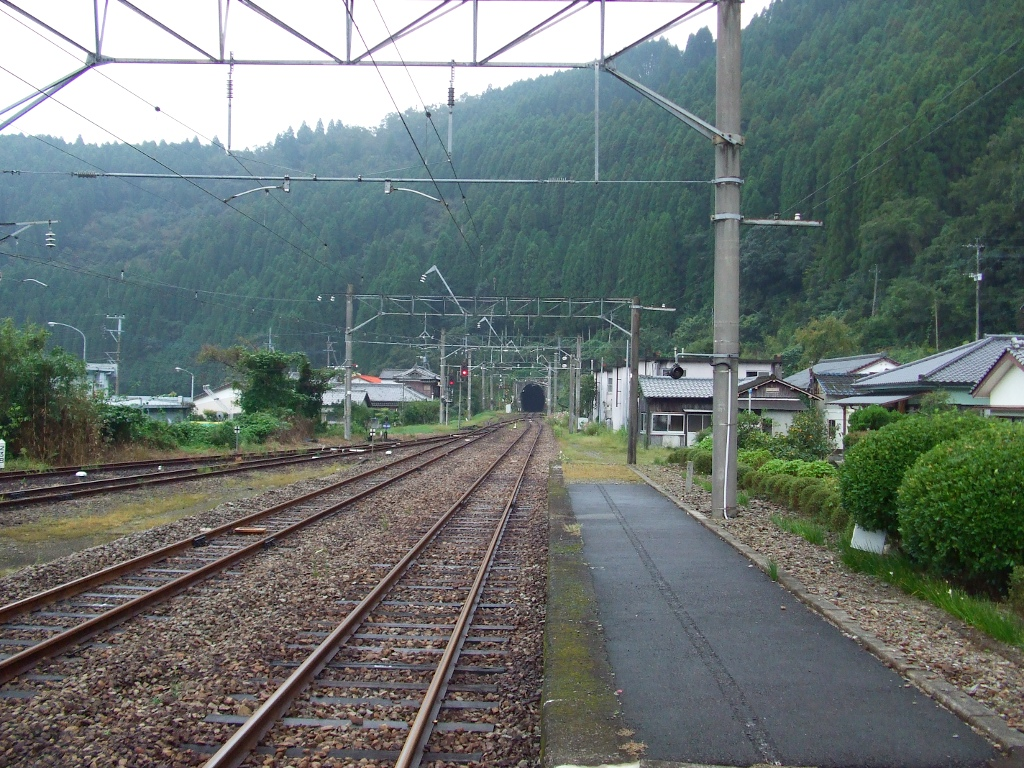
A view of the tracks at the station, looking south. The siding can be seen branching off to the left.

== History ==
In 1913, the Miyazaki Prefectural Railway (宮崎県営鉄道) had opened a line from Miyazaki northwards to Hirose (now closed). After the Miyazaki Prefectural Railway was nationalized on 21 September 1917, Japanese Government Railways (JGR) undertook the subsequent extension of the track which it designated as the Miyazaki Main Line. Expanding north in phases, the track reached Ichitana which was established as the northern terminus on 1 July 1923. At the same time, JGR had been expanding its Hoshū Line south from Kokura down the east coast of Kyushu, reaching its southern terminus of Shigeoka just 9 km north of Ichitana by March 1922. The link up between the two lines was achieved on 15 December 1923, through-traffic was thus established from Kokura through Ichitana to Miyakonojō. The entire stretch of track was then renamed the Nippō Main Line. Freight operations and baggage handling were abolished in 1972 and the station became unstaffed. With the privatization of Japanese National Railways (JNR), the successor of JGR, on 1 April 1987, the station came under the control of JR Kyushu.

== Passenger statistics ==
In fiscal 2016, the station was used by an average of 13 passengers (boarding only) per day.

== Surrounding area ==
- Japan National Route 10
- Kagamiyama Observatory
- Kagamiyama Paragliding Takeoff Field

== See also ==
- List of railway stations in Japan
