= Kanō Station (Miyazaki) =

Railway station in Miyazaki, Miyazaki Prefecture, Japan

Kanō Station 加納駅
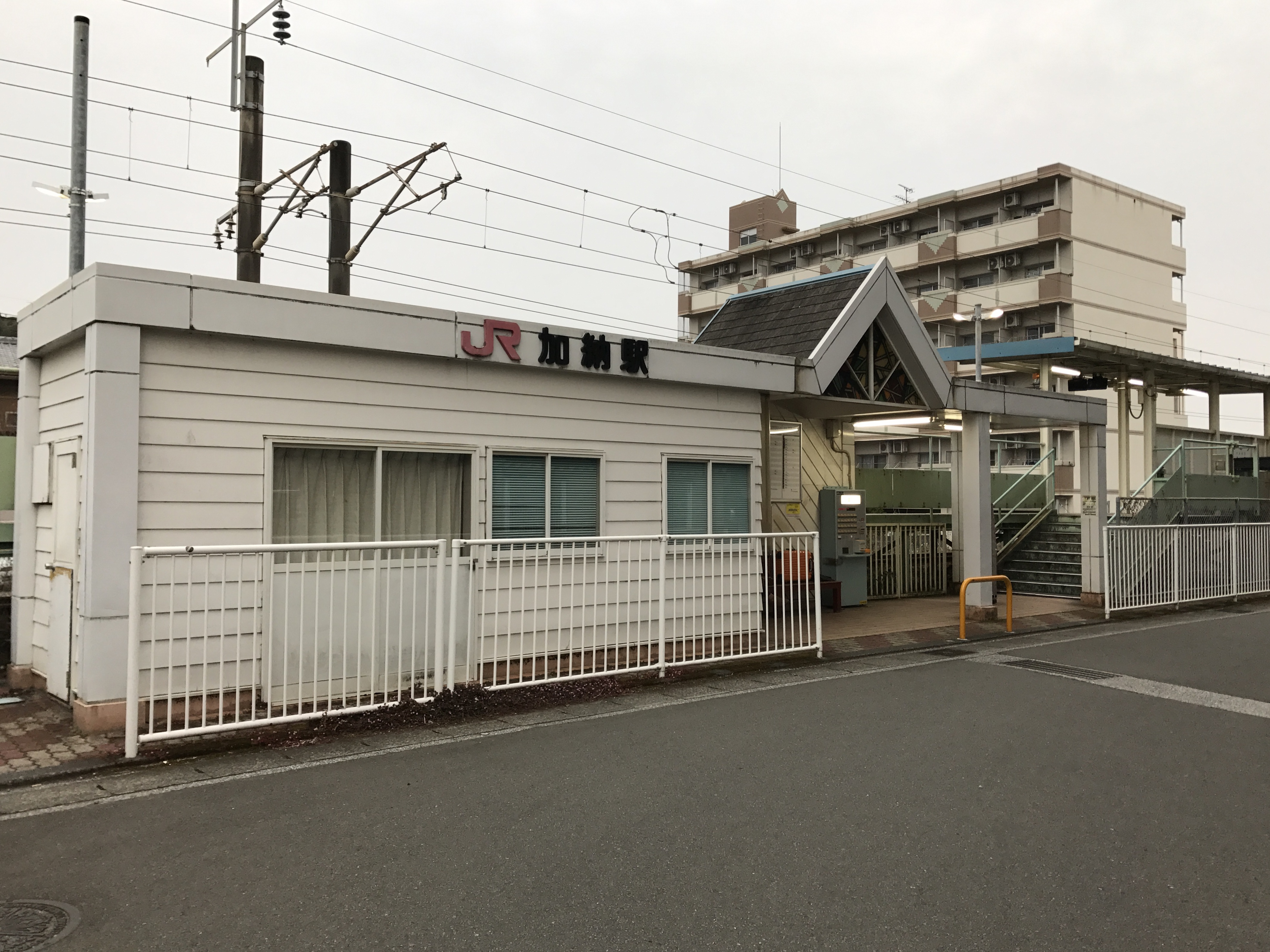
- Kanō Station in 2017

General information
- Location: Otsu Kiyotakecho, Miyazaki-shi, Miyazaki-ken 889-1605; Japan
- Coordinates: 31°52′33″N 131°24′22″E
- Operator: JR Kyushu
- Line: ■ Nippō Main Line
- Distance: 345.1 km from Kokura
- Platforms: 1 side platform
- Tracks: 1

Construction
- Structure type: At grade
- Accessible: No - steps to platform

Other information
- Status: Unstaffed
- Website: Official website

History
- Opened: 11 March 1989

Passengers
- FY2016: 194 daily

Services
Preceding station	JR Kyushu	Following station
Minami-Miyazaki towards Kagoshima	Nippō Main Line	Kiyotake towards Kokura
Location
- Location within Miyazaki Prefecture Location within Japan

Kanō Station (加納駅, Kanō-eki) is a passenger railway station located in Miyazaki City, Miyazaki Prefecture, Japan. It is operated by JR Kyushu and is on the Nippō Main Line.

== Lines ==
The station is served by the Nippō Main Line and is located 345.1 km from the starting point of the line at Kokura. Only local trains stop at this station.

== Layout ==
The station, which is unstaffed, consists of a side platform serving a single track set in a confined urban area among high-rise buildings. The station building is narrow modern wooden structure adorned with a triangular gable and stained glass. The ticket window is unstaffed but an automatic ticket vending machine and SUGOCA card reader is provided. A short flight of steps leads up to the platform.

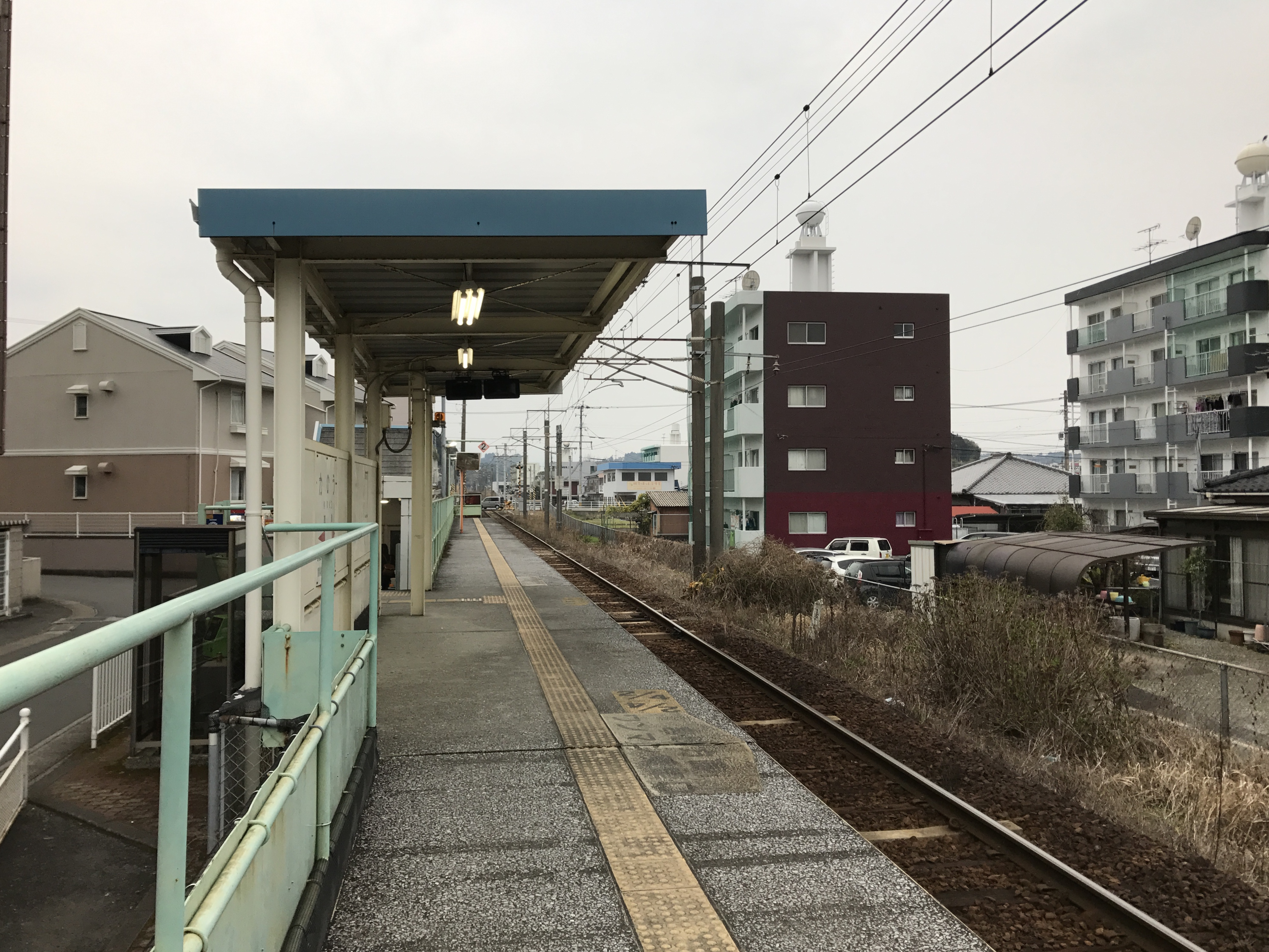
A view of the station platform and track.

== History ==
JR Kyushu opened the station on 11 March 1989 as an additional station on the existing track of the Nippō Main Line.

== Passenger statistics ==
In fiscal 2016, the station was used by an average of 194 passengers (boarding only) per day.

== Surrounding area ==
The area is a residential area on the outskirts of Miyazaki City.

- Japan National Route 269
- Miyazaki University of Industrial Management

== See also ==
- List of railway stations in Japan
