= Miyazaki Gakuen Junior College =

Coordinates: 31°51′36″N 131°23′40″E

Miyazaki Gakuen Junior College (宮崎学園短期大学, Miyazaki gakuen tanki daigaku) is a private junior college in Kiyotake, Miyazaki, Japan, established in 1965.
