= Miyazaki International University =

Higher education institution in Miyazaki Prefecture, Japan

Coordinates: 31°51′39″N 131°23′42″E

- 宮崎国際大学
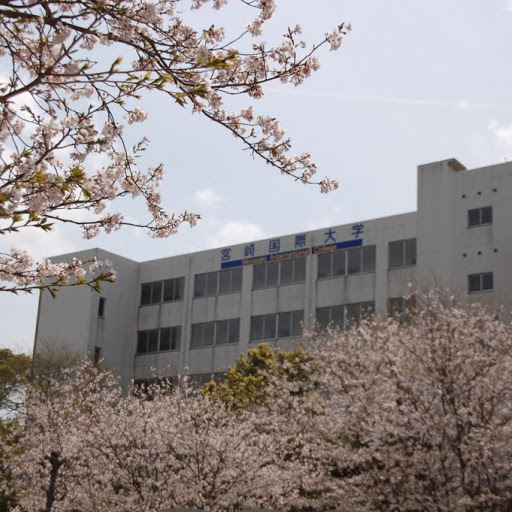
- Sakura trees at MIU
- President: Keiko Yamashita
- Dean: Anderson Passos, Dean of Faculty
- Location: Kiyotake, Miyazaki, Japan
- Prefecture: Miyazaki
- Website: https://www.miu.ac.jp
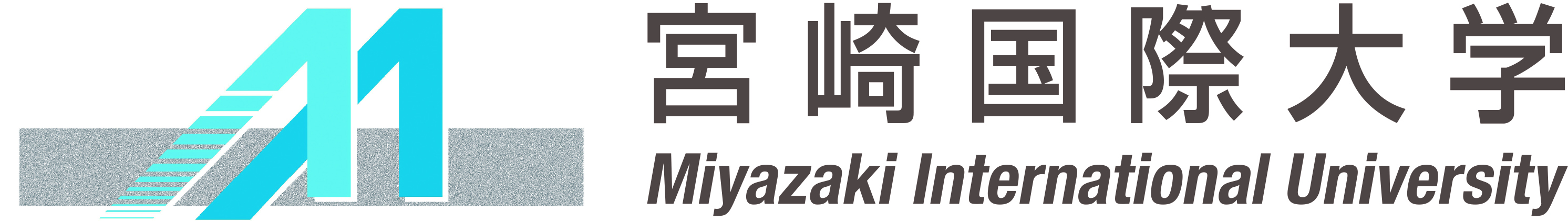

Miyazaki International University (Japanese: 宮崎国際大学), also known as Miyazaki International College, is a private university in Miyazaki Prefecture, Japan.

== History ==
The college (MIC) was founded in 1994 by Miyazaki Gakuen, a chartered educational corporation established in 1939. It has a School of International Liberal Arts and School of Education. Its School of International Liberal Arts, founded in 1994, was established under the credo, "Respect and Diligence", for the stated purpose of cultivating truly international individuals. In April 2014, a School of Education was established.

Miyazaki International College, in addition to Miyazaki Gakuen Junior College, Miyazaki Gakuen High School and Miyazaki Gakuen Junior High School, and the Miyazaki Gakuen Junior College-Affiliated Midori Kindergarten and Kiyotake Midori Kindergarten, is sponsored by the Miyazaki Educational Institution (MEI), a chartered educational corporation established in 1939.

== Legal issues ==
In 2015, MIC cut the salaries of contracted faculty over the age of sixty by twenty percent, resulting in outrage among the university community. This resulted in a lawsuit before the Miyazaki District Court, which MIC won.

However, plaintiffs appealed to the Miyazaki Branch of the Fukuoka High Court. On 8 December 2021, the Court ruled in favour of the educators, and sanctioned MIC for its illegal actions under Japanese labour laws. Head judge Ryousuke Takanashi said that "for the educators, this is disproportionate, and the university did not even take measures that would alleviate the disadvantages that come with such a pay cut", rebuking MIC.
