= Shigeoka Station =

Railway station in Saiki, Ōita Prefecture, Japan

Shigeoka Station 重岡駅
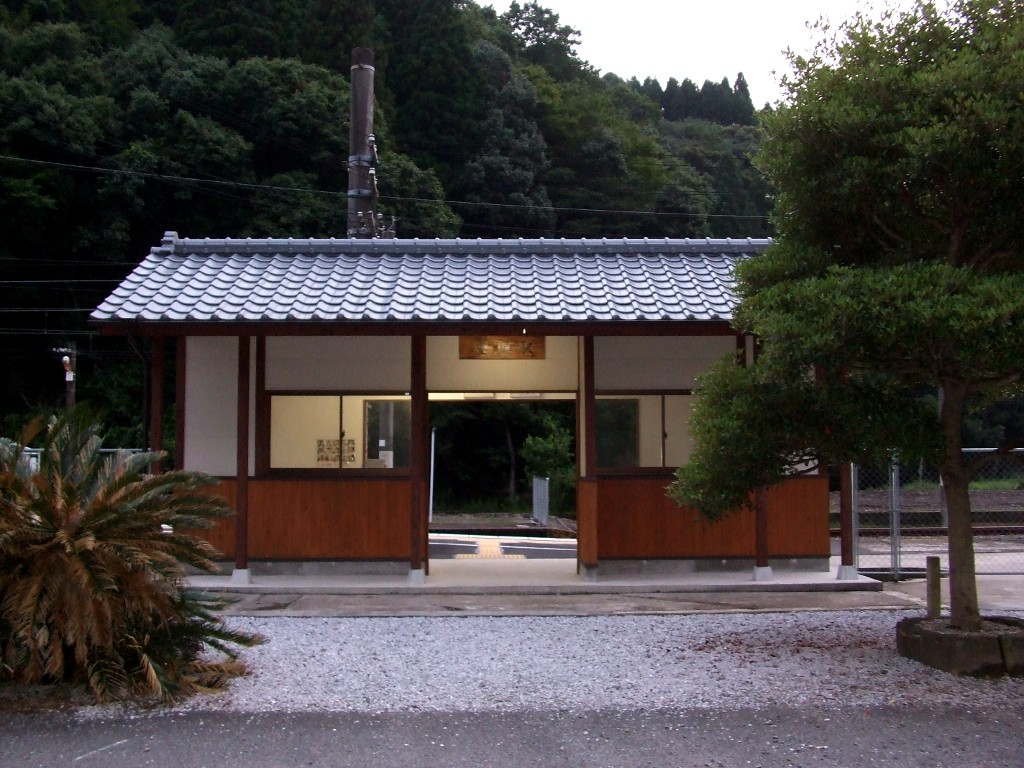
- Shigeoka Station in 2007

General information
- Location: Ume Oaza Ohira, Saiki-shi, Ōita-ken 879-3201; Japan
- Coordinates: 32°50′25″N 131°42′56″E
- Operator: JR Kyushu
- Line: ■ Nippō Main Line
- Distance: 224.2 km from Kokura
- Platforms: 1 side + 1 island platforms
- Tracks: 3 + 1 siding

Construction
- Structure type: At grade
- Accessible: No - platform accessed by footbridge

Other information
- Status: Unstaffed
- Website: Official website

History
- Opened: 26 March 1922

Passengers
- FY2015: 16 daily

Services
Preceding station	JR Kyushu	Following station
Sōtarō towards Kagoshima	Nippō Main Line	Naokawa towards Kokura
Location
- Location within Oita Prefecture Location within Japan

Shigeoka Station (重岡駅, Shigeoka-eki) is a passenger railway station located in the city of Saiki, Ōita, Japan. It is operated by JR Kyushu.

== Lines ==
The station is served by the Nippō Main Line and is located 224.2 km from the starting point of the line at Kokura.

== Layout ==
The station, which is not staffed, consists of a side platform and an island platform serving three tracks. A siding branches off track 1, ending on the other side of the side platform. There is no station building, but a wooden shed in traditional Japanese style has been set up as a waiting room. Access to the island platform is by means of a footbridge.

=== Platforms ===
1	■ ■ Nippō Main Line	for Nobeoka
2, 3	■ ■ Nippō Main Line	for Saiki

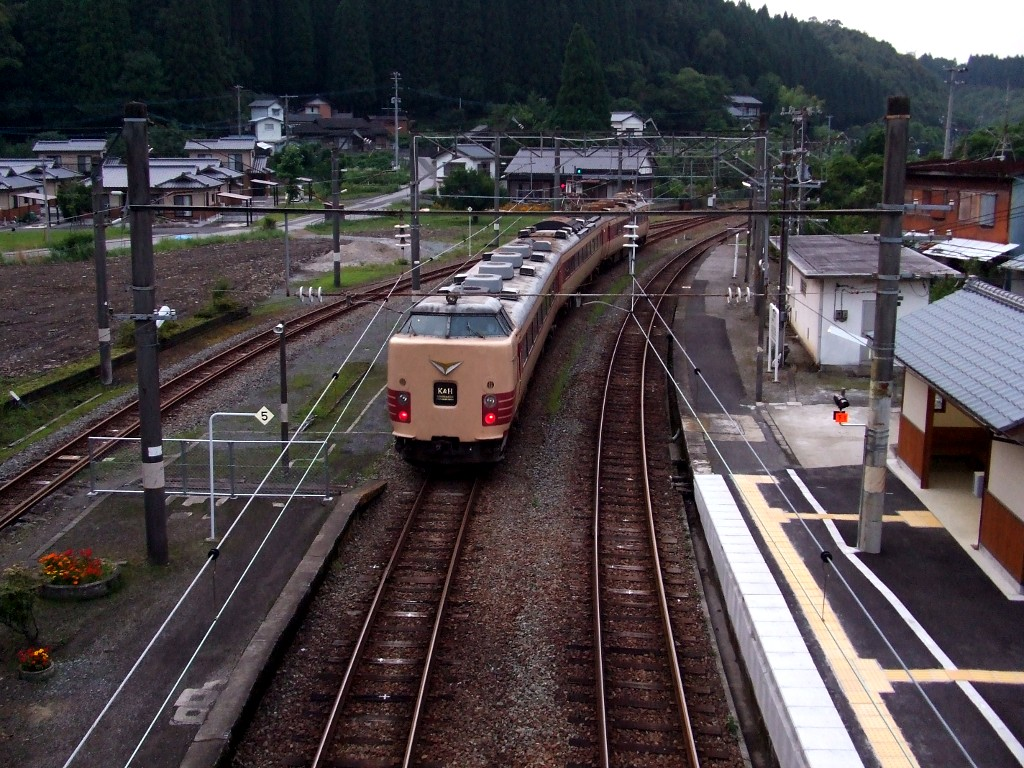
A view of the station platforms looking north.

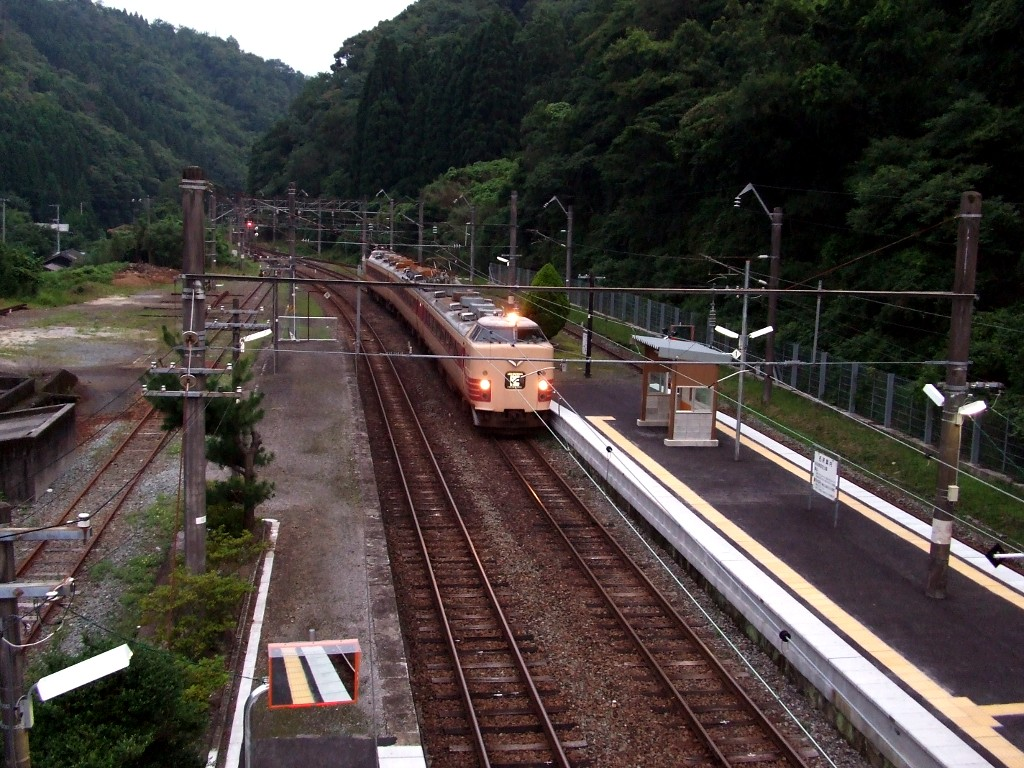
A view of the station platform looking south. The siding can be seen branching off to the left.

== History ==
The private Kyushu Railway had, by 1909, through acquisition and its own expansion, established a track from Kokura to Yanagigaura down the east coast of Kyushu. The Kyushu Railway was nationalised on 1 July 1907. Japanese Government Railways (JGR), designated the track as the Hōshū Main Line on 12 October 1909 and expanded it southwards in phases over the next 13 years, establishing Shigeoka as its southern terminus on 26 March 1922. Subsequently, the track was further extended to meet the Miyazaki Main Line which had been extending northwards from Miyazaki and which had reached Ichitana by July 1923. The link up between the two lines was achieved on 15 December 1923, and through traffic was thus established from Kokura in the north through Shigeoka to Miyakonojō. The entire stretch of track was then renamed the Nippō Main Line. With the privatization of Japanese National Railways (JNR), the successor of JGR, on 1 April 1987, the station came under the control of JR Kyushu.

== Passenger statistics ==
In fiscal 2015, there were a total of 5,978 boarding passengers, giving a daily average of 16 passengers.

== Surrounding area ==
- Japan National Route 10

== See also ==
- List of railway stations in Japan
