= Kita-Naganoda Station =

Railway station in Kirishima, Kagoshima Prefecture, Japan

Kita-Naganoda Station 北永野田駅
- Kita-Naganoda Station in 2026

General information
- Location: 3348 Kirishimanagamizu, Kirishima-shi, Kagoshima-ken 899-4202; Japan
- Coordinates: 31°46′56″N 130°52′28″E
- Operator: JR Kyushu
- Line: ■ Nippō Main Line
- Distance: 413.4 km from Kokura
- Platforms: 2 side platforms
- Tracks: 2

Construction
- Structure type: At grade
- Accessible: No - platforms accessed by footbridge or steps

Other information
- Status: Unstaffed
- Website: Official website

History
- Opened: 6 December 1932

Passengers
- FY2016: 6

Services
Preceding station	JR Kyushu	Following station
Kirishima-Jingū towards Kagoshima	Nippō Main Line	Ōsumi-Ōkawara towards Kokura
Location
- Location within Kagoshima Prefecture Location within Japan

Kita-Naganoda Station (北永野田駅, Kita-Naganoda-eki) is a passenger railway station located in the city of Kirishima, Kagoshima, Japan. It is operated by JR Kyushu and is on the Nippō Main Line.

== Lines ==
The station is served by the Nippō Main Line and is located 413.4 km from the starting point of the line at Kokura.

== Layout ==
The station, which is unstaffed, consists of two side platforms serving two tracks at grade. The station building, a simple shed of modern construction, is located on a hillside at a higher level than the platforms. From there, a flight of steps leads down to one platform and a footbridge leads to the other.

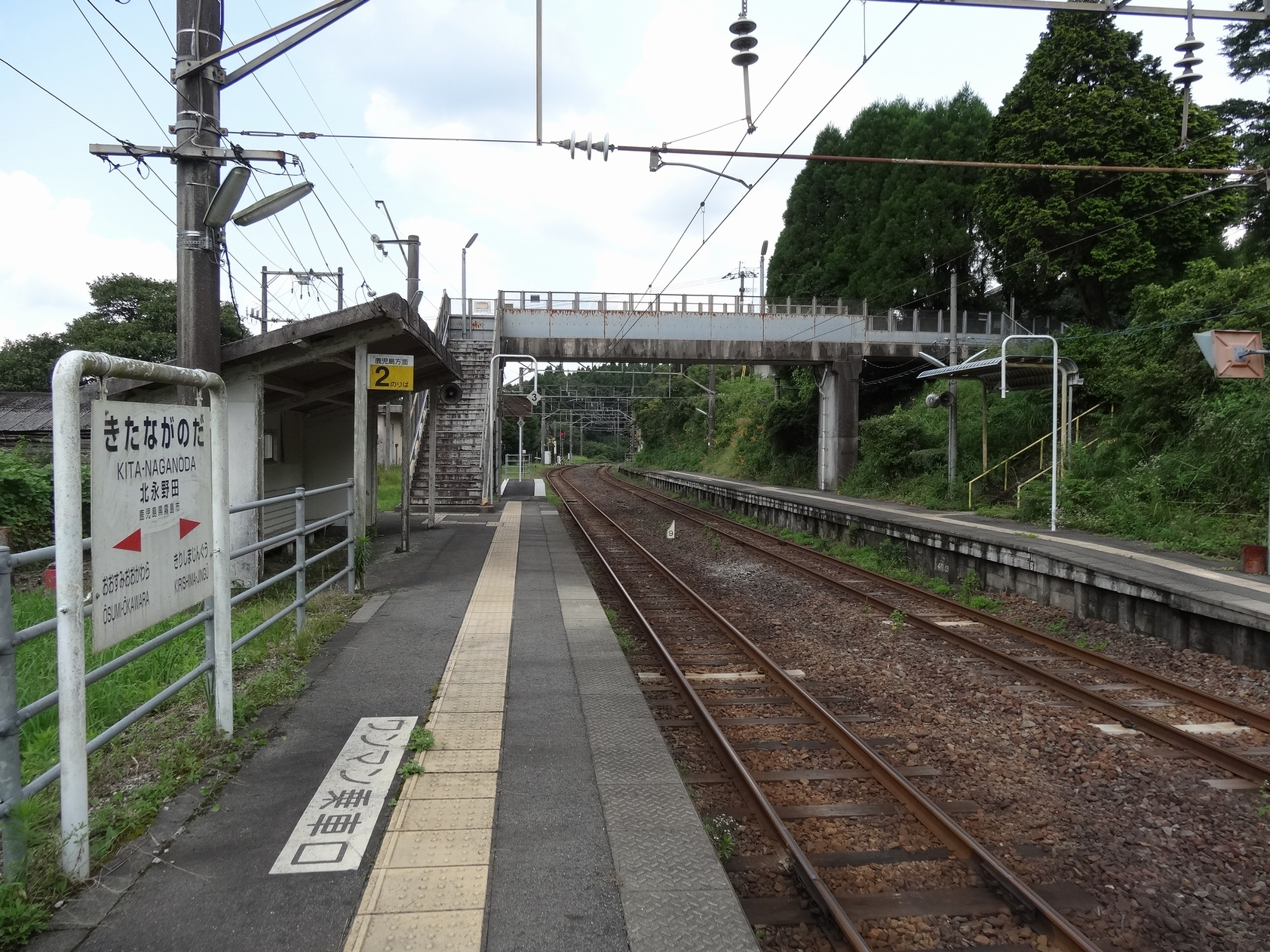
A view of the platforms. The stairs to the station building can be seen on the right.

== Platforms ==
1	■ ■ Nippō Main Line	for Kokubu and Kagoshima-Chūō
2	■ ■ Nippō Main Line	for Miyakonojō and Miyazaki

== History ==
Japanese Government Railways (JGR) had opened the then Kokuto-West Line (国都西線) which, by July 1930, extended from Nishi-Kokubu (now Hayato) to its northern terminus at Kirishima-Jingū. Further to the north, another line, the then Kokuto East Line (国都東線) had also been laid which, by November 1931, extended from Nishi-Miyakonojō to its southern terminus at Ōsumi-Ōkawara. Subsequently, the two lines were linked and Kita-Naganoda was built as an intermediate station along the new linking track, opening on 6 December 1932. With the completion of this link, through-traffic was achieved from Kokura in the north of Kyushu island all the way to Kagoshima in the south. The entire stretch of track was designated as the Nippō Main Line. With the privatization of Japanese National Railways (JNR), the successor of JGR, on 1 April 1987, the station came under the control of JR Kyushu.

== Passenger statistics ==
In fiscal 2016, the station was used by an average of 9 passengers daily.

== Surrounding area ==
- Yoshigaya River

== See also ==
- List of railway stations in Japan
