= Takarabe Station =

Railway station in Soo, Kagoshima Prefecture, Japan

Takarabe Station 財部駅
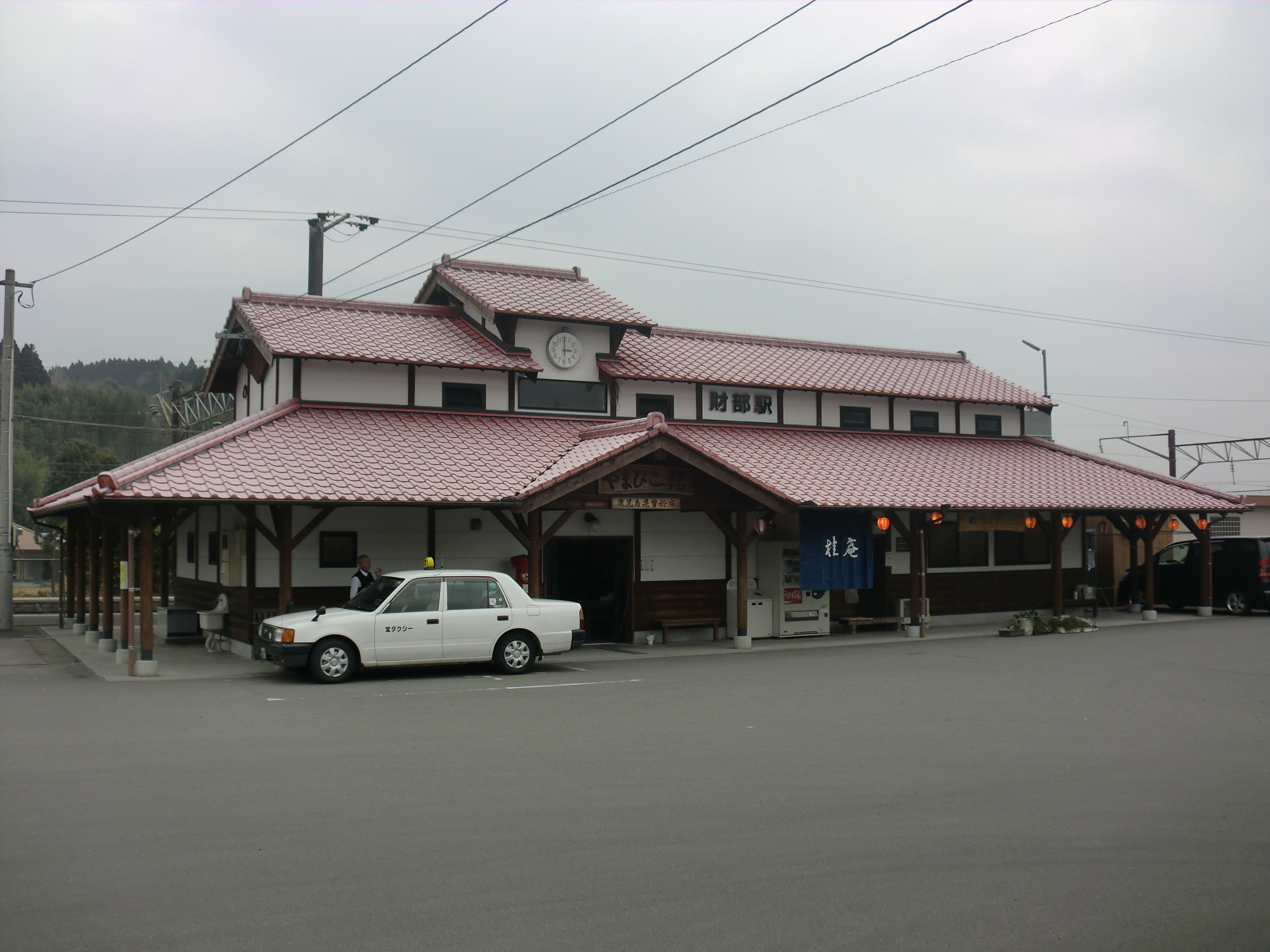
- Takarabe Station in 2013

General information
- Location: 1822 Takarabechō-Kitamata, Soo-shi, Kagoshima-ken 899-4102; Japan
- Coordinates: 31°43′43″N 130°59′30″E
- Operator: JR Kyushu
- Line: ■ Nippō Main Line
- Distance: 399.4 km from Kokura
- Platforms: 2 side platforms
- Tracks: 2 + 1 siding

Construction
- Structure type: At grade
- Parking: Available
- Cycle facilities: Bike shed
- Accessible: No - platforms linked by footbridge

Other information
- Status: Unstaffed
- Website: Official website

History
- Opened: 28 April 1929
- Rebuilt: 2008

Passengers
- FY2015: 159

Services
Preceding station	JR Kyushu	Following station
Kitamata towards Kagoshima	Nippō Main Line	Isoichi towards Kokura
Location
- Location within Kagoshima Prefecture Location within Japan

Takarabe Station (財部駅, Takarabe-eki) is a passenger railway station located in the city of Soo, Kagoshima, Japan. It is operated by JR Kyushu and is on the Nippō Main Line.

== Lines ==
The station is served by the Nippō Main Line and is located 399.4 km from the starting point of the line at Kokura.

== Layout ==
The station consists of two side platforms serving two tracks with a siding. The station building was rebuilt in 2008 and is a two-storey Japanese-style building with a double tiled roof. It houses a waiting area, a restaurant and a community interaction centre but the ticket window is not staffed. Access to the opposite side platform is by means of a footbridge.

== Platforms ==
1	■ ■ Nippō Main Line	for Hayato and Kagoshima-Chūō
2	■ ■ Nippō Main Line	for Miyakonojō and Miyazaki

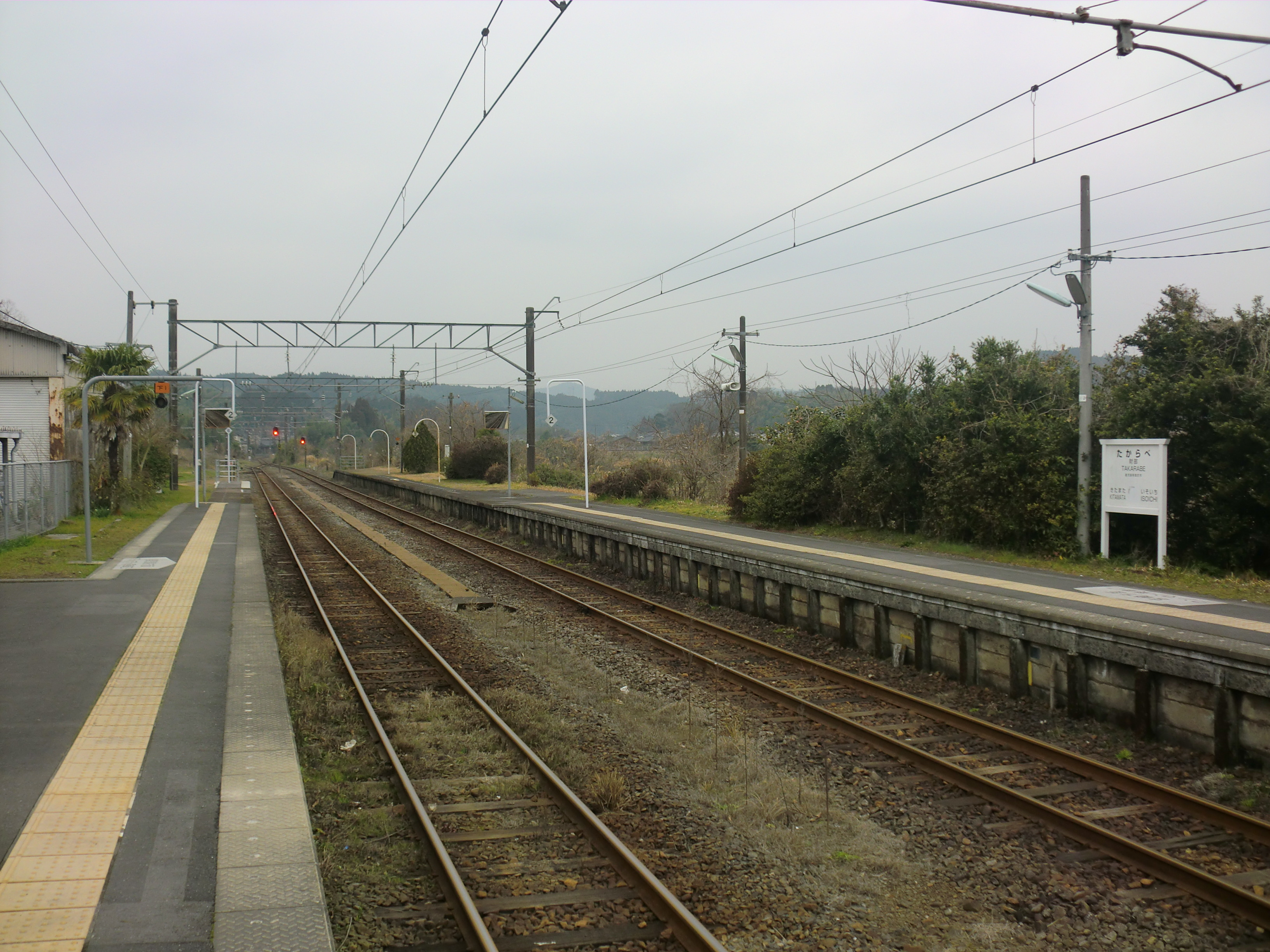
A view of the platforms and tracks. The siding can be seen in the distance branching left.

== History ==
Takarabe Station was opened on 28 April 1929 by Japanese Government Railways (JGR) as the southern terminus of the then Kokutō East Line (国都東線) from Nishi-Miyakonojō. It became a through-station on 1 November 1931 when the track was extended further south to Ōsumi-Ōkawara. By 1932, the track had been linked up with other networks north and south, and through traffic had been established from Kokura, through this station to Kagoshima. The station and the Kokutō East Line were then absorbed and were designated as part of the Nippō Main Line on 6 December 1932. With the privatization of Japanese National Railways (JNR), the successor of JGR, on 1 April 1987, the station came under the control of JR Kyushu.

== Passenger statistics ==
In fiscal 2015, the station was used by an average of 159 passengers daily

== Surrounding area ==
- Soo City Hall Takarabe Branch
- Soo City Takarabe Elementary School
- Soo City Takarabe Junior High School
- Takarabe Chūō Hospital
- Takarabe Post office

== See also ==
- List of railway stations in Japan
