= Kirishima-Jingū Station =

Railway station in Kirishima, Kagoshima Prefecture, Japan

Kirishima-Jingū Station 霧島神宮駅
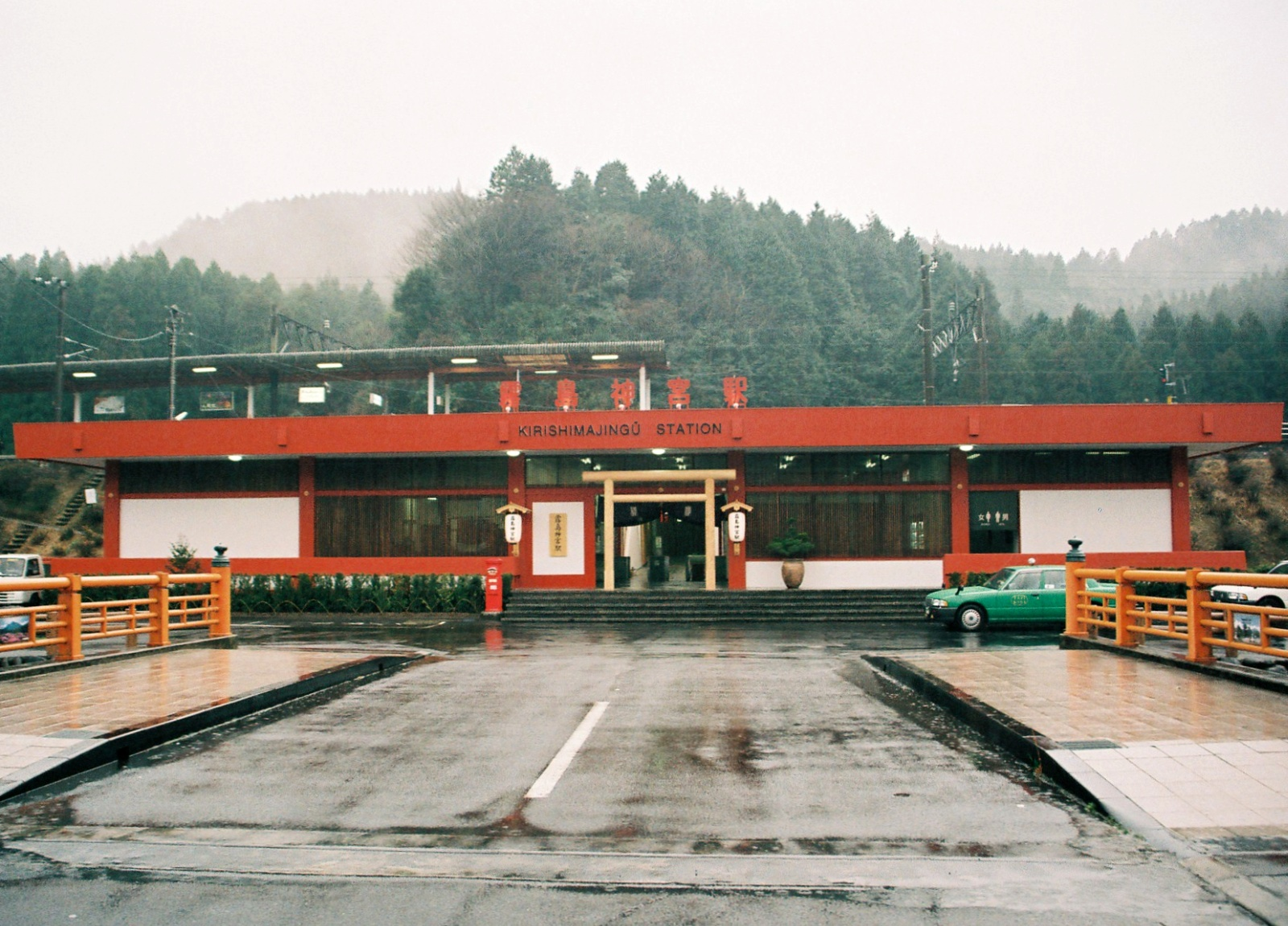
- Kirishima-Jingū Station in 2004

General information
- Location: Kirishimaōkubo, Kirishima-shi, Kagoshima-ken 899-4203; Japan
- Coordinates: 31°49′07″N 130°50′12″E
- Operator: JR Kyushu
- Line: ■ Nippō Main Line
- Distance: 419.4 km from Kokura
- Platforms: 1 island platform
- Tracks: 2 + 1 siding

Construction
- Structure type: Embankment
- Accessible: No - steps lead up to platform

Other information
- Status: Staffed ticket window (outsourced)
- Website: Official website

History
- Opened: 10 July 1930

Passengers
- FY2016: 400

Services
Preceding station	JR Kyushu	Following station
Kokubu towards Kagoshima	Nippō Main Line	Kita-Naganoda towards Kokura
Location
- Location within Kagoshima Prefecture Location within Japan

Kirishima-Jingū Station (霧島神宮駅, Kirishima-Jingū -eki) is a passenger railway station located in the city of Kirishima, Kagoshima, Japan. It is operated by JR Kyushu and is on the Nippō Main Line.

== Lines ==
The station is served by the Nippō Main Line and is located 419.4 km from the starting point of the line at Kokura.

== Layout ==
The station consists of an island platform serving two tracks with a siding all on an embankment. The station building, located at the base of the embankment, is a modern structure built of timber in traditional Japanese style to resemble the nearby Kirishima-Jingū Shrine. From the station building, a tunnel leads under the embankment and up a flight of steps to the island platform.

Management of the passenger facilities at the station has been outsourced to the JR Kyushu Tetsudou Eigyou Co., a wholly owned subsidiary of JR Kyushu specialising in station services. It staffs the ticket booth which is equipped with a POS machine but does not have a Midori no Madoguchi facility.

== Platforms ==
1	■ ■ Nippō Main Line	for Kokubu and Kagoshima-Chūō
2	■ ■ Nippō Main Line	for Miyakonojō and Miyazaki

== History ==
On 24 November 1929 by Japanese Government Railways (JGR) had opened the then Kokuto-West Line (国都西線) from Nishi-Kokubu (now Hayato) to Kokubu. In the next phase of expansion, the track was extended eastwards, with Kirishima-Jingū opening as the new eastern terminus on 10 July 1930. Subsequently, the Kokuto-West Line was expanded to the east and north, linking up with the Kokuto-East Line at Ōsumi-Ōkawara and other networks so that by the end of 1932, through-traffic had been established between Kokura and Kagoshima. On 6 December 1932, the entire stretch of track from Kokura through this station to Kagoshima was redesignated as the Nippō Main Line. With the privatization of Japanese National Railways (JNR), the successor of JGR, on 1 April 1987, the station came under the control of JR Kyushu.

== Passenger statistics ==
In fiscal 2016, the station was used by an average of 400 passengers daily.

== Surrounding area ==
- Kirishima-Jingū Shrine (~6.5 km)
- Kirishima Onsen (~11 km)
- Kirishima Post Office
- Kirishima City Hall Kirishima Branch
- Kirishima Municipal Kirishima Junior High School

== See also ==
- List of railway stations in Japan
