= Kitamata Station =

Railway station in Soo, Kagoshima Prefecture, Japan

Kitamata Station 北俣駅
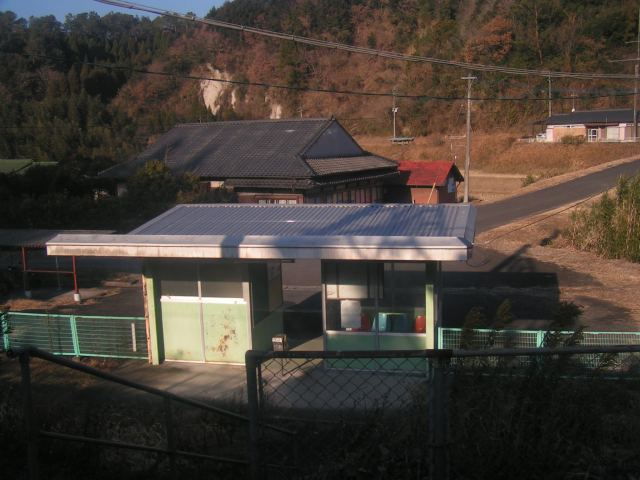
- Kitamata Station in 2005

General information
- Location: 4070 Takarabechō-Kitamata, Soo-shi, Kagoshima-ken 899-4102; Japan
- Coordinates: 31°44′42″N 130°57′36″E
- Operator: JR Kyushu
- Line: ■ Nippō Main Line
- Distance: 403.0 km from Kokura
- Platforms: 2 side platforms
- Tracks: 2

Construction
- Structure type: Low embankment
- Accessible: No - platforms linked by footbridge

Other information
- Status: Unstaffed
- Website: Official website

History
- Opened: 1 November 1931

Passengers
- FY2015: 2

Services
Preceding station	JR Kyushu	Following station
Ōsumi-Ōkawara towards Kagoshima	Nippō Main Line	Takarabe towards Kokura
Location
- Location within Kagoshima Prefecture Location within Japan

Kitamata Station (北俣駅, Kitamata-eki) is a passenger railway station located in the city of Soo, Kagoshima, Japan. It is operated by JR Kyushu and is on the Nippō Main Line.

== Lines ==
The station is served by the Nippō Main Line and is located 403.0 km from the starting point of the line at Kokura.

== Layout ==
The station consists of two side platforms serving two tracks on a low embankment. The station building is a simple functional shed which is unstaffed and serves only to house a waiting area. From there, a short flight of steps leads up the embankment to the first platform. Access to the opposite side platform is by means of a footbridge.

== Platforms ==
1	■ ■ Nippō Main Line	for Miyakonojō and Miyazaki
2	■ ■ Nippō Main Line	for Hayato and Kagoshima-Chūō

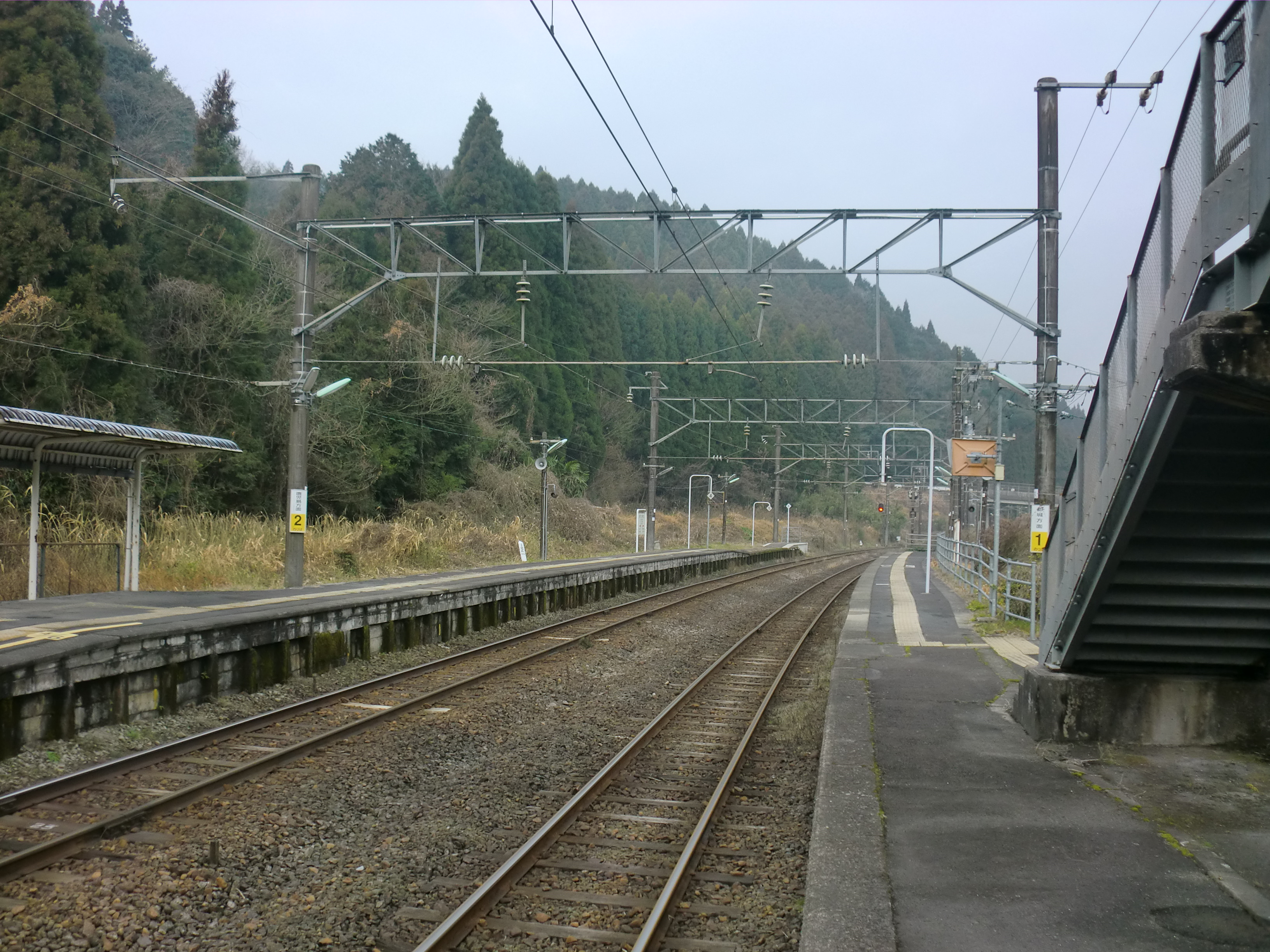
Platforms

== History ==
On 28 April 1929, Japanese Government Railways (JGR) opened the Kokuto East Line (国都東線) from Nishi-Miyakonojō to Takarabe. In the next phase of expansion, the track was extended to Ōsumi-Ōkawara which opened as the new southern terminus on 1 November 1931. On the same day Kitamata was opened as an intermediate station on the new track. By 1932, the track had been linked up with other networks north and south, and through traffic had been established from Kokura, through this station to Kagoshima. The station and the Kokuto East Line were then absorbed and were designated as part of the Nippō Main Line on 6 December 1932. With the privatization of Japanese National Railways (JNR), the successor of JGR, on 1 April 1987, the station came under the control of JR Kyushu.

== Passenger statistics ==
In fiscal 2015, the station was used by an average of 2 passengers daily.

== Surrounding area ==
- Tomb of Hirata Sangoro Hirata and Miyauchi Shikibu (historic site)

== See also ==
- List of railway stations in Japan
