= Kokubu Station (Kagoshima) =

Railway station in Kirishima, Kagoshima Prefecture, Japan

Kokubu Station 国分駅
- Kokubu Station in 2026

General information
- Location: 3-chōme-46 Kokubuchūō, Kirishima-shi, Kagoshima-ken 899-4332; Japan
- Coordinates: 31.7436°N 130.7634°E
- Operator: JR Kyushu
- Line: ■ Nippō Main Line
- Distance: 432.1 km from Kokura
- Platforms: 1 side + 1 island platforms
- Tracks: 3 + 2 sidings

Construction
- Structure type: At grade
- Parking: Available
- Cycle facilities: Bike shed

Other information
- Status: Staffed ticket window (Midori no Madoguchi) (outsourced)
- Website: Official website

History
- Opened: 24 November 1929

Passengers
- FY2022: 2451
- Rank: 65th

Services
| Preceding station | JR Kyushu | Following station |
|---|---|---|
| Hayato towards Kagoshima | Nippō Main Line | Kirishima-Jingū towards Kokura |
Location
- Location within Kagoshima Prefecture Location within Japan

Kokubu Station (国分駅, Kokubu-eki) is a passenger railway station located in the city of Kirishima, Kagoshima, Japan. It is operated by JR Kyushu and is on the Nippō Main Line.

== Lines ==
The station is served by the Nippō Main Line and is located 432.1 km from the starting point of the line at Kokura.

== Layout ==
The station consists of a side platform and an island platform serving three tracks at grade. Two sidings branch off track 3 with one ending in a vehicle shed. The station building, located on the east side of the tracks, is a modern concrete structure that houses a waiting area, an automatic ticket vending machine and staffed ticket window. Bike sheds and parking are available at the station forecourt. Access to the island platform is by means of a footbridge. Separate from this, another bridge, served by elevators and known as the Kokubu Station East-West Free Passage allows pedestrians to access the streets on both sides of the tracks. Parking is also available at the station forecourt on the west side of tracks.

Management of the passenger facilities at the station has been outsourced to the JR Kyushu Tetsudou Eigyou Co., a wholly owned subsidiary of JR Kyushu specialising in station services. It has a Midori no Madoguchi ticket office.

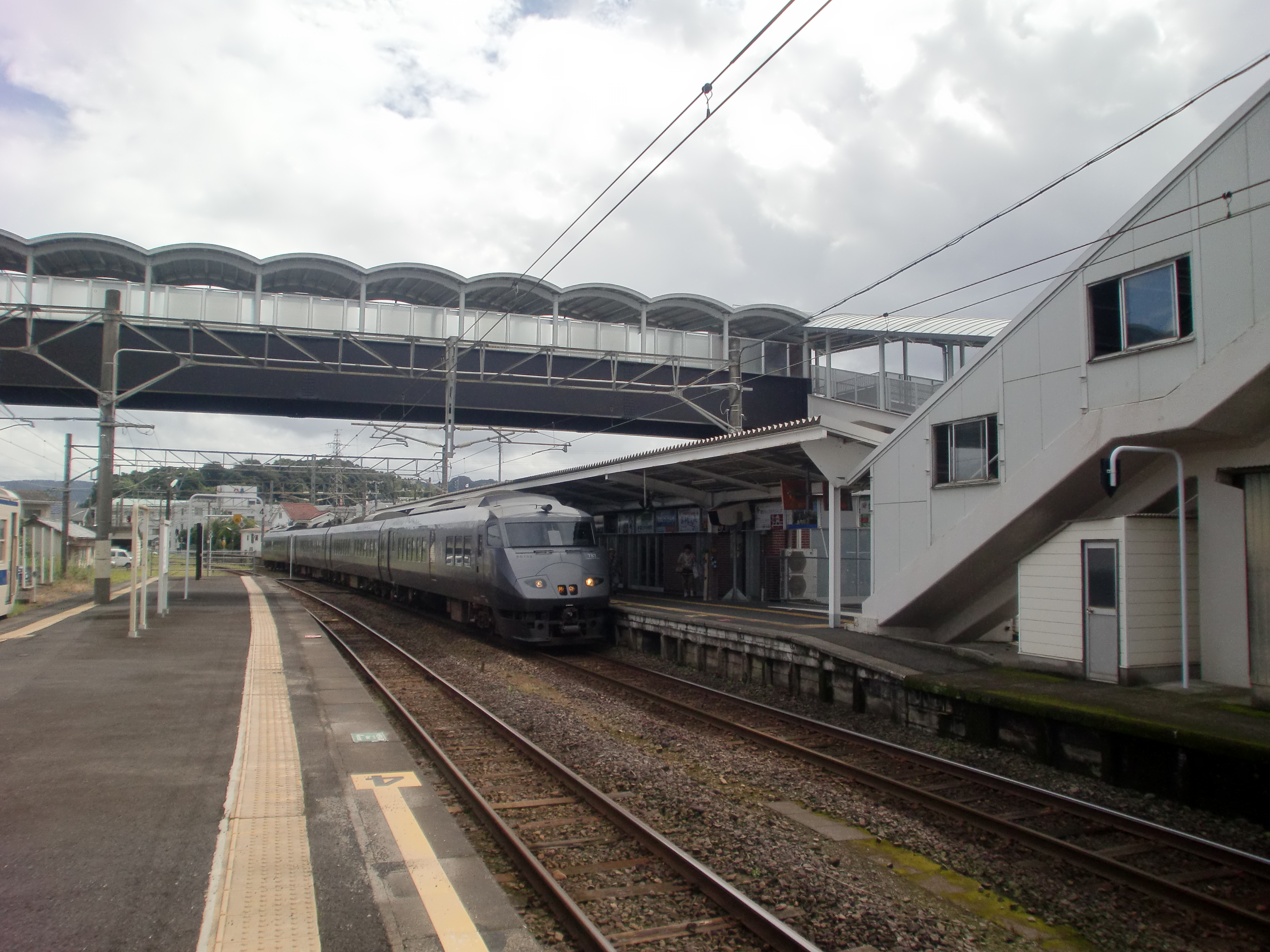
A view of platform 1. The East West Free Passage is ahead, the footbridge to the island platform is to the right.

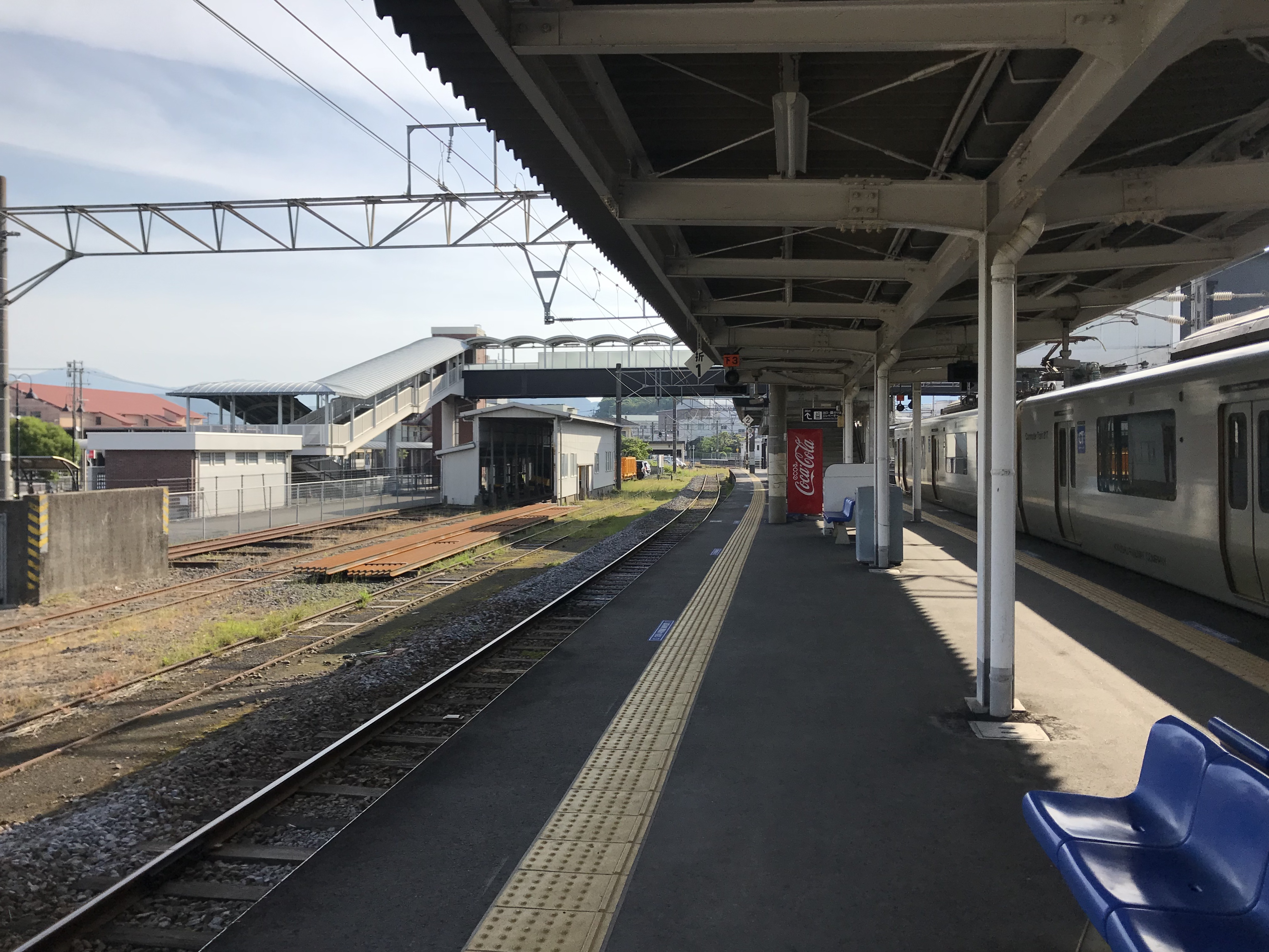
A view of platforms 2 (right) and 3. Further to the left are the sidings and the west exit of the East-West Free Passage.

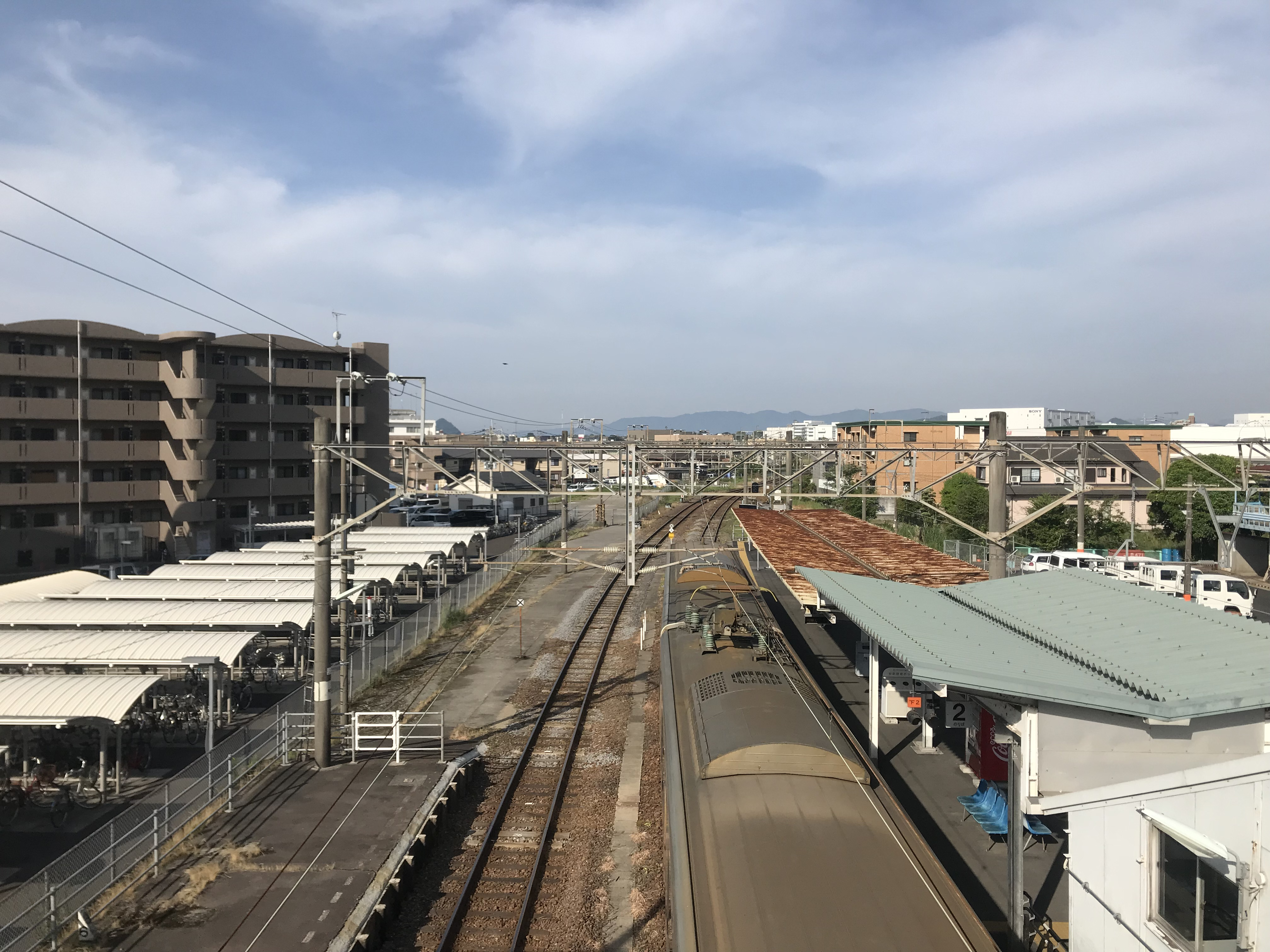
A high-angle view looking south. The bike sheds at the eastern station forecourt are clearly seen.

== Platforms ==
| 1, 2 | ■ ■ Nippō Main Line | for Hayato and Kagoshima-Chūō for Miyakonojō and Miyazaki |
| 3 | ■ ■ Nippō Main Line | for Hayato and Kagoshima-Chūō |

== History ==
The station was opened on 24 November 1929 by Japanese Government Railways (JGR) as the eastern terminus of the then Kokuto-West Line (国都西線) which it had laid from Nishi-Kokubu (now Hayato). It became a through-station on 10 July 1930 when the track was extended further east to Kirishima-Jingū. Subsequently. the Kokuto-West Line was expanded to the east and north, linking up with the Kokuto-East Line at Ōsumi-Ōkawara and other networks so that by the end of 1932, through-traffic had been established between Kokura and Kagoshima. On 6 December 1932, the entire stretch of track from Kokura through Kokubu to Kagoshima was redesignated as the Nippō Main Line. With the privatization of Japanese National Railways (JNR), the successor of JGR, on 1 April 1987, the station came under the control of JR Kyushu.

== Passenger statistics ==
In fiscal 2022, the station was used by an average of 2451 passengers daily (boarding passengers only), and it ranked 65th among the busiest stations of JR Kyushu.

== Surrounding area ==
- Kokubu-Chūō High School
- Kirishima City Hall
- Kokubu Onsen

== See also ==
- List of railway stations in Japan
