= Isoichi Station =

Railway station in Miyakonojō, Miyazaki Prefecture, Japan

Isoichi Station 五十市駅
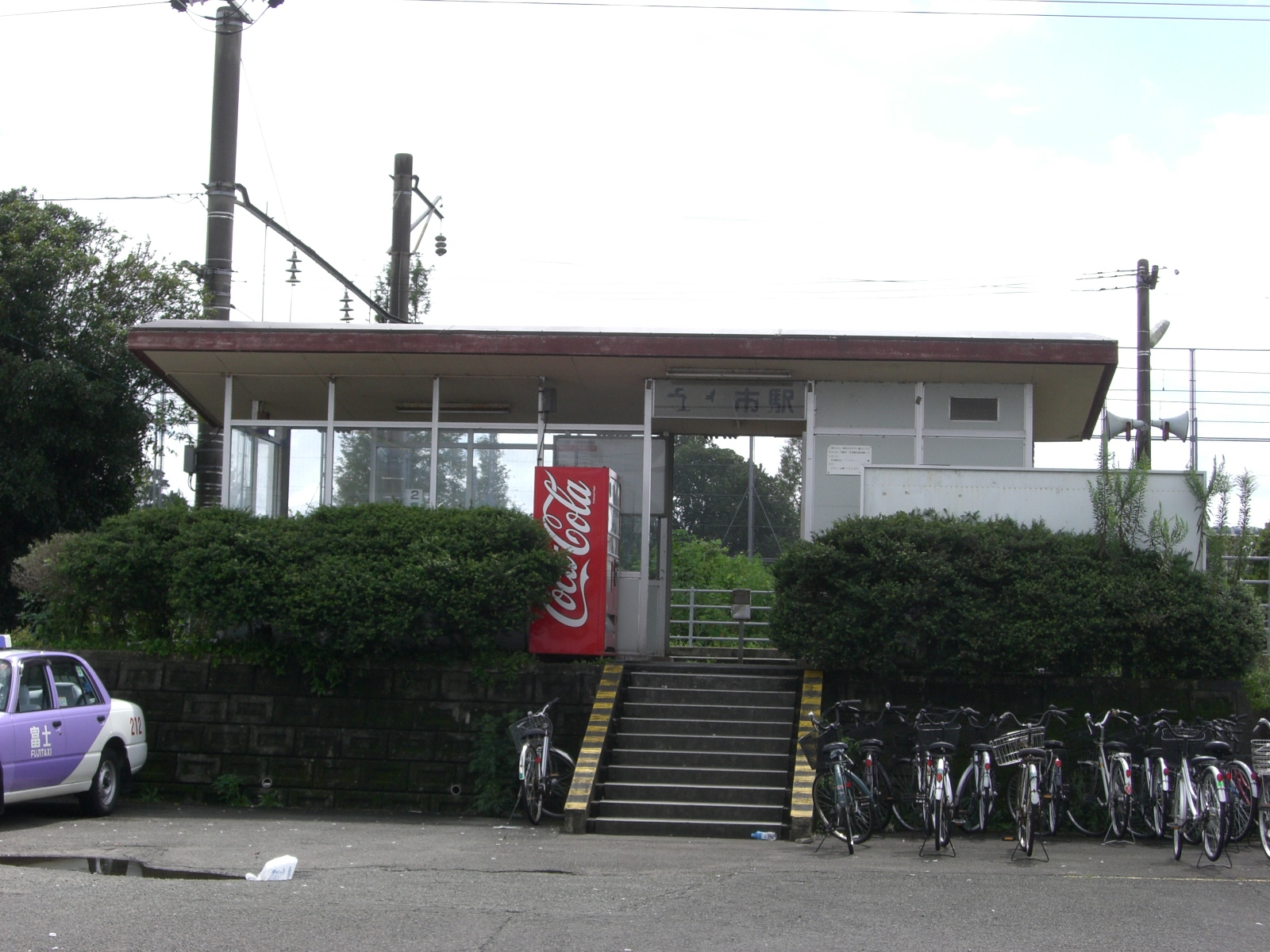
- Isoichi Station in 2007

General information
- Location: Gojitcho, Miyakonojo-shi, Miyazaki-ken 885-0084; Japan
- Coordinates: 31°43′07″N 131°02′01″E
- Operator: JR Kyushu
- Line: ■ Nippō Main Line
- Distance: 395.2 km from Kokura
- Platforms: 2 side platforms
- Tracks: 2 + 1 siding

Construction
- Structure type: At grade
- Accessible: No - platform accessed by footbridge

Other information
- Status: Unstaffed
- Website: Official website

History
- Opened: 28 April 1929

Passengers
- FY2016: 87 daily

Services
Preceding station	JR Kyushu	Following station
Takarabe towards Kagoshima	Nippō Main Line	Nishi-Miyakonojō towards Kokura
Location
- Location within Miyazaki Prefecture Location within Japan

Isoichi Station (五十市駅, Isoichi-eki) is a passenger railway station located in the city of Miyakonojō, Miyazaki, Japan. It is operated by JR Kyushu.

== Lines ==
The station is served by the Nippō Main Line and is located 395.2 km from the starting point of the line at Kokura.

== Layout ==
The station consists of two side platforms serving two tracks with a siding. The station building is a modern, functional structure that is built from glass and steel and is unstaffed- serving only to house a waiting area for passengers. From the access road, it is necessary for visitors to climb a short flight of stairs to enter the station building itself. Getting to the opposite side platform also requires traversing a footbridge.

=== Platforms ===
1	■ ■ Nippō Main Line	for Minami-Miyazaki and Miyazaki
2	■ ■ Nippō Main Line	for Miyakonojō and Kagoshima-Chūō

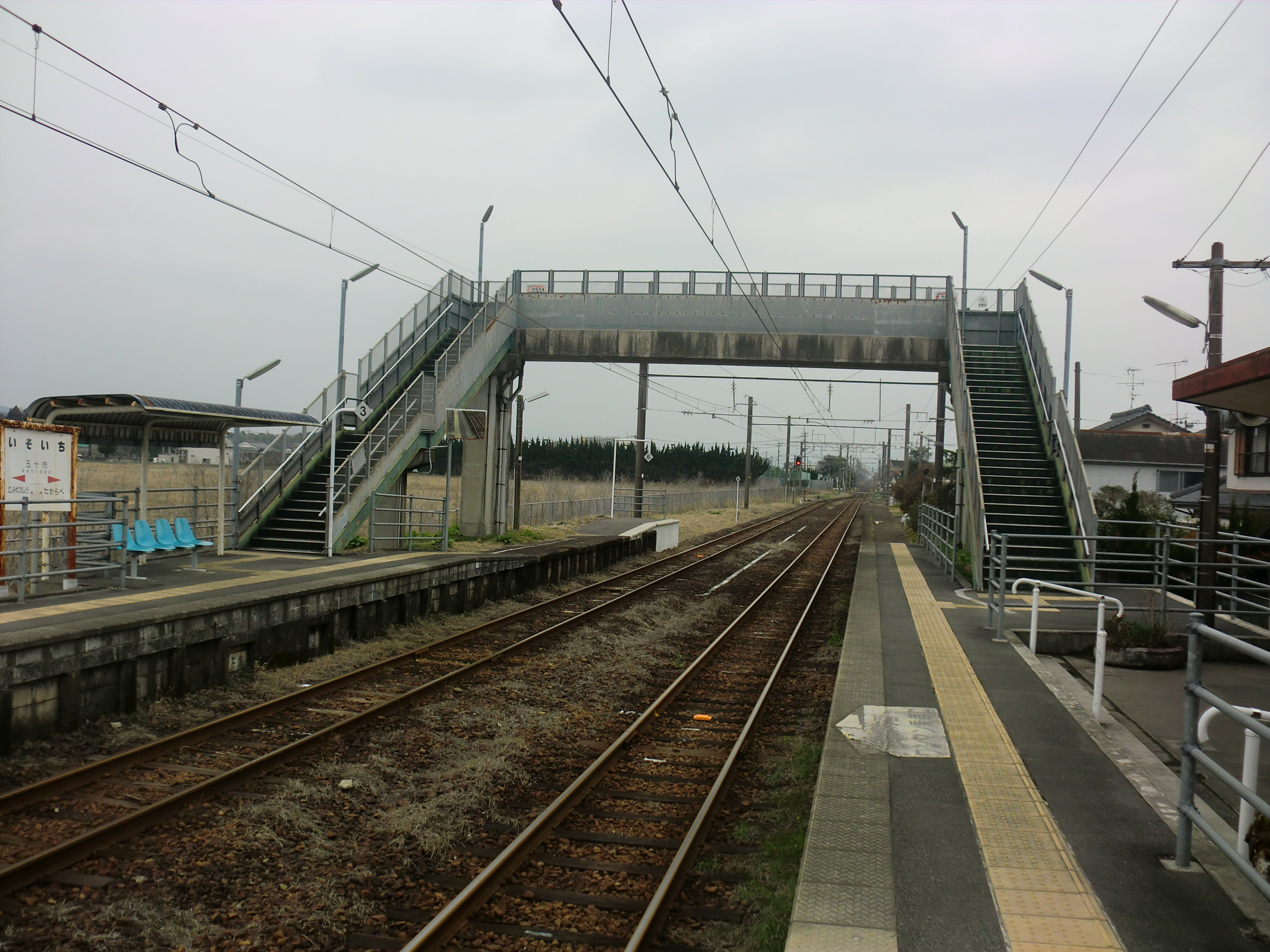
A view of the platforms and tracks.

== History ==
On 28 April 1929, Japanese Government Railways (JGR) opened the Kokuto East Line (国都東線) from Nishi-Miyakonojō to Takarabe. On the same day, Isoichi Station was opened as an intermediate station on the new track. By 1932, the track had been linked up with other networks to the north and south, and through traffic had been established from Kokura, passing through this station onto Kagoshima. The station and the Kokuto East Line were then absorbed and were designated as part of the Nippō Main Line on 6 December 1932. Freight services were discontinued in 1962 and baggage handling in 1979. During the privatization of Japanese National Railways (JNR), the successor of JGR, which occurred on 1 April 1987, the station came under the control of JR Kyushu.

== Passenger statistics ==
In the 2016 fiscal year, the station was used by an average of 87 passengers (boarding only) per day.

== Surrounding area ==
- Miyakonojo City Meiwa Elementary School
- Miyakonojo City Isoichi Elementary School
- Miyakonojo City Isoichi Junior High School

== See also ==
- List of railway stations in Japan
