= Ōsumi-Ōkawara Station =

Railway station in Soo, Kagoshima Prefecture, Japan

Ōsumi-Ōkawara Station 大隅大川原駅
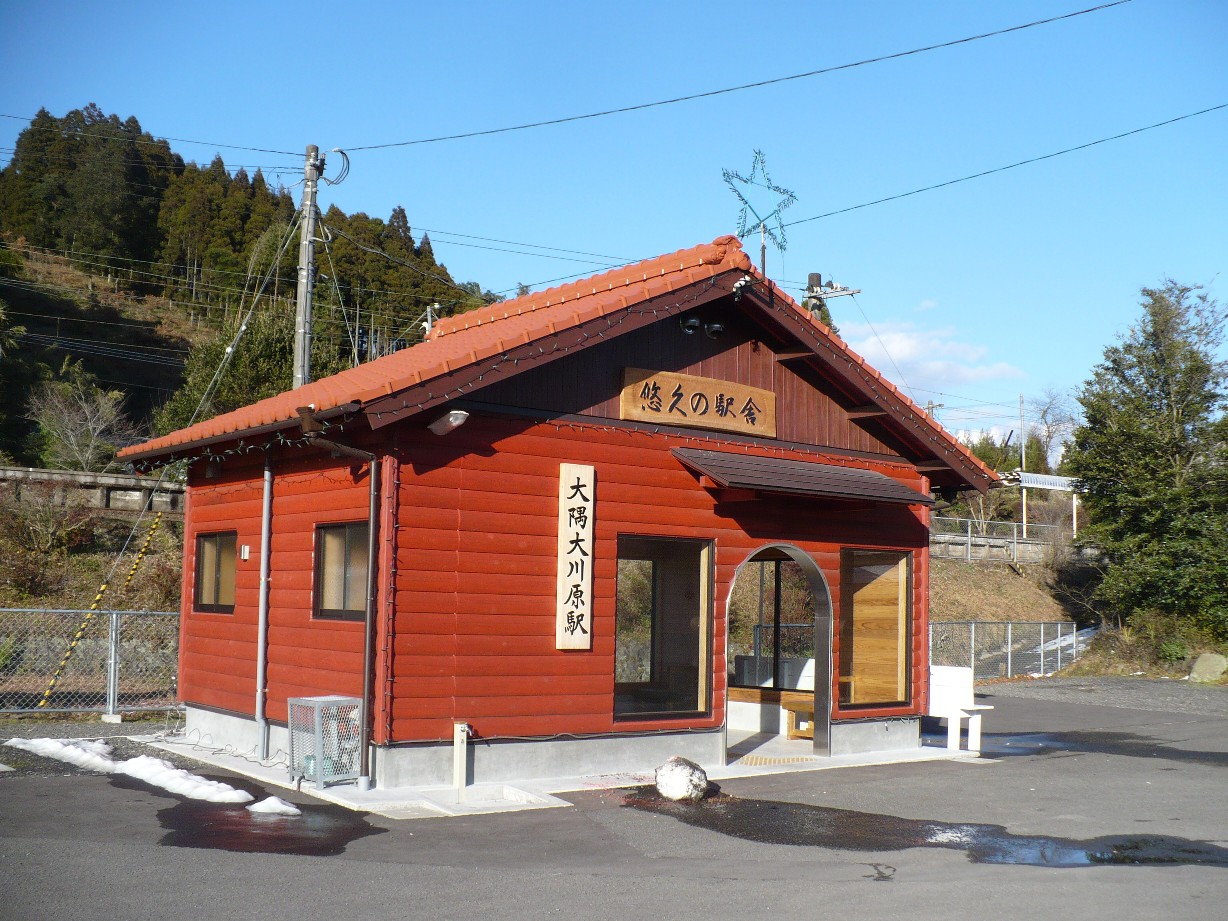
- Ōsumi-Ōkawara Station in 2011

General information
- Location: Takarabechō-Shimotakarabe, Soo-shi, Kagoshima-ken 899-4103; Japan
- Coordinates: 31°46′22″N 130°55′28″E
- Operator: JR Kyushu
- Line: ■ Nippō Main Line
- Distance: 408.1 km from Kokura
- Platforms: 1 island platform
- Tracks: 2 + 1 siding

Construction
- Structure type: Low embankment
- Accessible: No - island platform accessed by footbridge

Other information
- Status: Unstaffed
- Website: Official website

History
- Opened: 1 November 1931
- Rebuilt: 2010

Passengers
- FY2015: 14

Services
Preceding station	JR Kyushu	Following station
Kita-Naganoda towards Kagoshima	Nippō Main Line	Kitamata towards Kokura
Location
- Location within Kagoshima Prefecture Location within Japan

Ōsumi-Ōkawara Station (大隅大川原駅, Ōsumi-Ōkawara-eki) is a passenger railway station located in the city of Soo, Kagoshima, Japan. It is operated by JR Kyushu and is on the Nippō Main Line.

== Lines ==
The station is served by the Nippō Main Line and is located 408.1 km from the starting point of the line at Kokura.

== Layout ==
The station has no staffs and consists of an island platform serving two tracks with a siding, all on a low embankment. The station building, located at the base of the embankment, is a modern structure built in 2010 that resembles a log cabin. From there, a short walk up to a sloped access road leads to a footbridge which is used to access the island platform.

== Platforms ==
1	■ ■ Nippō Main Line	for Hayato and Kagoshima
2	■ ■ Nippō Main Line	for Miyakonojō and Miyazaki

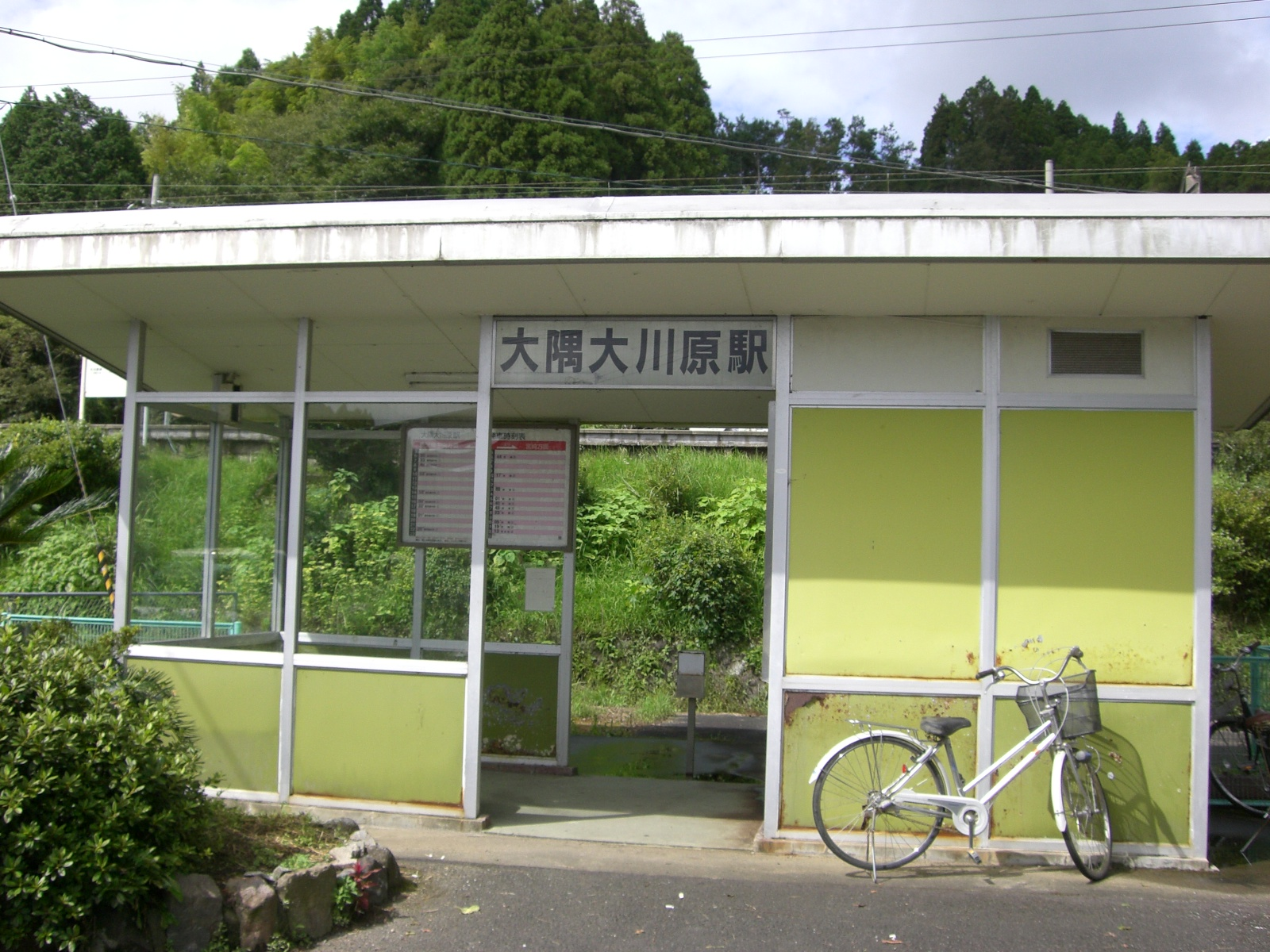
The old station building. This was replaced in 2010.

== History ==
The station was opened on 1 November 1931 by Japanese Government Railways (JGR) as the southern terminus of the then Kokuto East Line (国都東線) from Nishi-Miyakonojō. By 1932, the Kokuto East Line had been linked up with other networks north and south, and through traffic had been established from Kokura, through this station to Kagoshima. The station and the Kokuto East Line were then absorbed and designated as part of the Nippō Main Line on 6 December 1932. With the privatization of Japanese National Railways (JNR), the successor of JGR, on 1 April 1987, the station came under the regulation of JR Kyushu.

In 2010, new improvements were made by the local municipal authorities, in the form of building a new station and opening a public toilet. The structure was made out of local cedar wood in log cabin style and given the nickname "The Eternal Station Building".

== Passenger statistics ==
In the fiscal year of 2015, the station was used by an average of 14 passengers daily.

== Surrounding area ==
- Okawara Post Office

== See also ==
- List of railway stations in Japan
