= Nishi-Miyakonojō Station =

Railway station in Miyakonojō, Miyazaki Prefecture, Japan

Nishi-Miyakonojō Station 西都城駅
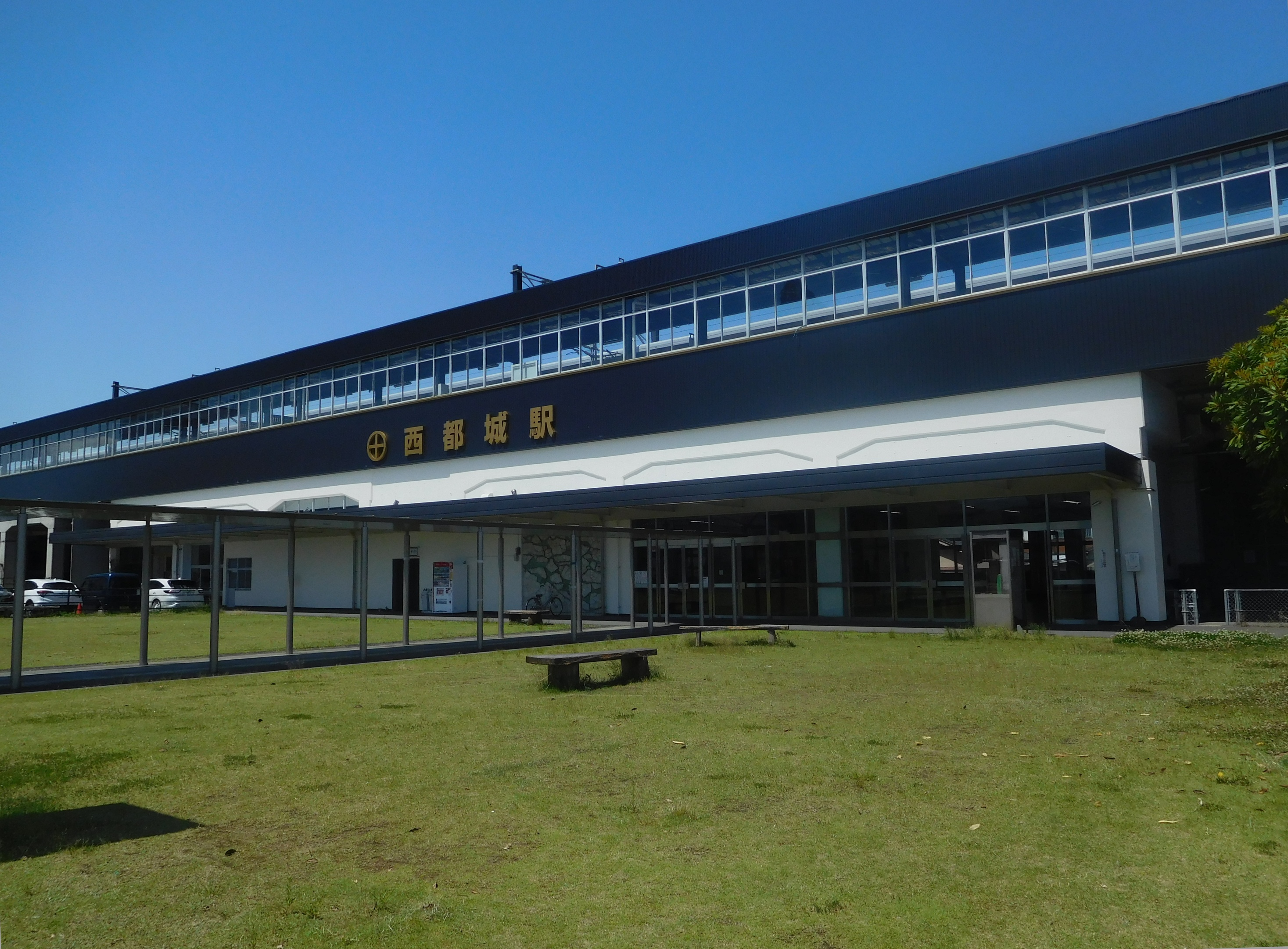
- Nishi-Miyakonojō in May 2018

General information
- Location: 1-1 Matsumotocho, Miyakonojo-shi, Miyazaki-ken 885-0077; Japan
- Coordinates: 31°43′24″N 131°03′25″E
- Operator: JR Kyushu
- Line: ■ Nippō Main Line
- Distance: 392.4 km from Kokura
- Platforms: 1 side + 1 island platforms
- Tracks: 3

Construction
- Structure type: Elevated
- Accessible: No - platform accessed by stairs

Other information
- Status: Staffed
- Website: Official website

History
- Opened: 14 January 1923

Passengers
- FY2016: 449 daily

Services
Preceding station	JR Kyushu	Following station
Isoichi towards Kagoshima	Nippō Main Line	Miyakonojō towards Kokura
Location
- Location within Miyazaki Prefecture Location within Japan

Nishi-Miyakonojō Station (西都城駅, Nishi-Miyakonojō-eki) is a passenger railway station located in the city of Miyakonojō, Miyazaki, Japan. It is operated by JR Kyushu.

== Lines ==
The station is served by the Nippō Main Line and is located 392.4 km from the starting point of the line at Kokura.

== Layout ==
The station consists of an elevated station side platform and an island platform, with the station building is located under the elevated tracks. Most of the station building is a wide concourse with exits and ticket gates at one end. The station building also has the remains of a waiting area that was closed off. In the direction of Kokubu, an elevated bridge with no tracks branches off to the south, but this is the ruins of the Shibushi Line, which was in operation until 1987. The viaduct branches off and immediately ends, and the area beyond has been converted into a residential area. Until March 2023, JR Kyushu Service Support was a subcontracted station with station operations, and from April of the same year, the station was transferred to Miyazaki Kotsu. There is a ticket office.The station building was renovated in October 2017, and the exterior was changed to white and black as the main colors, and the station name displayed in gold letters, with the Miyakonojo Shimazu clan's family emblem. The station is not a barrier-free design, and the only way to move between the concourse and the platform is by stairs.

=== Platforms ===
1	■ ■ Nippō Main Line	for Hayato and Kagoshima-Chūō
2, 3	■ ■ Nippō Main Line	for Minami-Miyazaki and Miyazaki

== History ==
The station was opened on 14 January 1923, as a station on the Japanese Government Railways (JGR) Shibushi Line. On 6 December 1932 the area between Miyakonojo and Nishi-Miyakonojō stations on the Shibushi Line was incorporated into the Nippō Main Line. The station building was destroyed by air raids on 6 August 1945 during World War II. Freight services were discontinued in 1976. The tracks were elevated in 1979. During the privatization of Japanese National Railways (JNR), the successor of JGR, which occurred on 1 April 1987, the station came under the control of JR Kyushu.

== Passenger statistics ==
In the 2016 fiscal year, the station was used by an average of 449 passengers (boarding only) per day.

== Surrounding area ==
- Miyakonojo City Hall
- Miyakonojo Joint Government Building
- Miyakonojo Shimazu Residence
- Miyakonojo City Museum of Art
- Miyakonojo History Museum

== See also ==
- List of railway stations in Japan
