= Hyotan Onsen =

Onsen facility in Oita Prefecture, Japan

Coordinates: 33°18′52″N 131°28′46″E

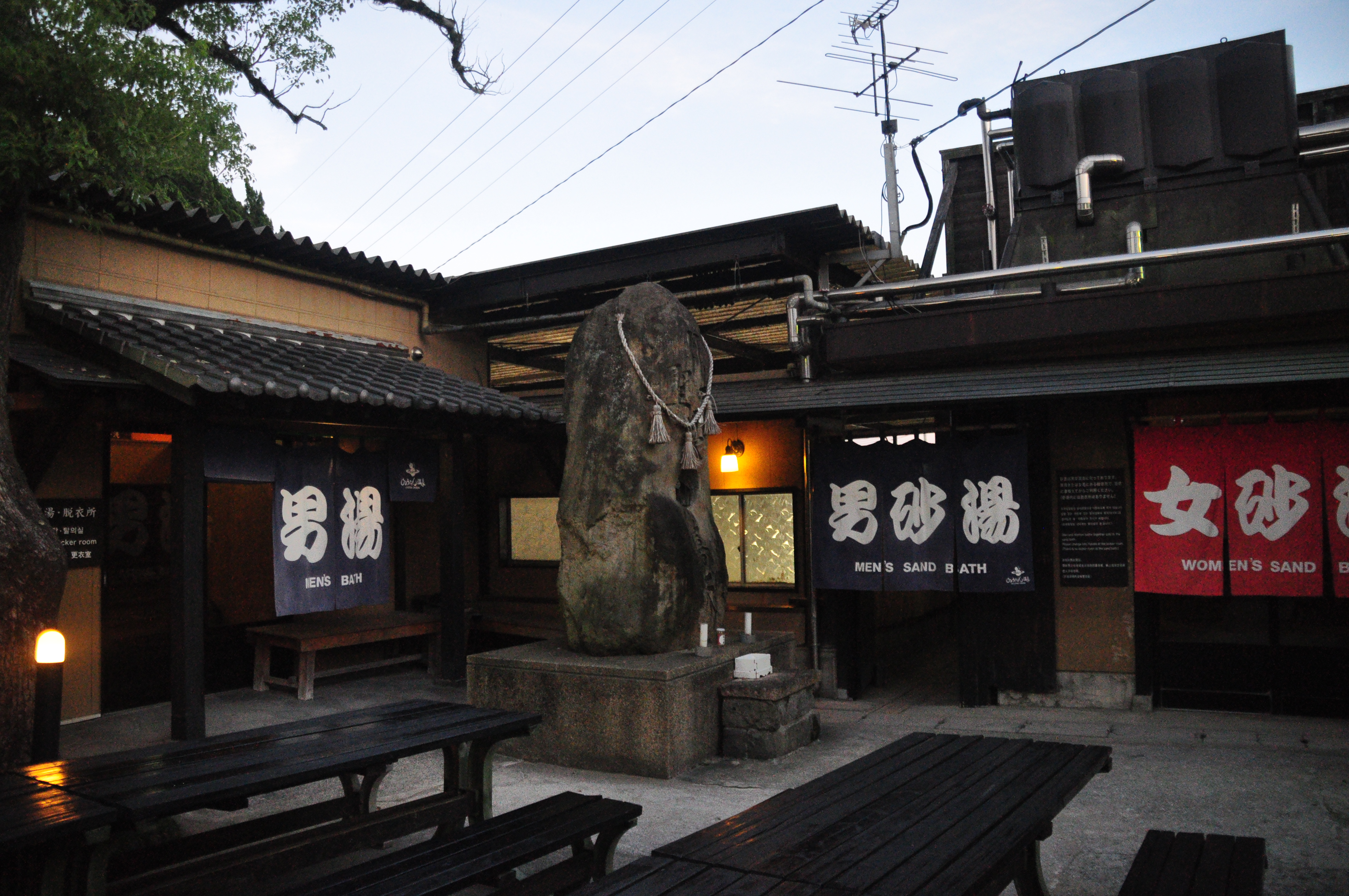
Noren marking the entrances to bathing areas at Hyotan Onsen

Hyotan Onsen (ひょうたん温泉) is a large onsen bathing facility located in Kannawa, Beppu, Ōita Prefecture. Opened in 1922, Hyotan Onsen is notable for being the only onsen facility in Japan to have received three Michelin Stars from Michelin Green Guides Japan.

== History ==
It is said that Hyotan Onsen's founder, Junsaku, dug out the onsen in the geothermally active Beppu Hatto area so that the spring could help heal his wife's rheumatism. The first bath was created with stones in the shape of a gourd (hyōtan in Japanese), giving the onsen its name. The original gourd-shaped stone bath still exists in the women's bathing area. Junsaku chose the shape because Toyotomi Hideyoshi, the 16th century samurai daimyo whom he admired, used the shape of a gourd on his flags.

In 1927, an 18-meter-high, seven-story observation deck was constructed in the shape of a gourd. It remained until 1945 at which time it was destroyed due to fears that it would be used as a target for air raids.

== Facilities ==
Hyotan Onsen has two large bathing areas separated by gender. Both areas feature a variety of baths including a large outdoor bath (露天風呂, roten-buro), several indoor baths (including the original stone hyōtan bath in the women's bathing area), and waterfall baths called utase-yu (打たせ湯). The naturally heated water is first cooled by a bamboo cooling system to a temperature comfortable for bathing. There are also steam saunas in each bathing area.

Separate from the nude bathing areas is the sand bath (砂湯, suna-yu) area. In the sand baths, visitors can lie down on and cover themselves in heated sand. As visitors wear yukata in the sand baths, the area is mixed gender.

There are 14 "family baths" (家族風呂, kazoku-buro) that can be reserved and used for private bathing.
