= Hells of Beppu =

Hot springs area in Beppu, Japan

Coordinates: 33°18′58″N 131°28′8″E

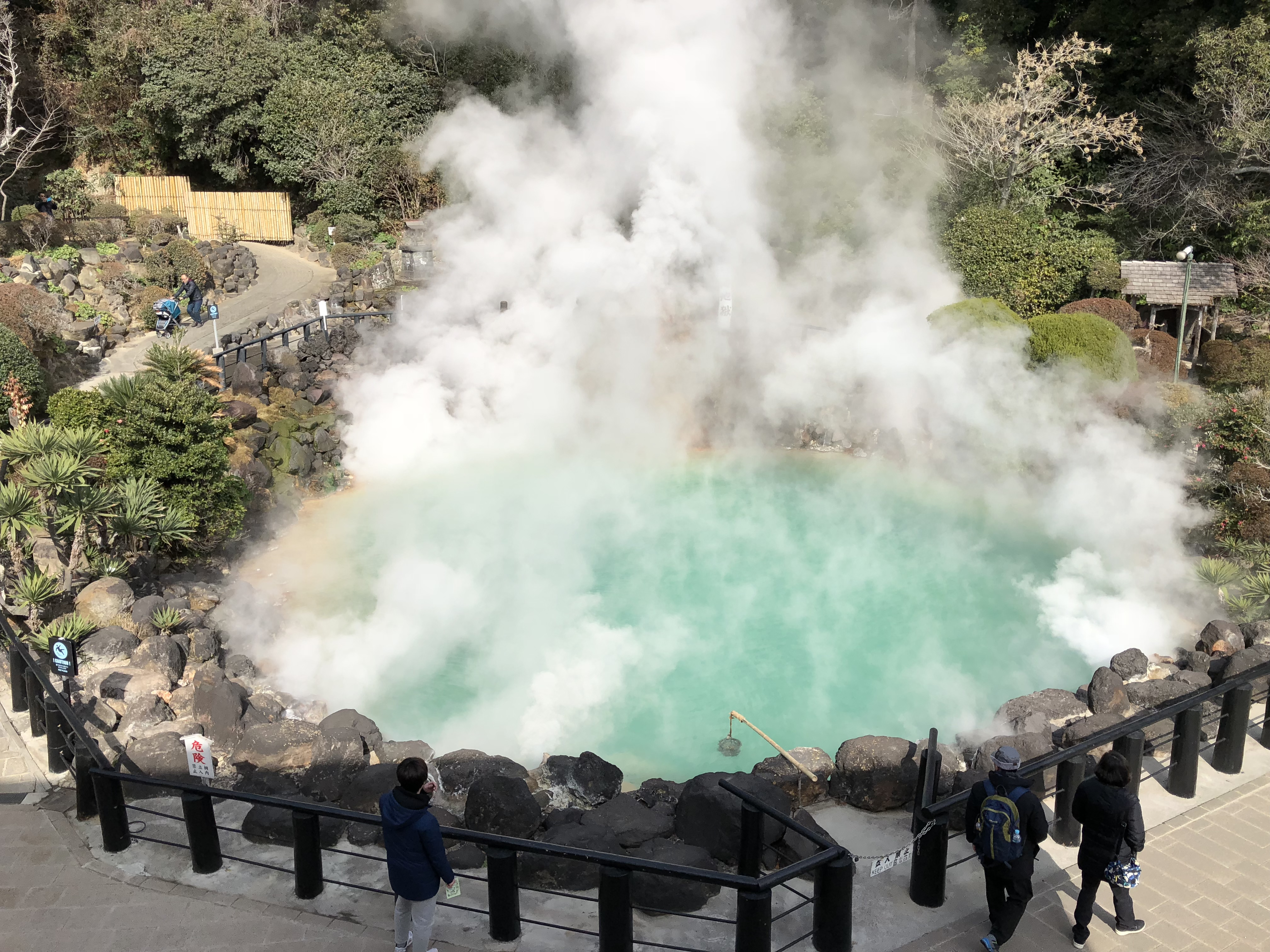
Aerial view of Umi Jigoku or "Sea Hell"

The hot spring system Hells of Beppu (別府の地獄, Beppu no jigoku) is a nationally designated "Place of Scenic Beauty" in the onsen town of Beppu, Ōita, Japan. The "hells," or "jigoku" (地獄) in Japanese, are for viewing rather than bathing.

== Hells of the Beppu Jigoku Meguri ==
The tourist course which includes all of the seven hells is called Beppu Jigoku Meguri (別府地獄めぐり). Five of the hells are within walking distance of the starting point (Sea Hell) and two of them should be accessed by car or bus. The entire course takes about two to two and a half hours to complete.

=== Sea Hell ===
The "Sea Hell" (海地獄, Umi Jigoku) is known for its vibrant blue-colored water. The water, which is 98 degrees Celsius, is used to boil onsen tamago (or "onsen eggs"). This is the starting point of the Jigoku Meguri tour.

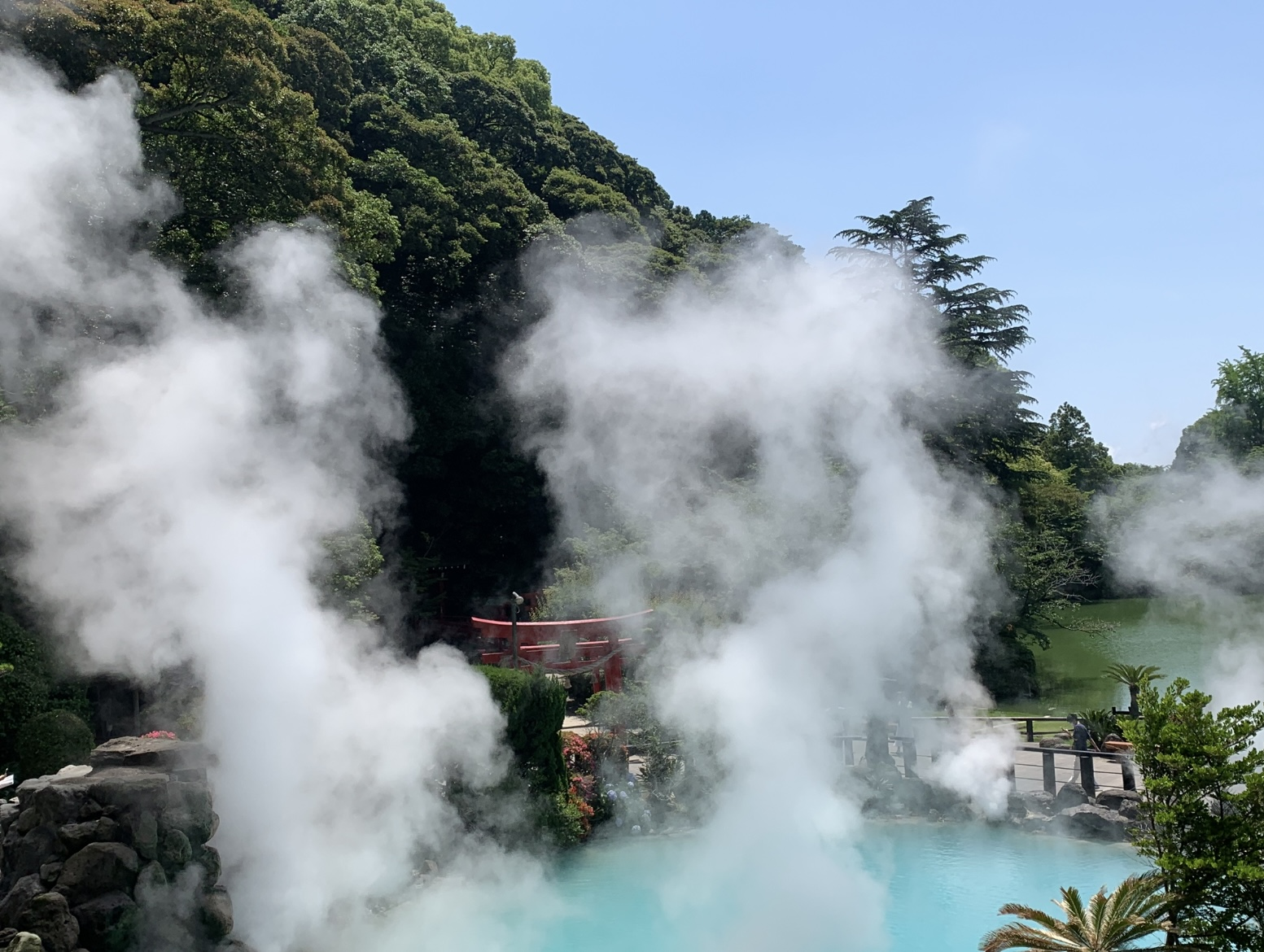
The cobalt-blue Sea Hell

=== Oniishibozu Hell ===
This hell consists of ponds of boiling gray mud. It is referred to as the "Oniishibozu Hell" (鬼石坊主地獄, Oniishibozu Jigoku) due to the bubbles of mud resembling the bald head of a Buddhist monk (Bōzu means Buddhist monk in Japanese).

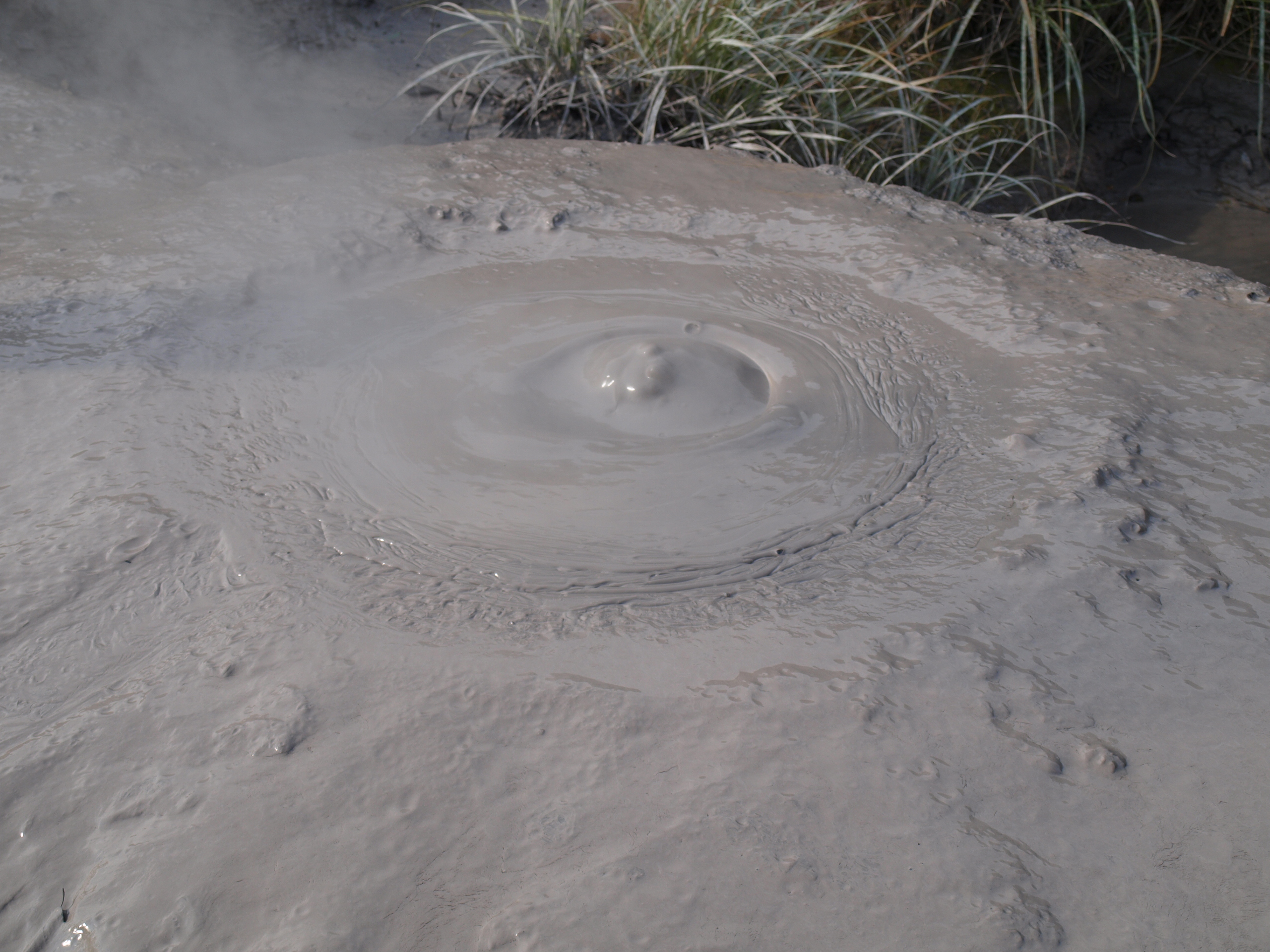
Boiling mud of the Oniishibozu Hell which is said to resemble a monk's bald head

=== Kamado Hell ===
Kamado Hell (かまど地獄, Kamado Jigoku) or "Furnace Hell" has a variety of hells with one of them changing color depending on the temperature and weather.

=== Crocodile Hell ===
Oniyama Jigoku (鬼山地獄), often called "Crocodile Hell," contains about 80 crocodiles. It was the first crocodile breeding facility in Japan, and the heat of the hells creates a suitable habitat for the crocodiles.

=== Shiraike Hell ===
Shiraike Jigoku (白池地獄) literally means "white pond hell." The water of this hell is light blue and located next to a tropical fish aquarium. The steam of the hell allows the aquarium to hold fish such as pirarucus and piranhas.

=== Chinoike Hell ===
Chinoike Jigoku (血の池地獄) literally means "blood pond hell." The name comes from its red-colored hot mud. It is the oldest natural hell in Japan. This hell is about 10 minutes by bus or car from the previous hells.

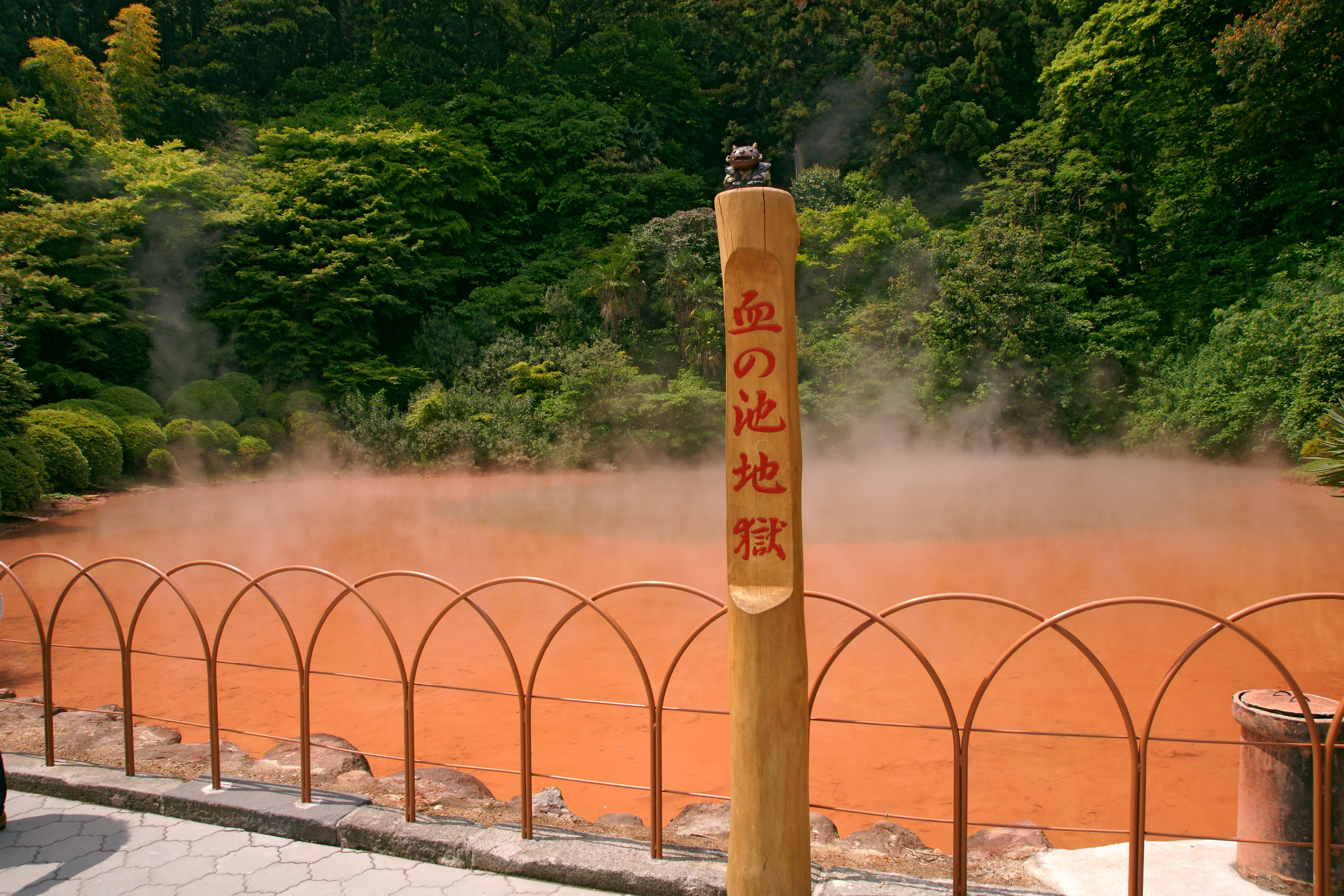
Chinoike Hell named for its blood-like color

=== Tatsumaki Hell ===
Tatsumaki Jigoku (龍巻地獄), which means "tornado hell," is the only of the hells which is a geyser. It erupts every 30-40 minutes. A roof was installed over the geyser to allow spectators to watch the eruption from a close distance. Without the roof, the geyser would reach 30 meters into the air. This hell is located next to the Chinoike Hell.

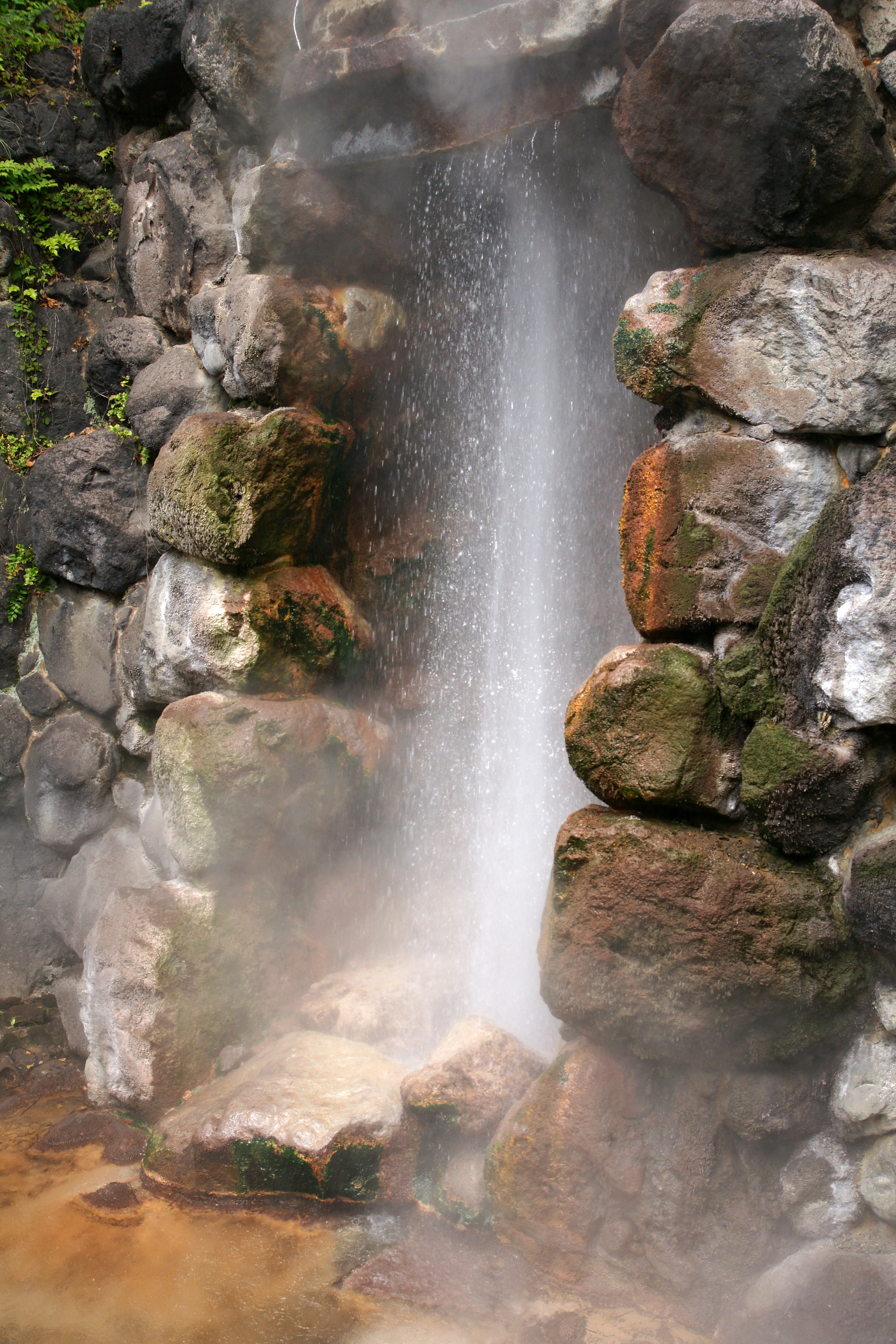
Tatsumaki Hell erupting

== See also ==
- Beppu Onsen
