= Tachū Naitō =

Japanese architect, engineer, and professor

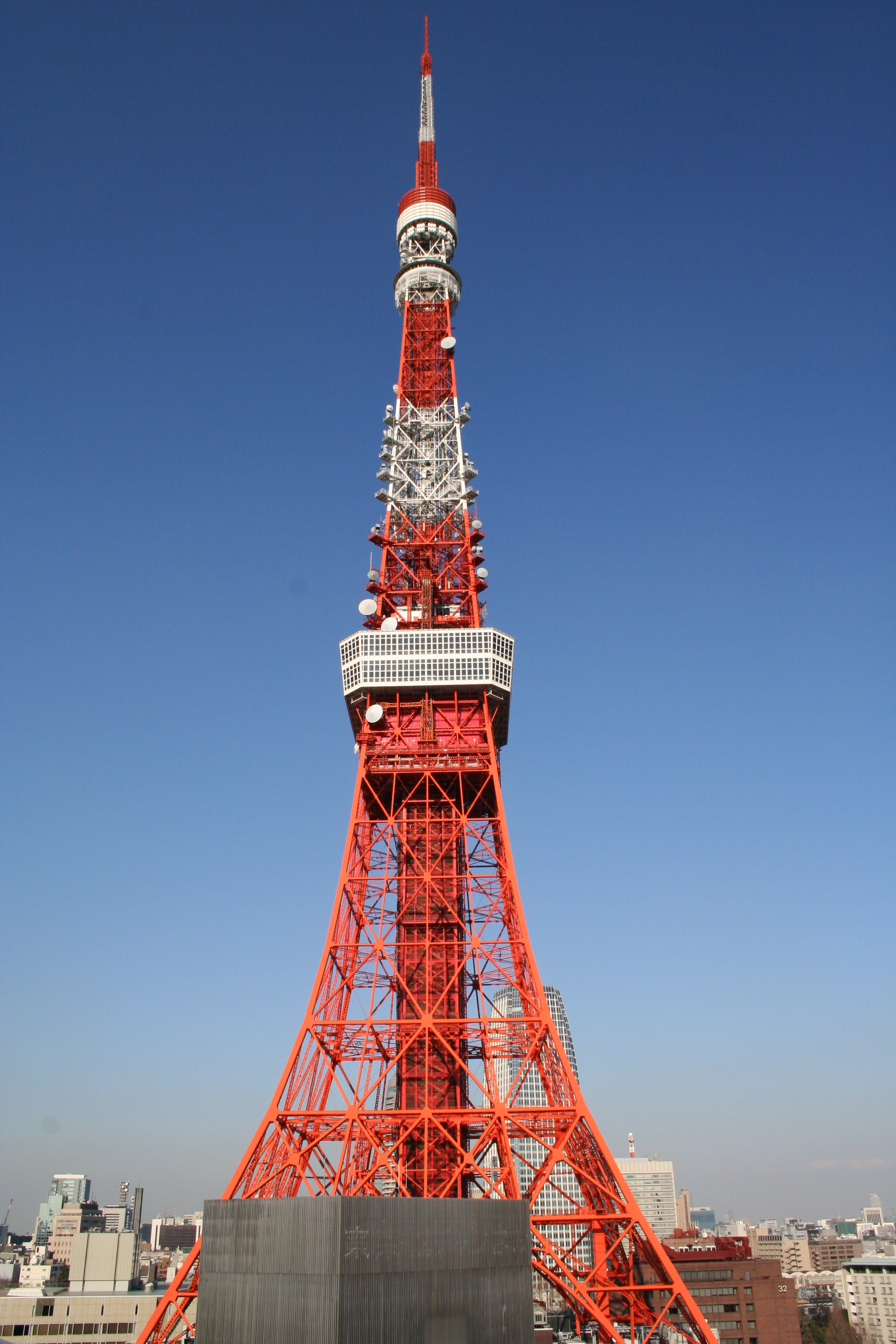
Tokyo Tower

Tachū Naitō (内藤 多仲, Naitō Tachū; 12 June 1886 – 25 August 1970) was a Japanese architect, engineer, and professor. He was a father of earthquake-proof design and built many broadcasting and observation towers, including the Tokyo Tower.

== Biography ==
Naitō was born on 12 June 1886, in Minami-Alps, Yamanashi Prefecture.

Naitō attended the Old System Kofu Middle School (presently Yamanashi Prefectural Kofu First High School), he passed high school, then attended the Tokyo Imperial University (presently the University of Tokyo). Naitō started out studying naval architecture, but then turned to architecture due to the shipbuilding depression after the Russo-Japanese War. He studied with Sano Toshikata and graduated in 1910. In 1913, he became a professor at Waseda University.

In 1916, he went to America as an international student where he devised his seismic theory of the earthquake-proof wall. While on the First transcontinental railroad, he made observations about the movements of the luggage depending on the trains acceleration after noticing the scattered trunks when the train made sudden stops. The lack of partitions in the luggage compartment and the disarray of the trunks led him to the structural idea of the earthquake-proof wall, effectively a shear wall.

Using the seismic structural theory that he devised, he engineered the Industrial Bank of Japan's main office which was designed by Setsu Watanabe. Three months after the building's completion in 1923, the Great Kantō earthquake happened. This structure withstood the damage and Naitō included this fact in his lectures as the effectiveness of his earthquake-proof design theory had been proven.

Other than the Industrial Bank of Japan, he worked on the Kabuki-za and the Okuma auditorium. Naitō designed many broadcasting towers as well, the Nagoya TV Tower in 1954, the Tsutenkaku in 1956, the Sapporo TV Tower and Beppu Tower in 1957, and the Tokyo Tower in 1958.

Naitō held many positions and was recognized with many awards throughout his career. In 1938, he became the chairman of the Japan Welding Society. In 1941 he was named the chair of the Architectural Institute of Japan and in 1954 became a member of the Science Council of Japan. Naitō became a member of the Japan Academy in 1960 and he was awarded a distinction for cultural merit in 1962 and the second-class Order of the Rising Sun in 1964.

On August 25, 1970 at 9:05 AM, Tachū Naitō died in the National Tokyo First Hospital, now the International Medical Center of Japan, at 84 years of age. His remains were buried in the graveyard of the Naitō family in Tamareien Cemetery. His epitaph is on the right side, and a bronze statue is on the left.

== Gallery ==
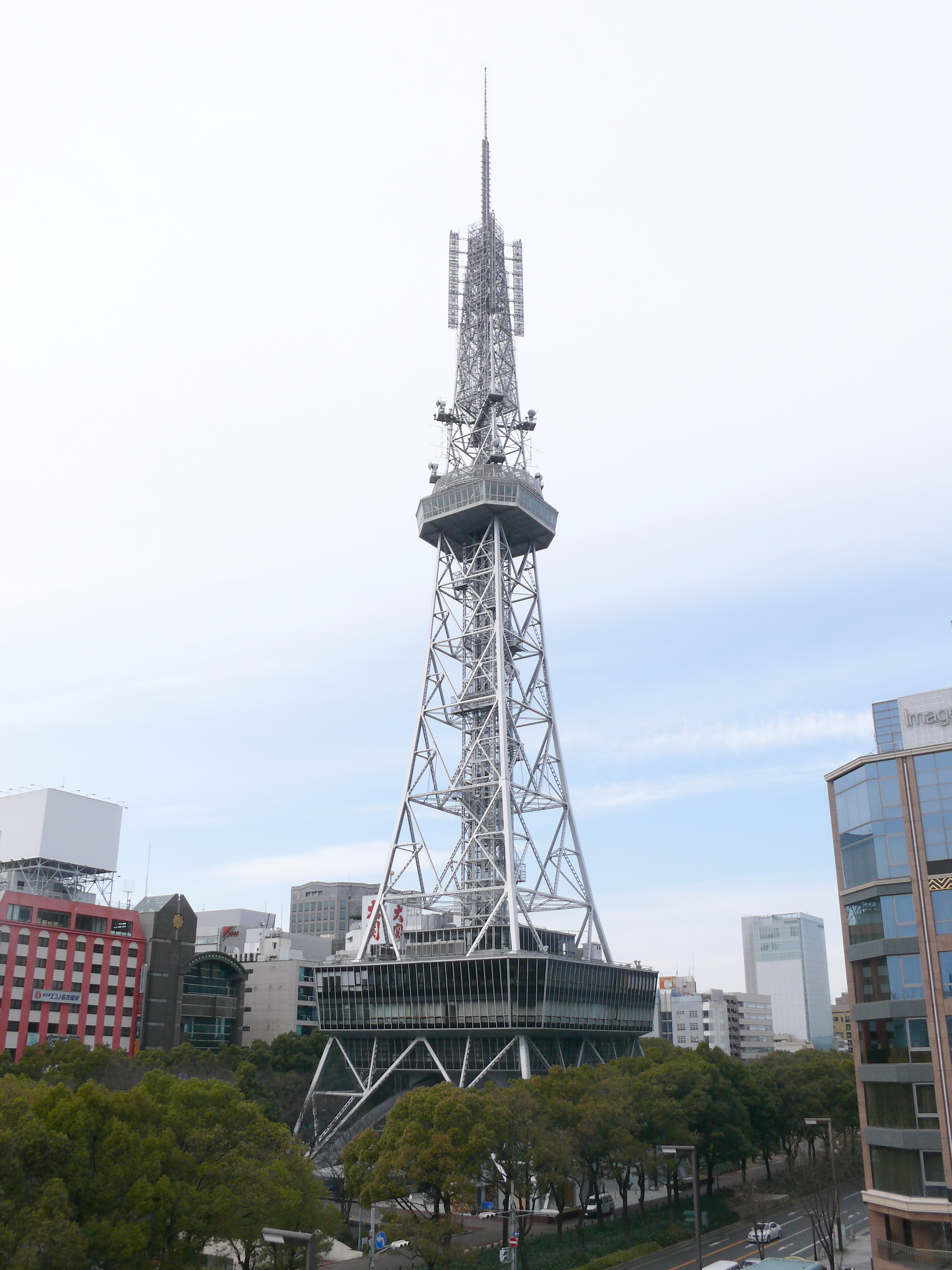
Nagoya TV Tower (1954)

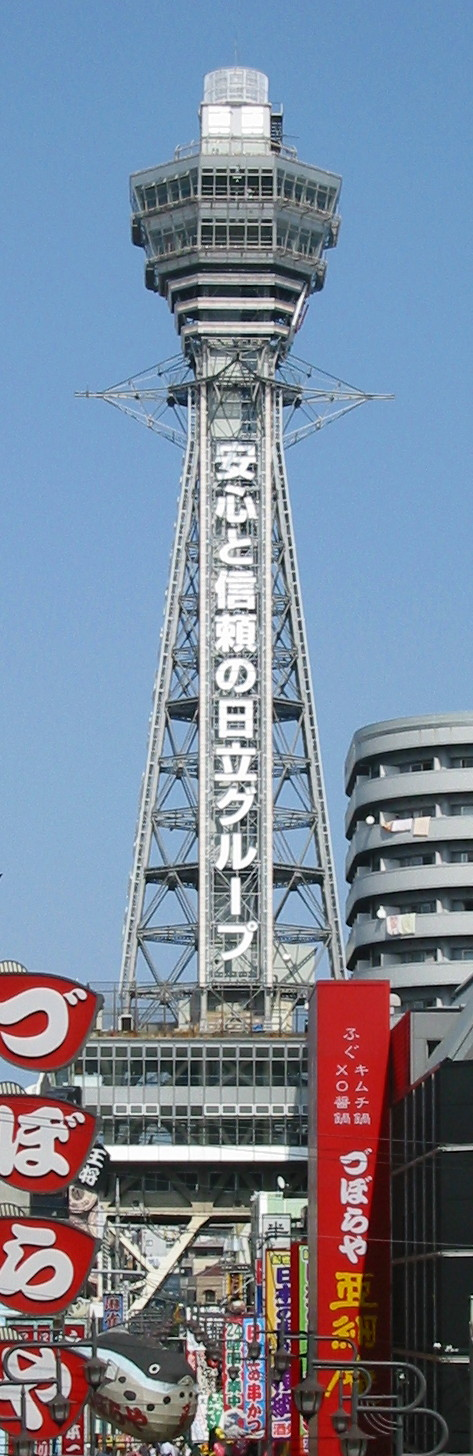
Tsutenkaku (1956)

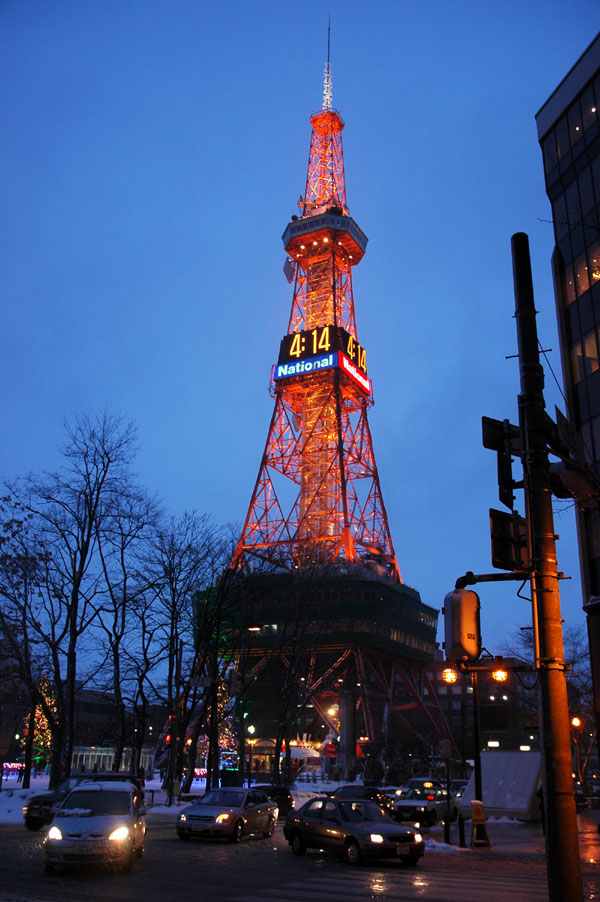
Sapporo TV Tower (1957)

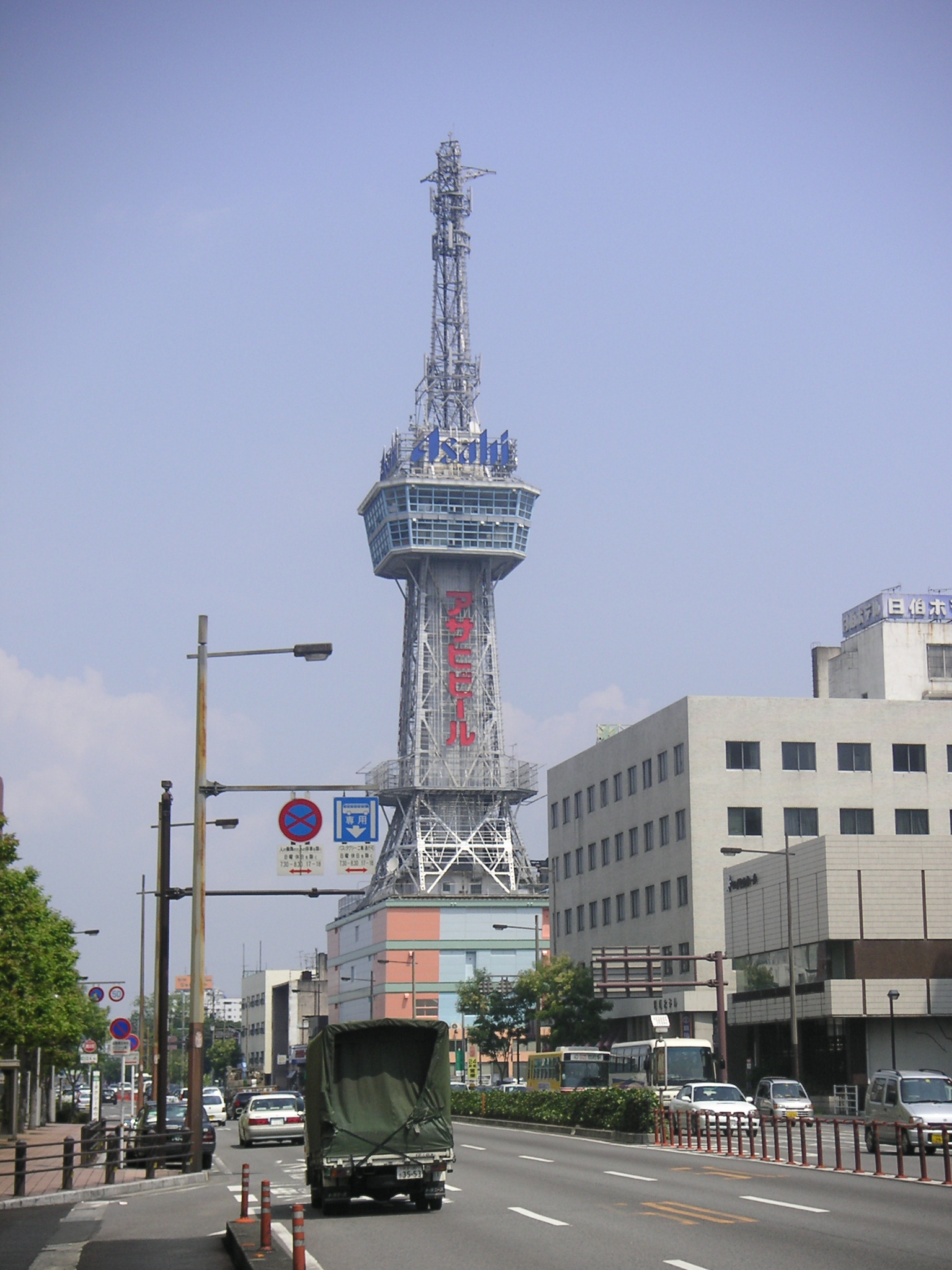
Beppu Tower (1957)
