= Kankaiji Onsen =

Thermal spring

Coordinates: 33°17′0.7″N 131°28′32.6″E

Kankaiji onsen (観海寺温泉) is a natural hot spring located near Beppu, Japan. The waters of this hot spring are channels to several bathing resorts and is one of the most popular tourist destinations in its locale.
