= Beppu =

Beppu 別府市
- City
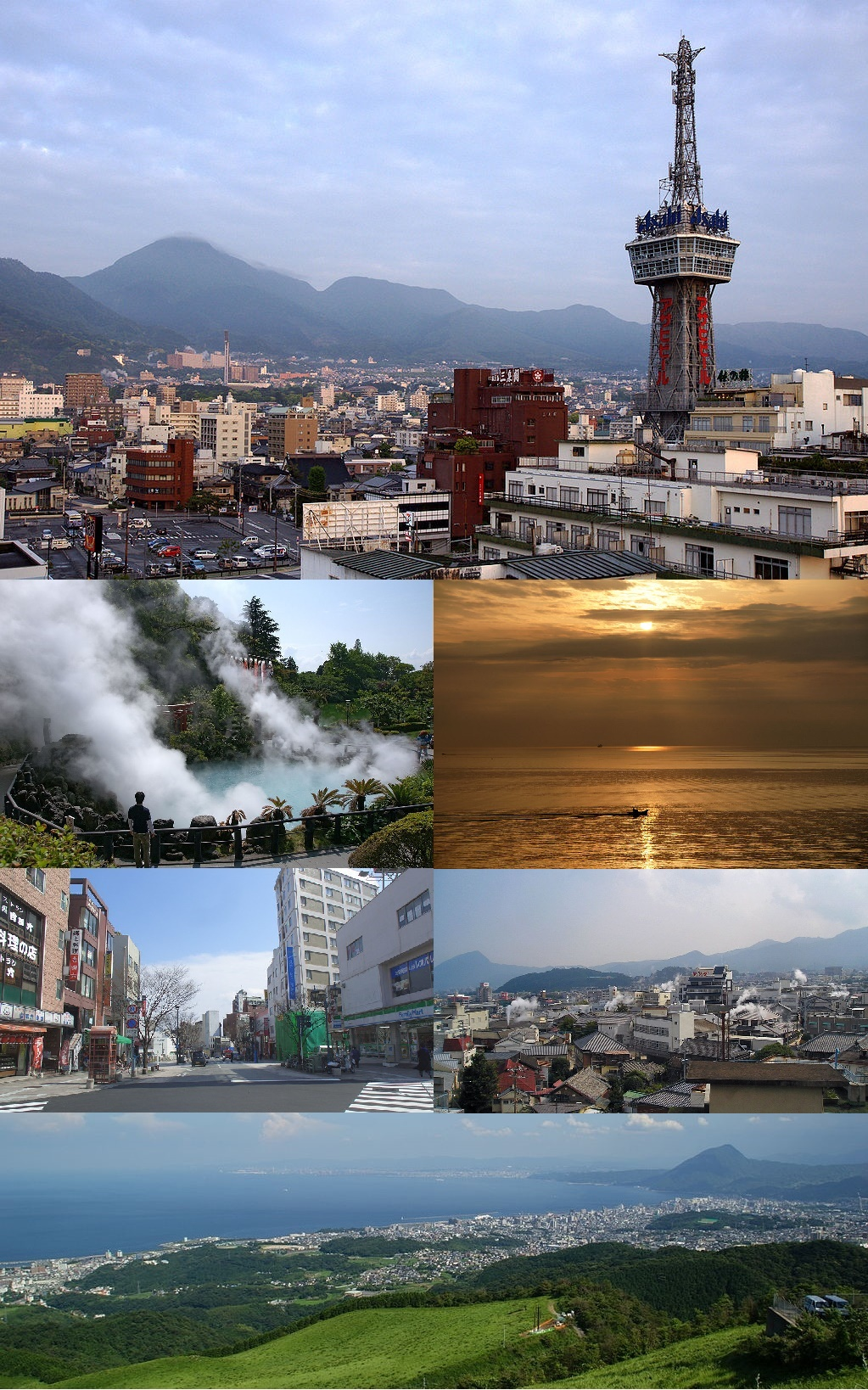
Beppu Onsen・Beppu Tower and Mount Tsurumi
Umi-Jigoku	Beppu Port
View from Beppu Station	Kannawa Onsen
Jumonjibara
- Flag Emblem
- Interactive map of Beppu
- Location in Japan
- Coordinates: 33°17′05″N 131°29′29″E
- Country: Japan
- Region: Kyushu
- Prefecture: Ōita

Government
  - Mayor: Yasuhiro Nagano

Area
  - Total: 125.34 km^{2} (48.39 sq mi)

Population (November 30, 2023)
  - Total: 113,045
  - Density: 901.91/km^{2} (2,335.9/sq mi)
- Time zone: UTC+09:00 (JST)
- City hall address: 1-15 Kaminoguchi-chō, Beppu-shi, Ōita-ken 874-8511
- Website: Official website
- Symbols
- Flower: Ōmurasaki (Rhododendron x pulchrum)
- Tree: Sweet Osmanthus and camphor laurel

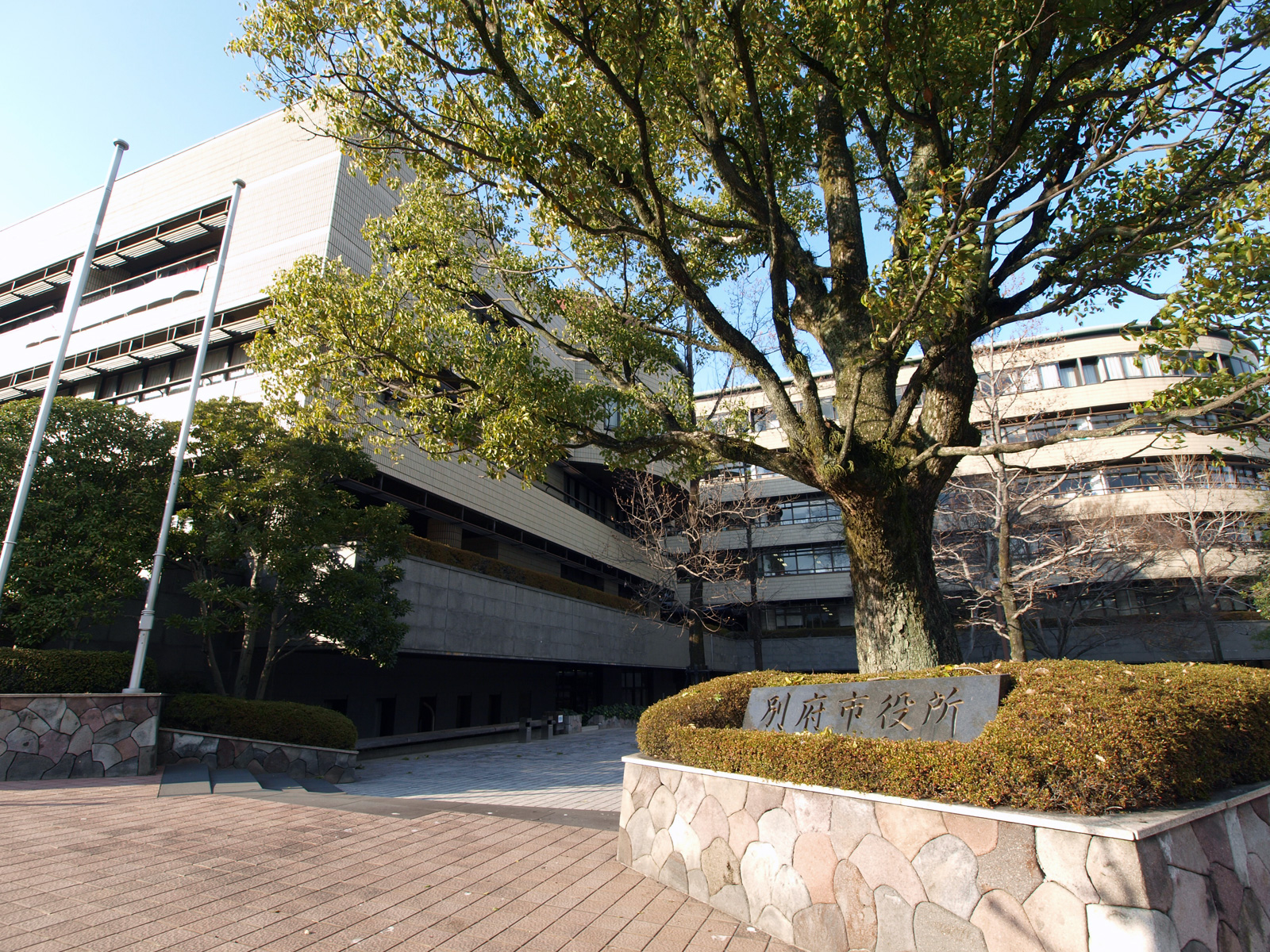
Beppu City Hall

Beppu (別府市, Beppu-shi) is a city in Ōita Prefecture on the island of Kyushu, Japan. As of November 30, 2023, the city had a population of 113,045 in 62,702 households, and a population density of 900 persons per km^{2}. The total area of the city is 125.34 km^{2} (48.39 sq mi). Beppu is famous for its hot springs. In 2024, Beppu celebrated its centenary as a city.

== Geography ==
Beppu is situated at the west end of Beppu Bay, around the east central prefecture. Adjacent municipalities include Ōita (the prefectural capital), Usa, Yufu, and Hiji.

The east area of the city consists of an alluvial fan as well as alluvial plain, made with rivers flowing into Beppu Bay, namely Asami River, Haruki River and Sakai River. The main urban area of Beppu has been formed within this relatively narrow land which spans approximately 5 km from east to west and 10 km from north to south.

The west area of the city includes a number of scenic locations such as Yufugawa Canyon, which has been selected as one of One Hundred Views of Oita, and/or some designated areas of Aso Kujū National Park, with a large amount of forests.

Around the city are mountains or highlands with elevations of several hundreds meters above sea level. Most of those mountains are Quaternary volcanoes. Particularly, locations such as Mount Tsurumi is relatively new, and fumarolic activities are observed. Besides Mount Tsurumi, Mount Yufu, Mount Ohira and others comprise a range of mountains.

There are a large number of seismic faults on the north and south of the alluvial fan, surrounding the urban area (giving rise to a large number of thermal vents). Given the short distance from the sea shore on the east coast to the west part of the city with altitude of several hundreds meters or higher, the city has many slopes mainly on the east-west direction.

=== Climate ===
Beppu has a humid subtropical climate (Köppen Cfa) characterized by warm summers and cool winters with light to no snowfall. The average annual temperature in Beppu is 15.2 °C. The average annual rainfall is 1663 mm with September as the wettest month. The temperatures are highest on average in August, at around 26.2 °C, and lowest in January, at around 4.3 °C.

=== Demographics ===
Per Japanese census data, the population of Beppu is as shown below

Historical population
Year	Pop.	±%
1960	107,734	—
1970	123,786	+14.9%
1980	136,485	+10.3%
1990	130,334	−4.5%
2000	126,523	−2.9%
2010	125,407	−0.9%
2020	115,321	−8.0%

== History ==
The area of Beppu was part of ancient Bungo Province. During the Kamakura period, due to its onsens, it began to be used as a health resort for wounded samurai.

Beppu Port (later Kunisaki Port) was opened on May 30, 1871, with connections to Osaka and other ports on the Seto Inland Sea. It was the main logistics hub for the Imperial Japanese Army during the Satsuma Rebellion of 1877. Hot spring development as a tourist destination began in earnest from 1879 with the opening of Takegawara Onsen. In 1885, a ferry service to Uwajima in Shikoku commenced. The village of Beppu was established on May 1, 1889 with the creation of the modern municipalities system and was raised to town status on April 11, 1893.

Beppu and Hamawaki Town merged on April 1, 1906 (with a total population of 12,306). Beppu Station opened on July 16, 1911 and on July 15, 1923, a regular seaplane route to Osaka was opened. It was raised to city status on April 1, 1924 (total population 32,276). In 1945, after the Allied Occupation, Camp Chicamauga (present day Beppu Park) was established as the regional headquarters. In December 1957, the camp closed and was transferred to the local GSDF garrison; the site reopened as a park in 1979.

== Government ==
Beppu has a mayor-council form of government with a directly elected mayor and a unicameral city council of 25 members. Beppu contributes five members to the Ōita Prefectural Assembly. In terms of national politics, the city is part of the Ōita 3rd district of the lower house of the Diet of Japan.

== Education ==
Beppu has 14 public elementary schools and seven public junior high schools operated by the city government, and two public high schools operated by the Ōita Prefectural Board of Education. There are also one private elementary school, junior high school and two private high schools. The prefecture operates one special education school for the handicapped.

There are also several colleges and universities within the city:

- Beppu University, a private university first chartered in 1954, also has a campus in Oita City.
- Beppu Mizobe Gakuen College, established in 1986, is a private junior college located in the north of Beppu.
- Ritsumeikan Asia Pacific University, a private university established in 2000.

== Transportation ==
=== Railways ===
JR Kyushu - Nippō Main Line

- Kamegawa - Beppu Daigaku - Beppu - Higashi-Beppu

=== Highways ===
- Higashikyushu Expressway
- National Route 10
- National Route 213
- National Route 500

== Local attractions ==
The economy of Beppu is strongly influenced by tourism with its many hot spring resorts.

=== Hot springs ===
Beppu is famous for its onsen (Japanese style hot springs). It has eight major geothermal hot spots known as Beppu Hattō (別府八湯). The eight major hot spring areas are Beppu Onsen, Kankaiji, Kamegawa, Shibaseki, Kannawa, Myoban, Horita, and Hamawaki.

There are over 150 individual onsen facilities for bathing in Beppu. There is an onsen stamp rally where individuals receive a stamp for each onsen they visit. If an individual receives 88 stamps, they are considered to be an "onsen expert" (温泉名人, onsen meijin). Notable onsen bathing facilities in Beppu include Takegawara Onsen, Myoban Yunosato Onsen, and Hyotan Onsen.

The "Hells of Beppu" refer to a variety of hot springs in Beppu which are for viewing rather than bathing. There are seven hells that are part of the Jigoku Meguri (地獄めぐり) tour. It includes hells such as Oniyama Jigoku (鬼山地獄), which literally means "monster mountain hell" due to the large numbers of crocodiles bred and kept on its grounds and Umi Jigoku (海地獄) or "Sea Hell" which is known for its vibrant cobalt-blue water. Five of these are located in the Kannawa district, each within walking distance of each other, and two are located in the Shibaseki district which require about a five minute bus or car ride to access from the Kannawa district hells.

Beppu has not only usual hot springs but some sand and foot baths as well. One famous spot was Beppu Kaihin Sunayu, Ashiyu (別府海浜砂湯, 足湯), ("Beppu marine beach sand bath and foot bath"). However, it has been closed for redevelopment since April 2023 with reopening scheduled for 2025. Sand baths can still be found at Hyotan Onsen, and foot baths can be found in various locations throughout Beppu including the Sea Hell (海地獄, umi jigoku) on the Hells of Beppu tour.

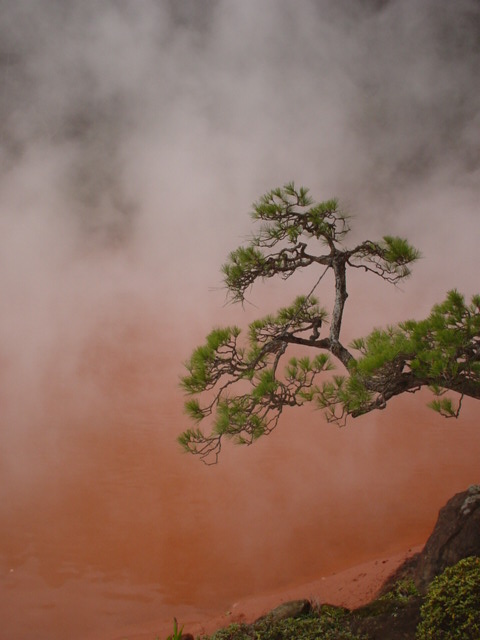
Natural iron hot spring which is one of the "Hells of Beppu"

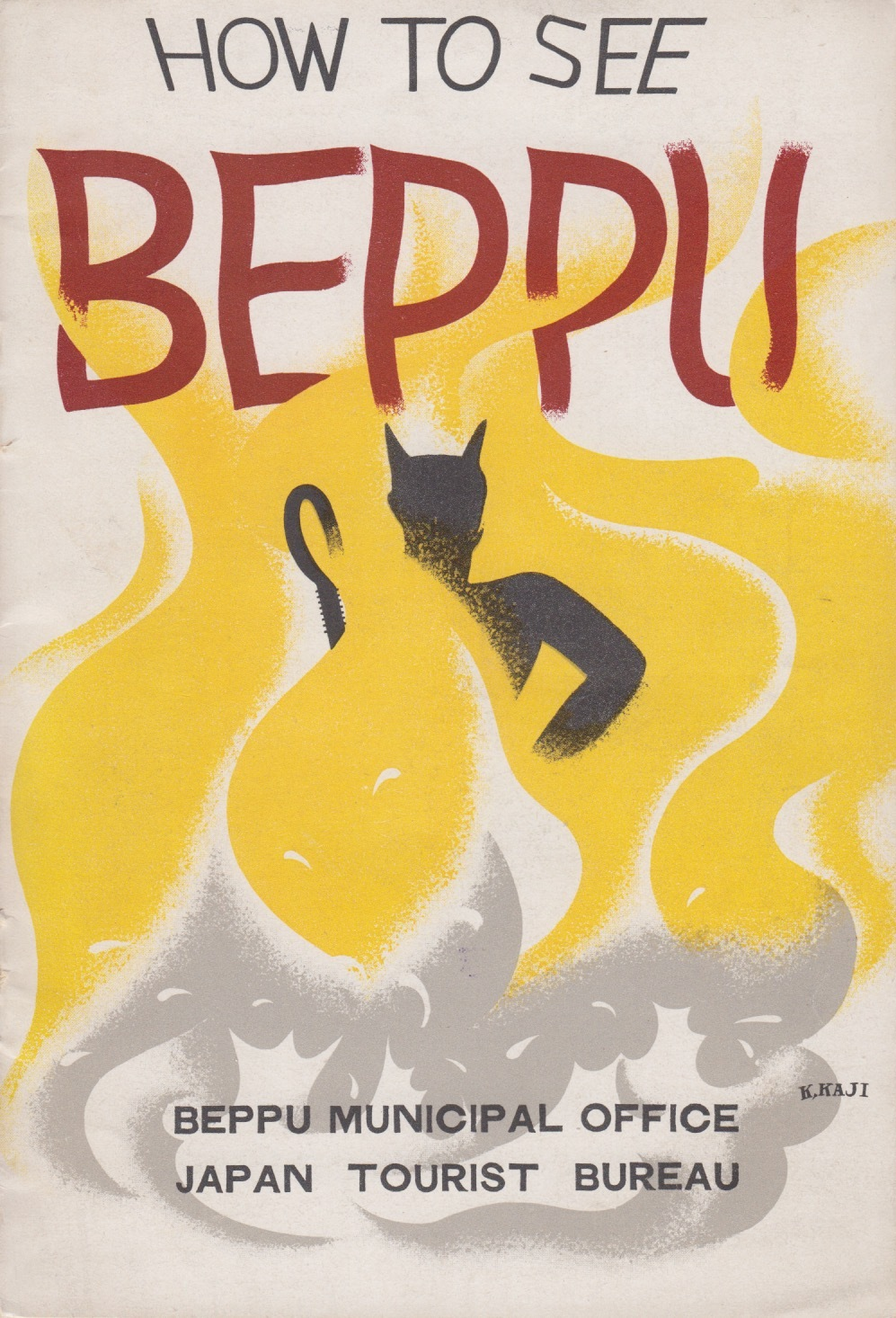
1937 travel poster, Beppu hot springs

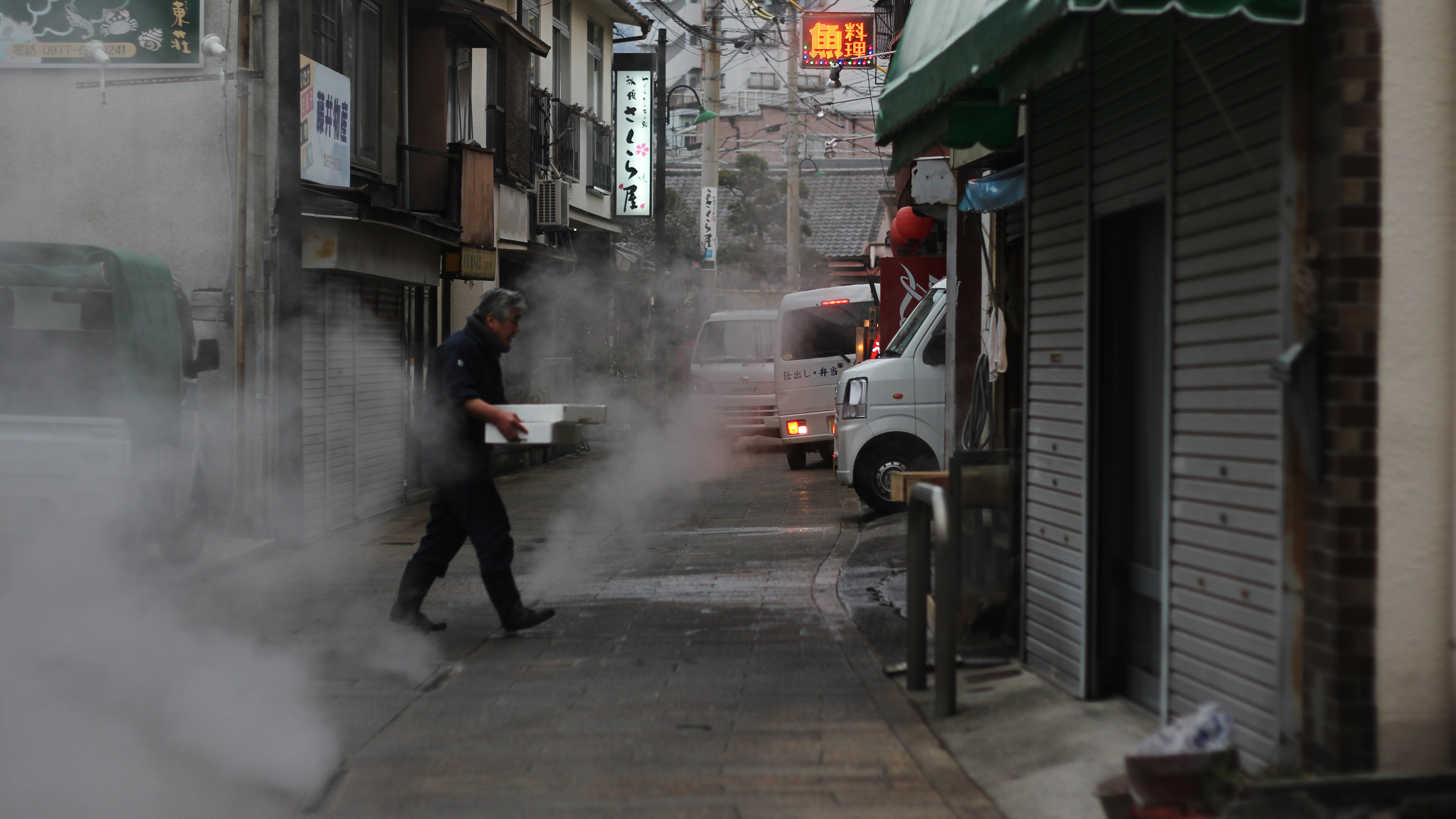
Kannawa area of Beppu city

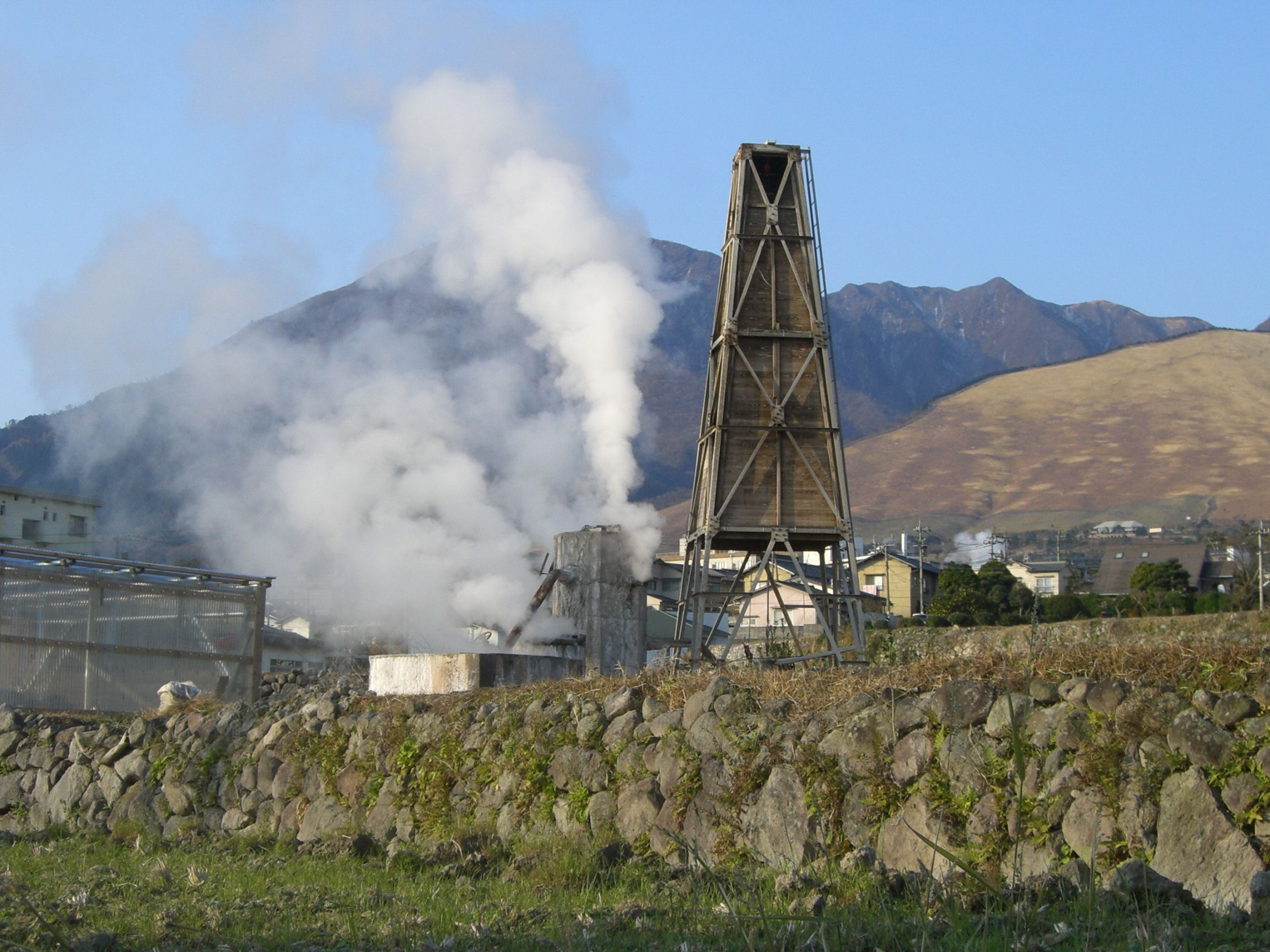
A hot spring-well in Beppu

=== Other attractions ===
Beppu Park (別府公園) opened in 1979 and is located in the center of the city, a 15-minute walk from Beppu Station. Beppu Fireworks Festival, held in late July, is one of the biggest fireworks displays in Oita. Five thousand fireworks are set off from boats floating on Beppu Bay. Beppu Contemporary Art Festival "Mixed Bathing World" is an art festival held every three years in Beppu.

A well known local landmark is Beppu Tower, which opened in May 1957. The Beppu Ropeway (which opened December 1962) connects Beppu with Mount Tsurumi. The Tokiwa Department Store opened on October 8, 1988 as part of the redevelopment of the Kitahama area, and on November 29, 2007, YouMe Town Beppu opened as part of the Kusunoki Port redevelopment.

Shidaka Lake is located 600 metres (1,969 feet) above sea level. Otobaru Waterfall is a local natural attraction, located in the mountain area of Beppu city, 20 minutes' walk from Wonder Rakutenchi, a traditional amusement park. Takasakiyama Monkey Park is located 10 minutes from the center of Beppu by bus. The park is home to more than 1,500 Japanese macaques. Kijima Kogen is a resort which includes an 18-hole golf course and hotel alongside an amusement park. It is located on a plateau en route to Yufuin.

== Sports ==
Beppu is part of the course of the annual Beppu-Ōita Marathon, which traces a path between Beppu and its neighboring city of Ōita. The competition has been held every year since 1952 and is classed as an IAAF Silver Label road race.

Beppu is also the destination of the "100km Walk", an annual event where thousands of competitors walk overnight from Yukuhashi to Beppu. The 26th event was held on October 12–13, 2024.

Beppu is home to the Oita Heat Devils basketball team. The team's season was canceled in 2011 due to the earthquake that struck Japan on March 11.

== International relations ==
The city of Beppu has sister city relationships with the following locations.

- Atami, Shizuoka, Japan, since August 5, 1966
- Bath, Somerset, England, United Kingdom, since October 31, 1994
- Beaumont, Texas, United States, since May 20, 1985
- Jeju, South Korea, since January 17, 2003
- Mokpo, Jeollanam-do, South Korea, since October 1, 1984
- Rotorua, Bay of Plenty Region, New Zealand, since July 10, 1987
- Yantai, Shandong, China, since July 26, 1985
