= Beppu Onsen =

Hot spring system in Japan

Coordinates: 33°16′49″N 131°30′0″E

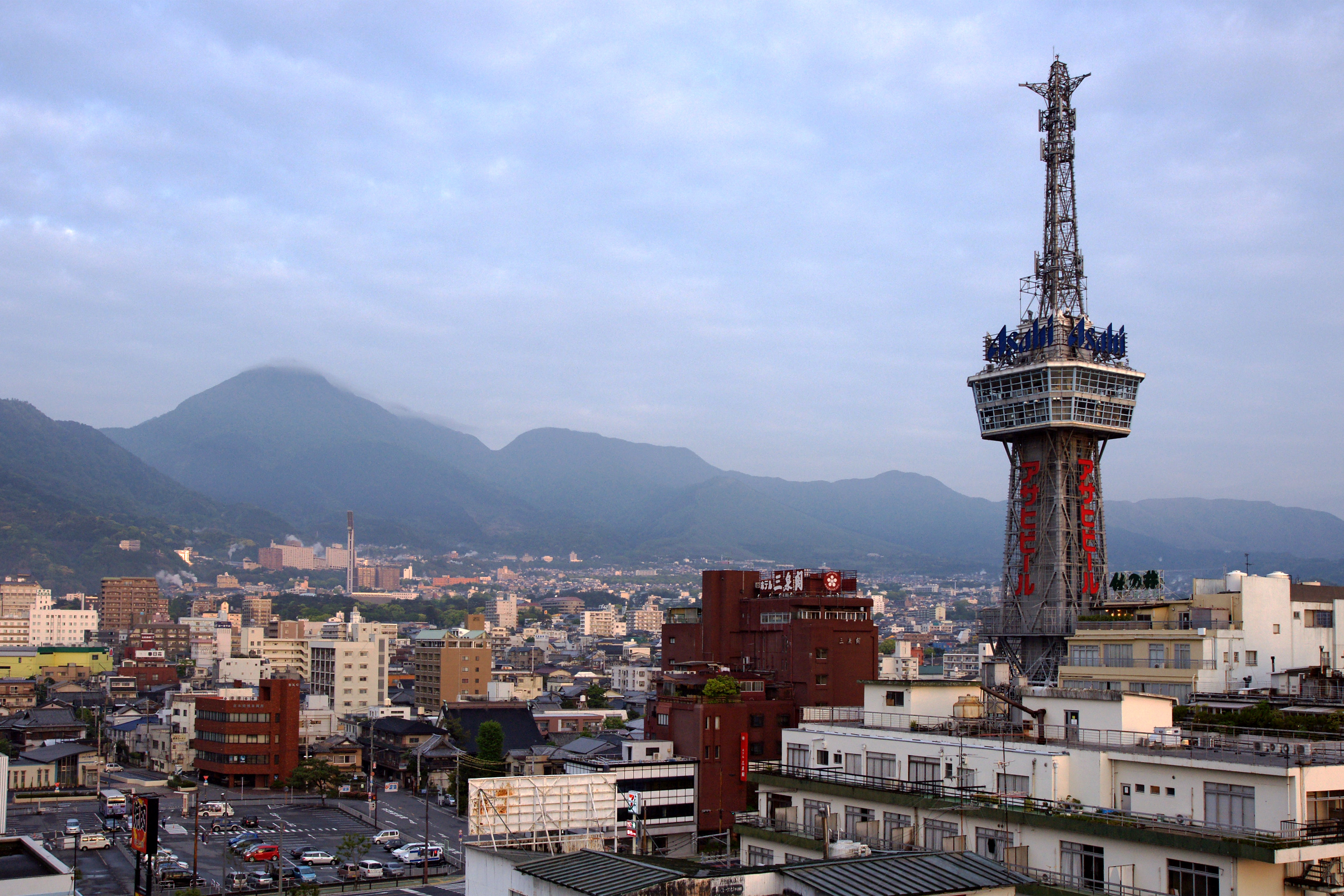
- Beppu with Beppu Tower in background

- Location within Japan
- Location: Ōita Prefecture
- Type: geothermal, volcanic
- Discharge: 130,000 tons of hot spring water per day
- Temperature: 40°C - 44°C

Beppu Onsen (別府温泉) is an extensive hot spring system in the city of Beppu, Ōita, Japan. There are eight distinct major thermal spring zones called "Beppu Hatto"（別府八湯).

There are rich hot spring resources in Beppu; the volume of water discharged from the Beppu system is second in volume to that of the Yellowstone National Park in the Western United States.

There are 2,909 hot spring vents within the city, and these account for more than 10% of the 27,644 hot spring vents in Japan, according to a survey conducted by the Ministry of the Environment in 2004. Statistics from the Beppu City Hall show that more than 130,000 tons of hot spring water gushes from the ground every day. This is the second largest amount of hot spring water discharge in the world, and the largest amount in Japan.

== History ==
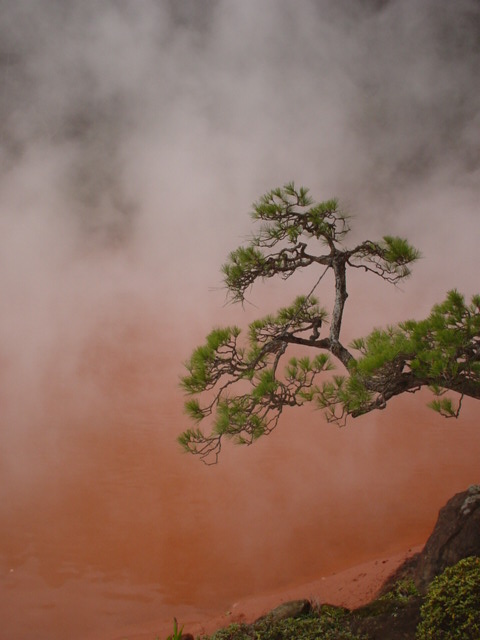
Natural iron hot spring, one of the Hells of Beppu

The Iyo-no-Kuni Topography, a text from the early part of the 8th century, states that "once in the age of the gods, Sukunabikona (スクナビコナ) and Ōkuninushi visited Iyo-no-Kuni, now known as Ehime Prefecture. Sukunabikona fainted from illness. With a deep sorrow Ōkuninushi placed a long pipe at the bottom of the sea all the way through from Dōgo Onsen (Matsuyama) to Beppu to supply therapeutic thermal waters for him to bathe, by the grace of which he was saved." Additionally, writings from the Bungo Province describes Akayusen (Chinoike Jigoku).

Reports exist that state sanatoria were established in the Kamakura period Ōtomo Yoriyasuin Beppu, Kannawa and Hamawaki regions to heal wounded samurai during the war against the Mongolian Army. In the 7th year of the Genroku Era in the Edo period, the prosperous hot springs of Beppu were written about by Dr. Ekiken Kaibara. During the Meiji period onward, Beppu's thermal springs were excavated with the boring techniques used in Kazusa, resulting in the completion of more than 1000 wells by the final years of the Meiji period. In the 1960s and 1970s, after World War Two, Beppu Onsen town was rapidly developed establishing social stability and economical improvement.

Especially from about 1919 to 1955, the amount of hot water taken rose to use the heat in agriculture and salt production, many problems happened; for example, the depletion of the old source of the springs and a decrease in temperature. Because of this, a new source of hot springs was searched and in 1957, a new layer of hot springs was found in 200m~300m below ground and was started for use. Since 1964 using hot springs for salt production has been banned, however, using them for agriculture and aqua farming of fish has continued for the moment.

== Hot spring areas (Beppu Hatto) ==
There are 16 municipal bathhouses fed with hot spring water in the Beppu Onsen area fed by eight separate hot spring zones known collectively as Beppu Hatto (named such in 1924), previously known in the Taisho years as Beppu Jyutto.

=== Beppu Onsen ===
Close to Beppu Station in the centre of town, Beppu Onsen is the most popular area. Ekimae-Kotō Onsen is a two-minute walk from the station and provides tired visitors and locals with invigoration and relaxation. The Hells of Beppu field of hot springs are nationally designated as a "Place of Scenic Beauty".

=== Kankaiji Onsen ===
The Kankaiji onsen site is located on a hill in the south-west urban area of Beppu. Bathers can enjoy medicinal hot spring waters along with spectacular scenery. The hot spring was written about in the historical book, Bungokokushi, from the Edo period, stating that numerous people visited the onsen for its views and scenery of all of Beppu Hatto. After the wildfire of 1931, the onsen was redeveloped into a resort, and a large geothermal power generator.

=== Kamegawa Onsen ===
This onsen area neighboring Kamegawa Station is surrounded by rustic scenery. Beppu Kaihin Sunayu features open-air sand bathing found near Beppu City's seashore, mineral mud baths, and iron spring baths from the Chino-ike Jigoku (Hell of Blood Pond) containing high levels of ferric oxide.[p. 25]

=== Shibaseki Onsen ===
Legends claim that Emperor Daigo soaked in the hot springs in 895 CE, and Emperor Goreisen visitied in 1044 CE. Located along a mountain stream, Shibaseki Onsen is known for its hot steam bath. With a woodland trail nearby, it is designated as a national health onsen resort.

=== Kannawa Onsen ===
Kannawa onsen has numerous jets of white steam emitting from gushing hot springs. There are shops and Ryokan (Japanese inn) located on narrow and winding streets. It is also known for steam baths. The geothermally heated hot spring water emerges from the source at temperature ranging from 64 °C|147.2 °F in the summer to 60 °C|140 °F in the winter. The soaking pool temperatures are 45 °C|113 °F.

=== Myoban Onsen ===
Myoban Onsen, on the hill facing Beppu Bay, is a small, quiet mountain resort in a remote area. There are several types of thermal bathing features such as mud baths, the milky-colored alum springs or the sulphur springs accompanied by a distinctive sulphuric odor. Mineral deposits are collected on blue clay and dried into crystals (yunohana) of mineral salts in thatched structures called Yunohana-goya. These minerals are then packaged as bath salts.

=== Horita Onsen ===
Located west of Kankaiji Onsen area, Horita Onsen is a rustic hot-spring resort. It has existed since the Edo Period, and has been used to relieve the fatigue of a long journey. The waters of two public baths work effectively on symptoms such as nerve pains.

=== Hamawaki Onsen ===
With quaint streets lined with old-fashioned inns and houses, Hamawaki Onsen is the birthplace of Beppu Onsen. It was named after the local beach (Hama). During the Shōwa era a concrete bathhouse building was constructed, later in 1991, Yutopia (Utopia) Hamawaki, a multi-purpose health facility was built based on the design of the Kurhaus of Europe. After a renovation in 2018 to better control temperature, the water can be regulated in some of the soaking pools from "not so hot" to "hot" to "very hot" at this onsen.

== Gallery ==
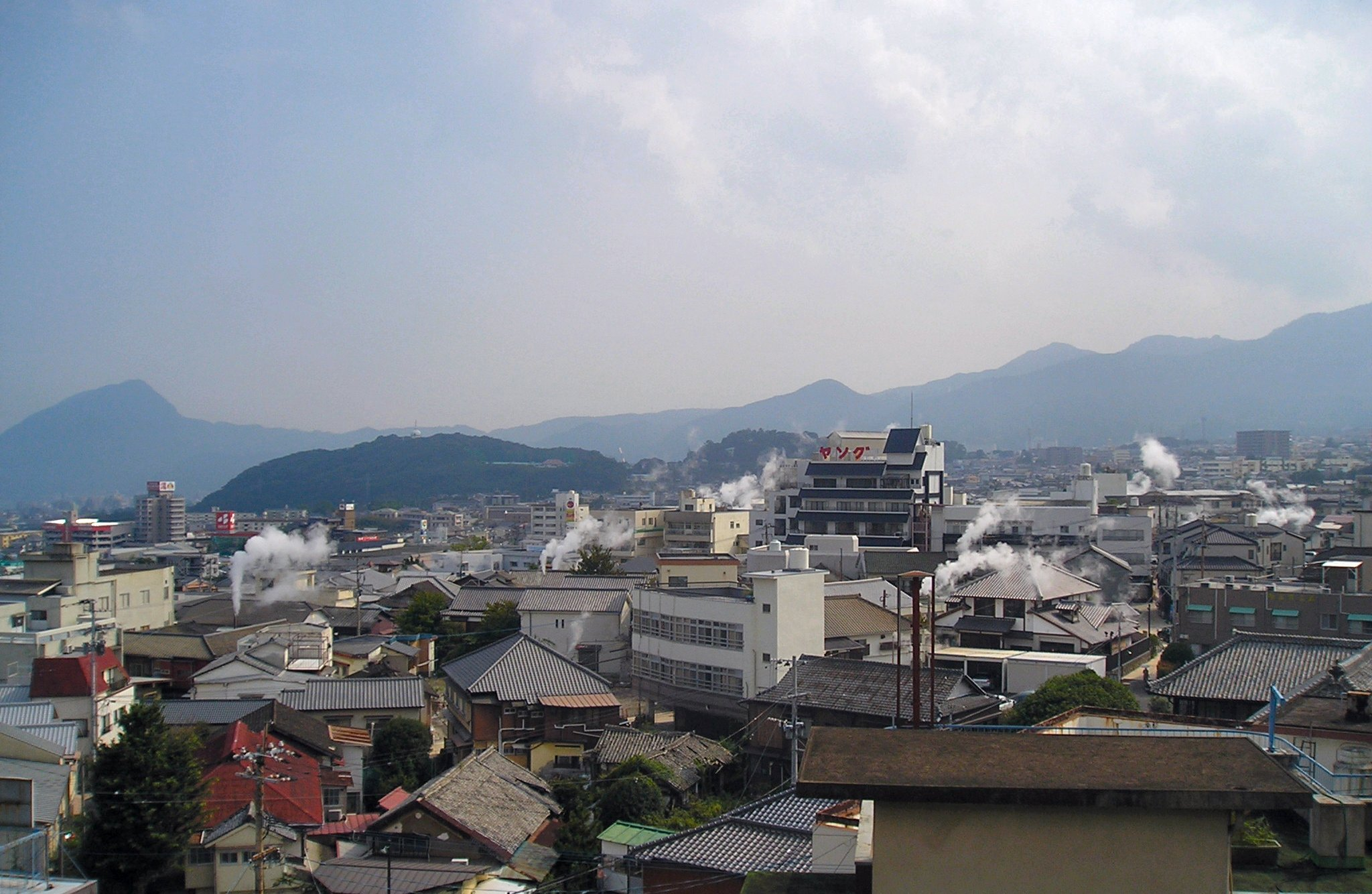
Kannawa Onsen panorama view

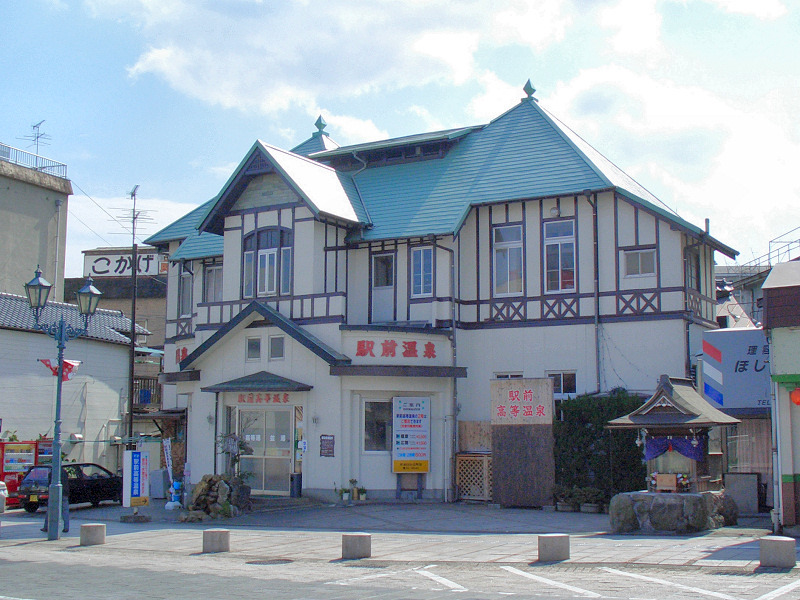
Ekimae-Kotō Onsen

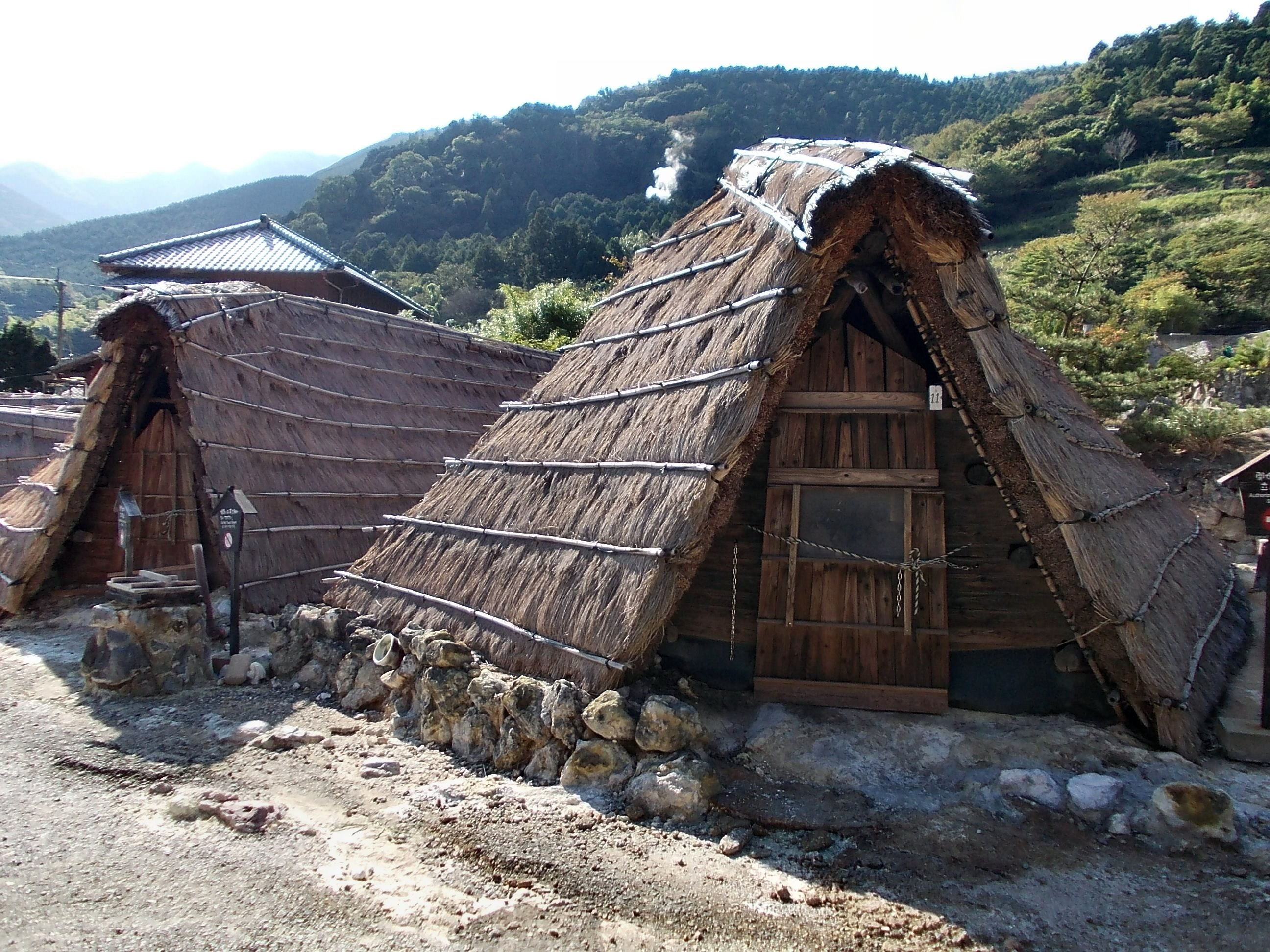
The straw huts of Myōban Onsen, called yunohana-goya

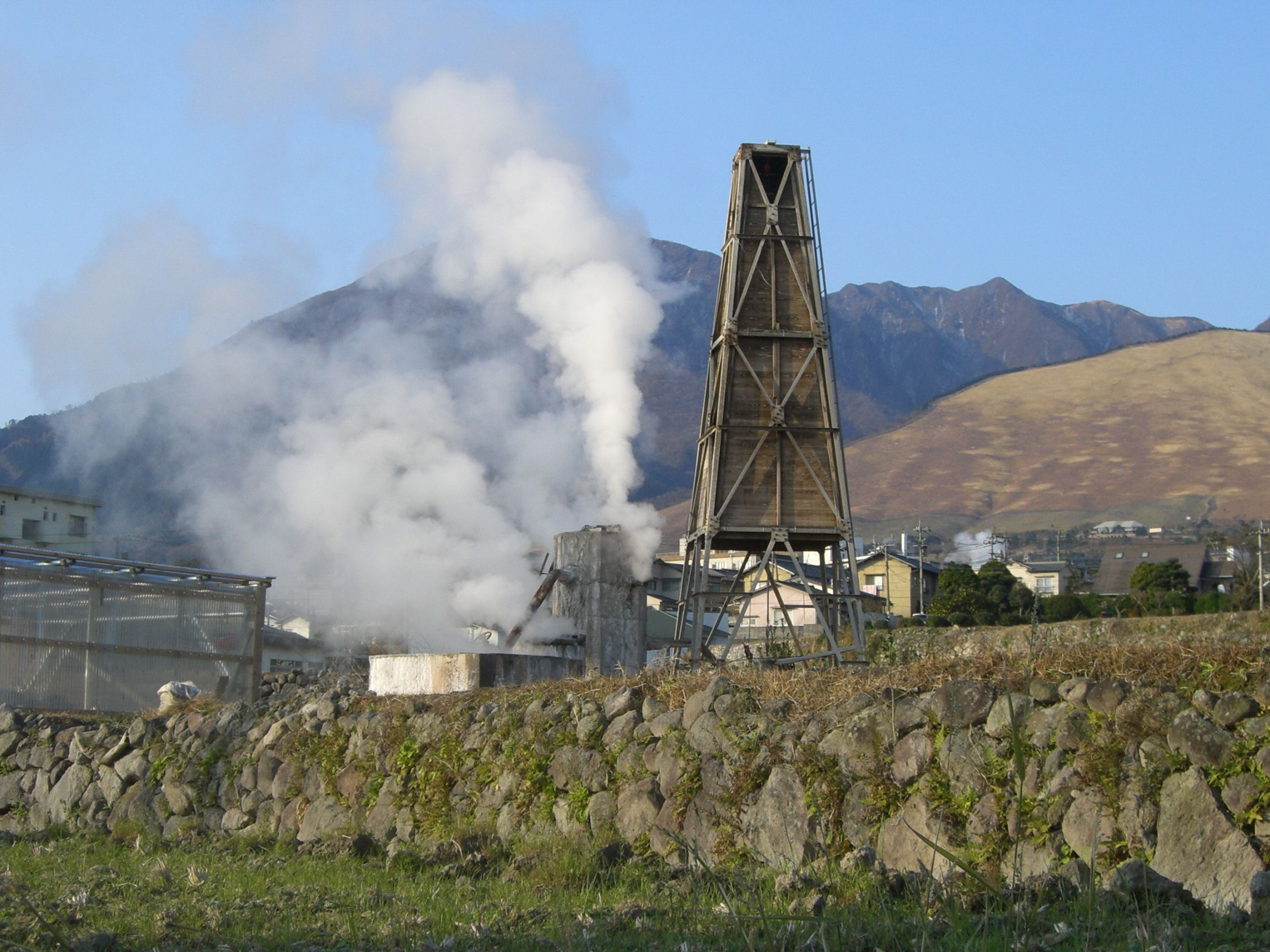
One of hot spring-wells site in Beppu Spa

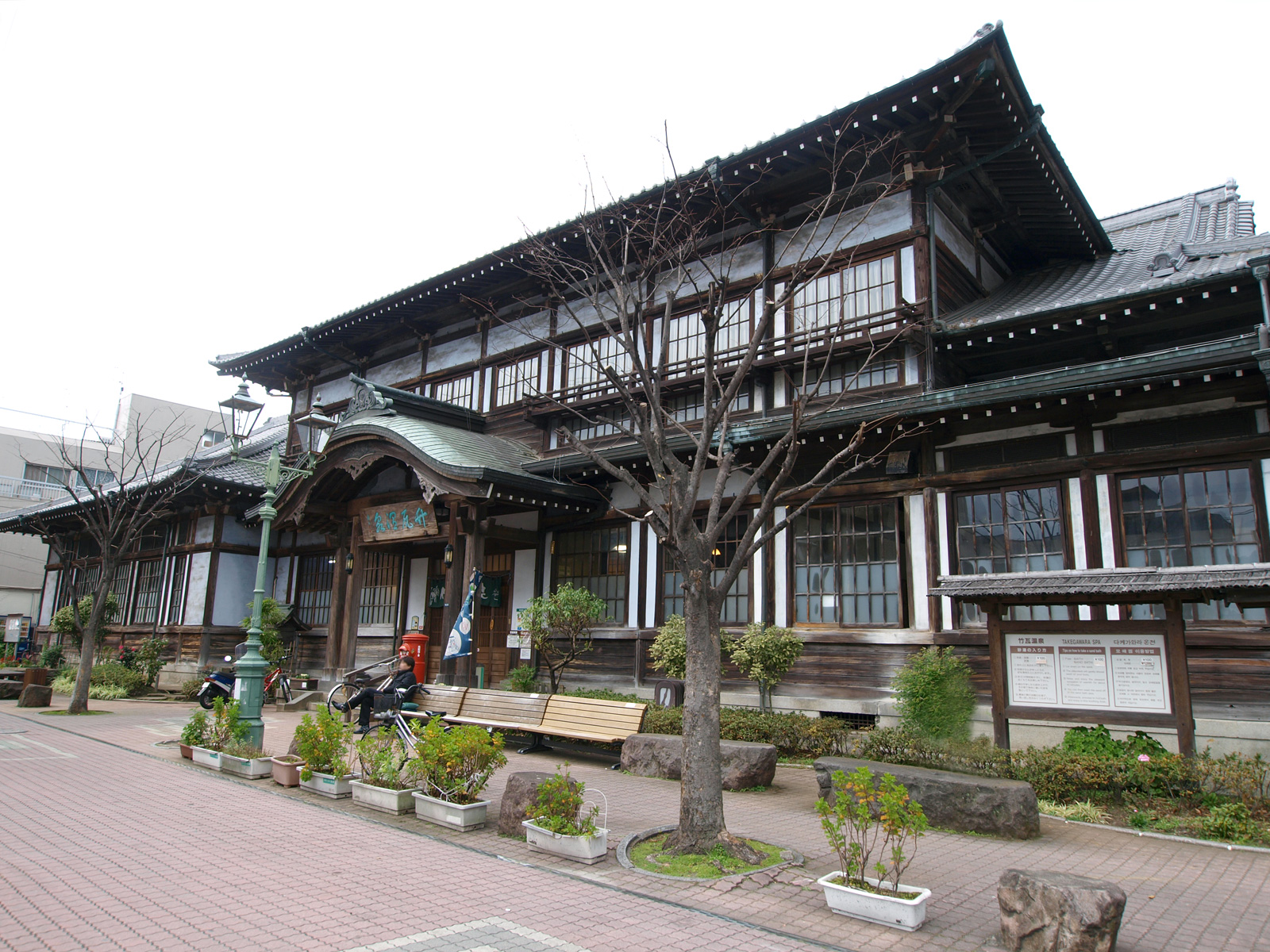
Takegawara Onsen

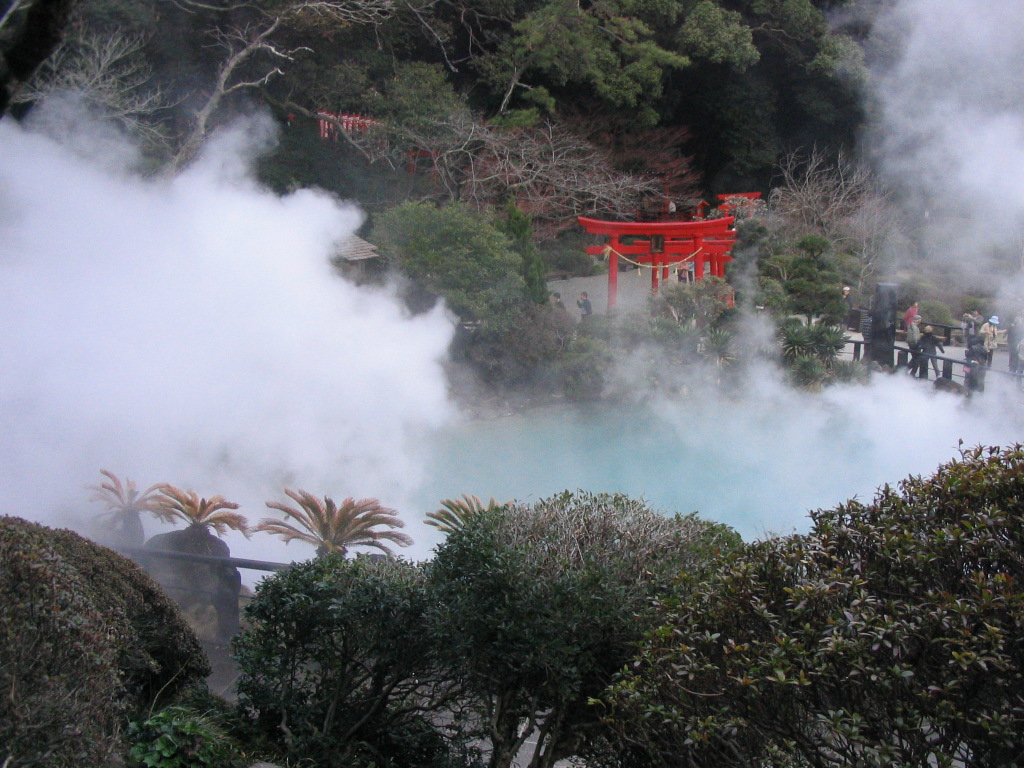
Beppu umi jigoku (torture of the sea)

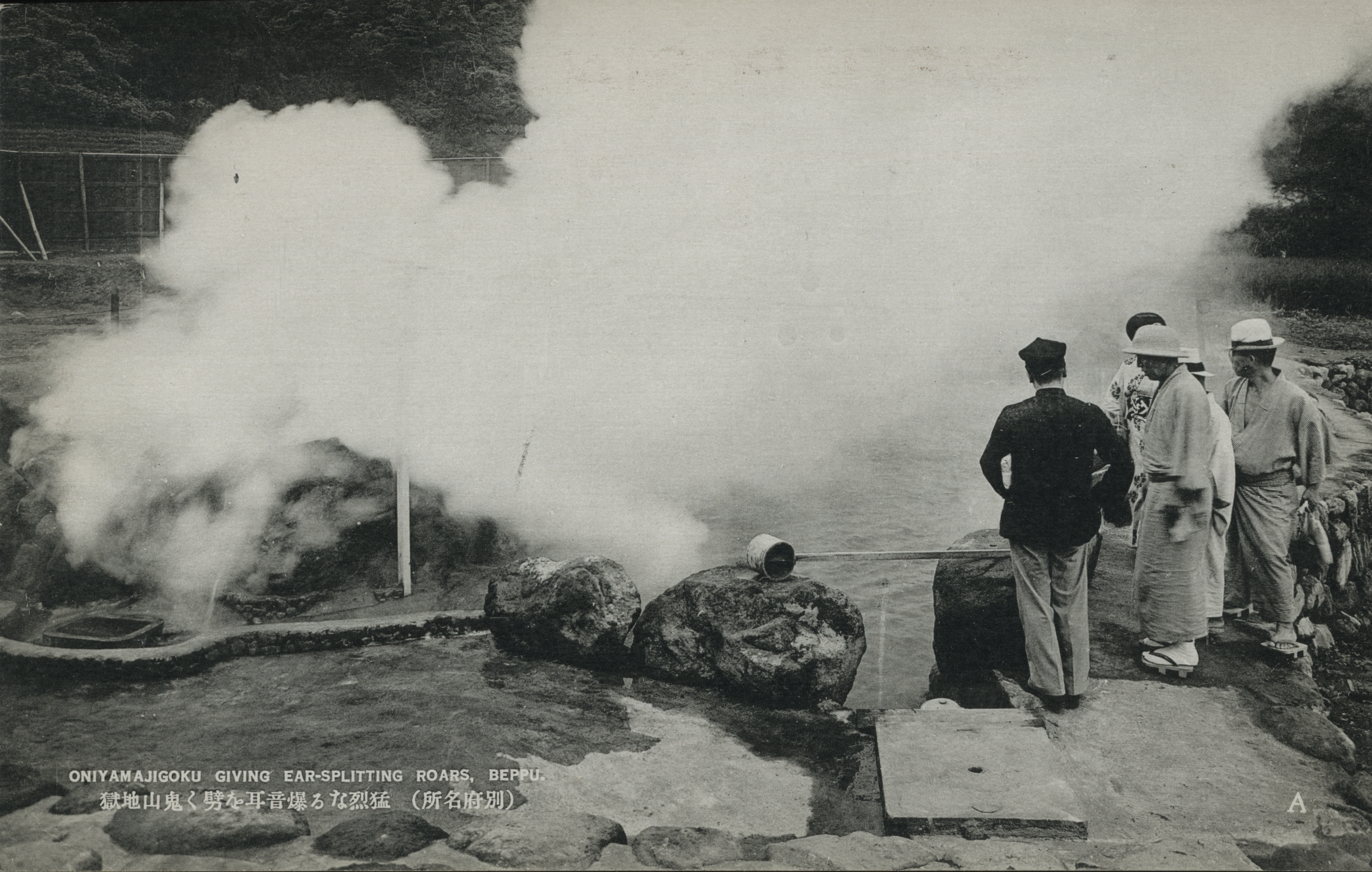
Tourists at Oniyamajigoku, Beppu, 1920

== Public baths ==
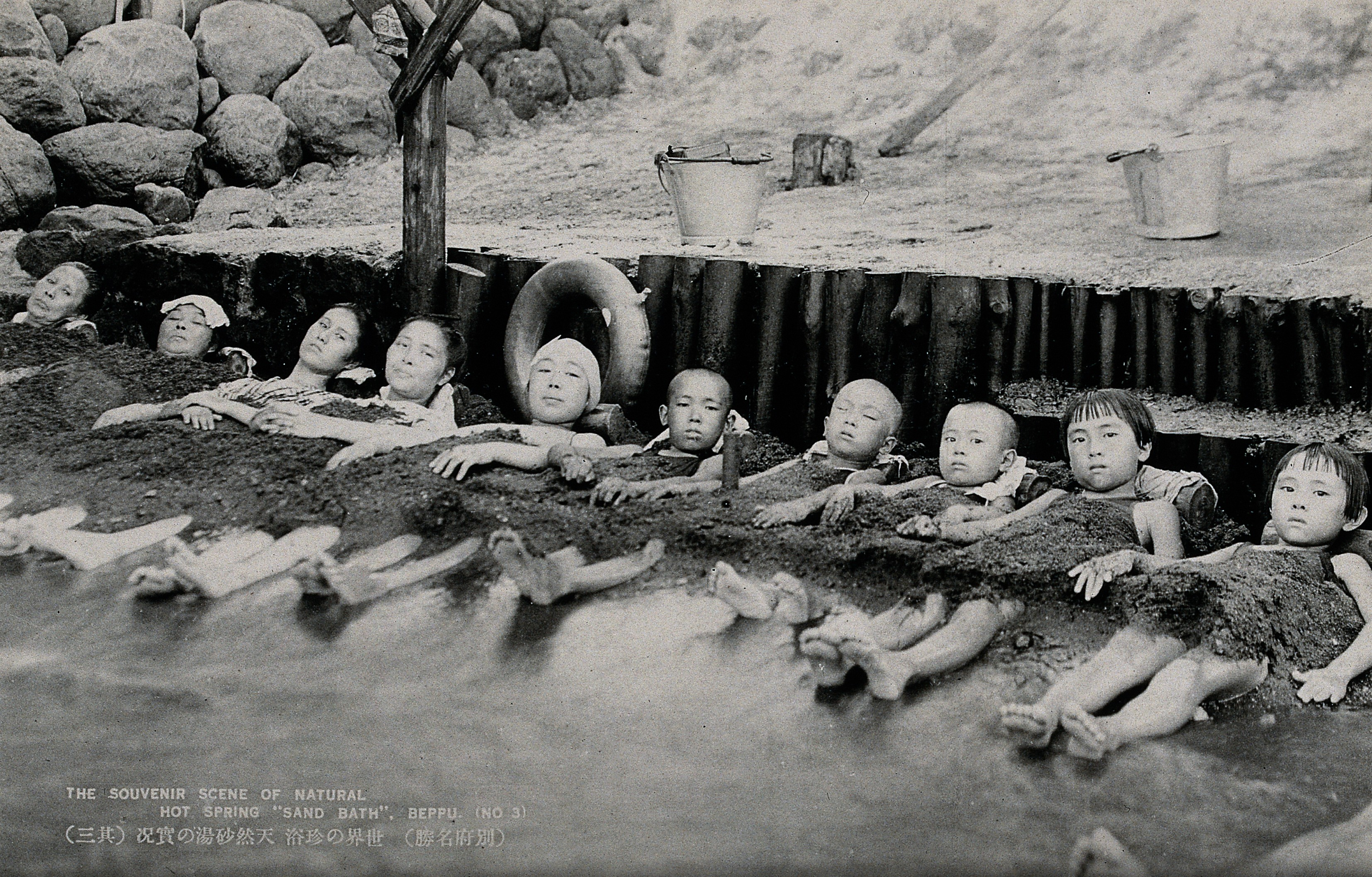
Women and children take a sand bath at a hot spring in Beppu.

=== Takegawara Onsen ===
Originally built in 1879, "Takegawara Onsen" is located a short seven minutes walk from Beppu Station, in Beppu City's downtown commercial zone. The district was built during the Meiji Period. In addition to hot spring soaking pools there are sand baths, where attendants envelop guest's bodies in warm sand.

Water temperatures vary from 43 °C to 45 °C.

=== Kannawa Mushi-yu steam bath ===
Kannawa is sometimes referred to as the "birthplace of Beppu Hot Springs. A popular site in Kannawa Onsen mushi-yu steam bath has long served as a welcome facility for local citizens. "Ashimushi" (foot steam bath), a rarity in the country, is effective in relieving fatigued lower limbs. "Sekisho" (medical herb) room is also popular for its soothing aroma.

== Beppu Onsen Geo-Museum ==
The Beppu Onsen Geo-museum is located in Beppu; its purpose is to share hot spring science and geology with the public. According to the museum director Yusa Yuki, the volcanic hot springs were formed 50,000 years ago, and the parent spring's water temperature reaches as high as 250 °C to 300 °C. Rainwater percolates through the volcanic rock via the Asamigawa fault line on the south side of the Beppu alluvial fan; and via the Kannawana fault on the northside. It takes approximately 50 years for the rainwater to reach the volcanic heat source before generating enough steam and vapor to emerge again to the surface. The Oita region has several active volcanoes, the channels of hot magma below the surface can reach over 1,000 °C.
