= Beppu Ropeway =

Japanese aerial lift line opened in 1962

Coordinates: 33°16′53.5″N 131°26′28″E

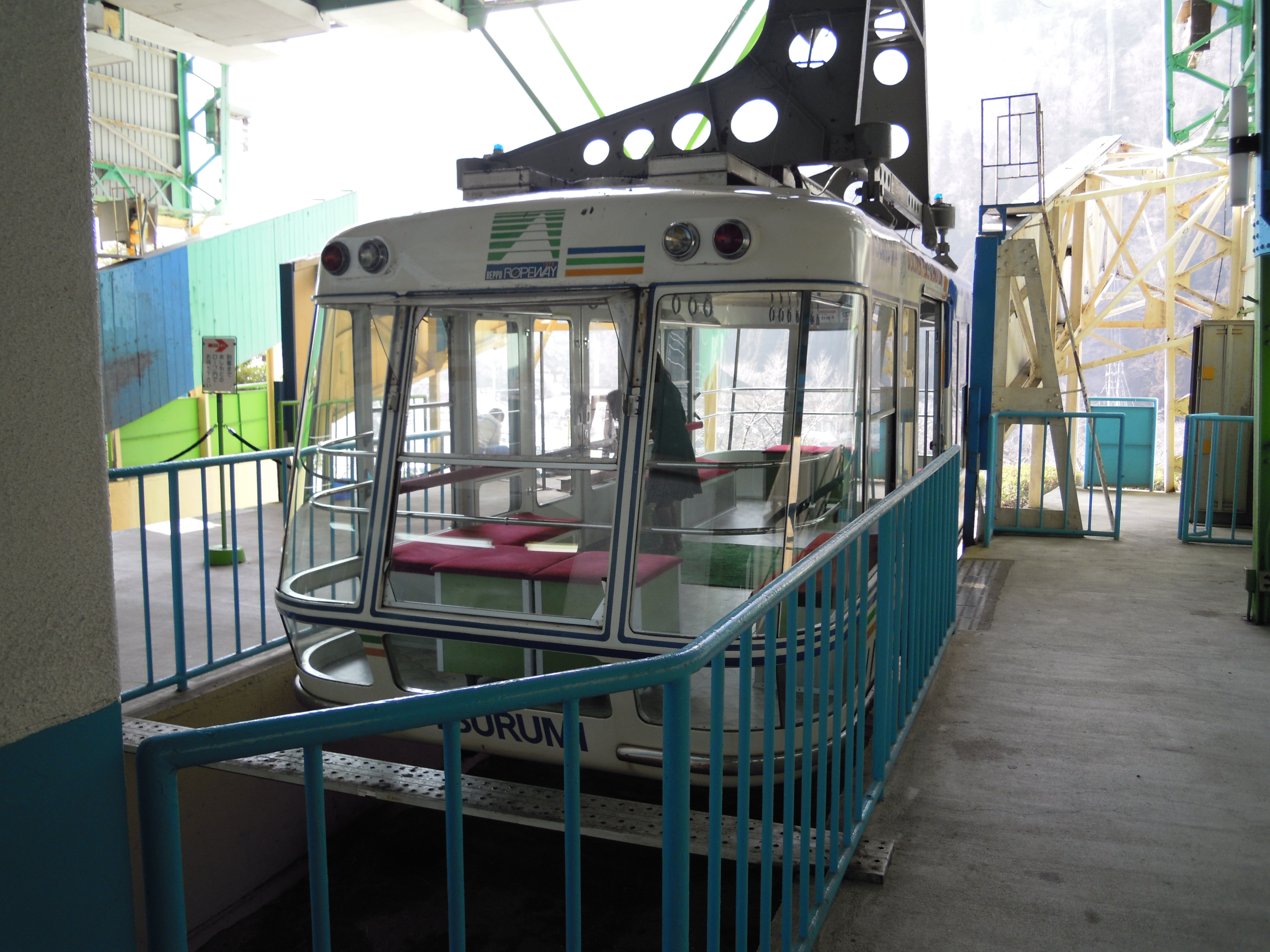
- The gondola "Tsurumi" in 2010
- Interactive map of Beppu Ropeway

Overview
- Status: Operational
- Character: Aerial tramway
- Location: Beppu, Ōita, Japan
- No. of stations: 2
- Open: 1962

Operation
- Carrier capacity: 101 Passengers per cabin, 2 cabins
- Trip duration: 10 min

Technical features
- Line length: 1.8 kilometres (1.1 mi)
- No. of cables: 2 track cables and 2 haulage ropes
- Operating speed: 4.1 m/s
- Vertical Interval: 792 m (2,598 ft)

The Beppu Ropeway (別府ロープウェイ, Beppu rōpuwei) is a Japanese aerial lift line in Beppu, Ōita. This is the only line operated by Beppu Ropeway, a subsidiary of the Kintetsu Group. Opened in 1962, the line climbs Mount Tsurumi near the Beppu onsen hot spring resort. The mountain is most famous as one of the few hard rime sights in Kyūshū. The line operates the whole year.

== Description ==
The ropeway connects Beppu-Kogen station located around 500 meters above sea level and Tsurumi-Sanjo station around 1,300 meter above sea level, both located in Mount Tsurumi. The line is 1,816 meters long, and operates at a speed of 4.1 meters per second. Each trip takes around ten minutes. The line is operated by Beppu Ropeway Corporation Limited, a Subsidiary of Kintetsu Railway.

== History ==
The line began operations on December 21, 1962. The gondolas used in the ropeway previously held the record for the maximum number of passengers per gondola. The gondolas were replaced by the current ones in 1986. In 2012, the two gondolas were renovated to celebrate the 50th anniversary of the ropeway. The Beppu-Kougen station was renovated on July 14, 2018, with each signs supporting multiple languages.

== Basic data ==
- Cable length: 1.8 kilometres (1.1 mi)
- Vertical interval: 792 m (2,598 ft)
- Maximum load: 101 people

== See also ==
- List of aerial lifts in Japan
