= Beppu Mizobe Gakuen College =

Private junior college in Beppu, Ōita, Japan

Coordinates: 33°19′42″N 131°29′14″E

Beppu Mizobe Gakuen College (別府溝部学園短期大学, Beppu mizobe gakuen tanki daigaku) is a private junior college in Beppu, Ōita, Japan, established in 1986. The predecessor of the school was founded in 1964.
