= Mount Tsurumi =

Volcano on the island of Kyushu, Japan

- 鶴見岳
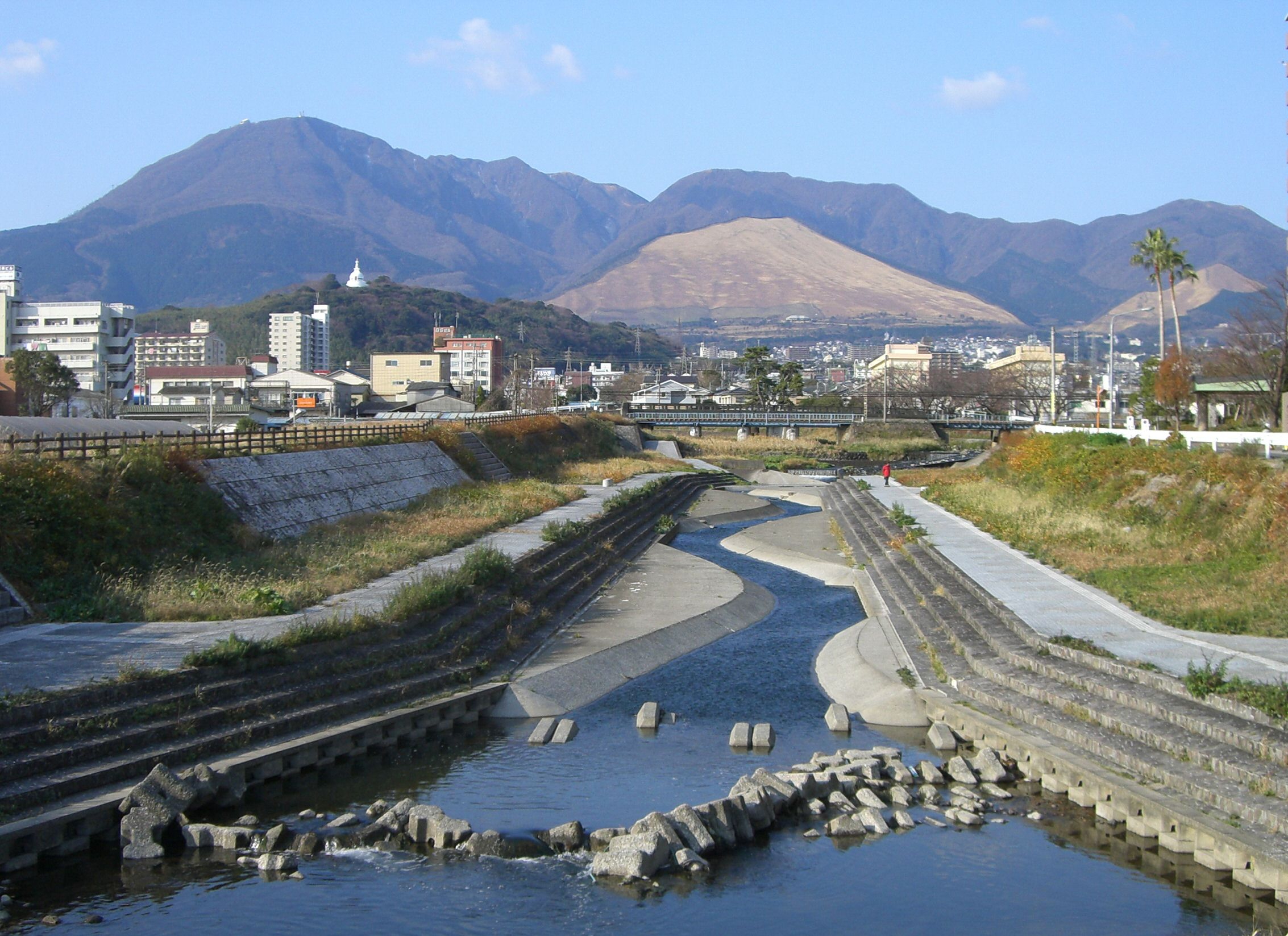
- East side

Highest point
- Elevation: 1,374.5 m (4,510 ft)
- Listing: List of mountains and hills of Japan by height
- Coordinates: 33°17′12″N 131°25′47″E

Naming
- Language of name: Japanese
- Pronunciation: [tsɯɾɯmidake]

Geography
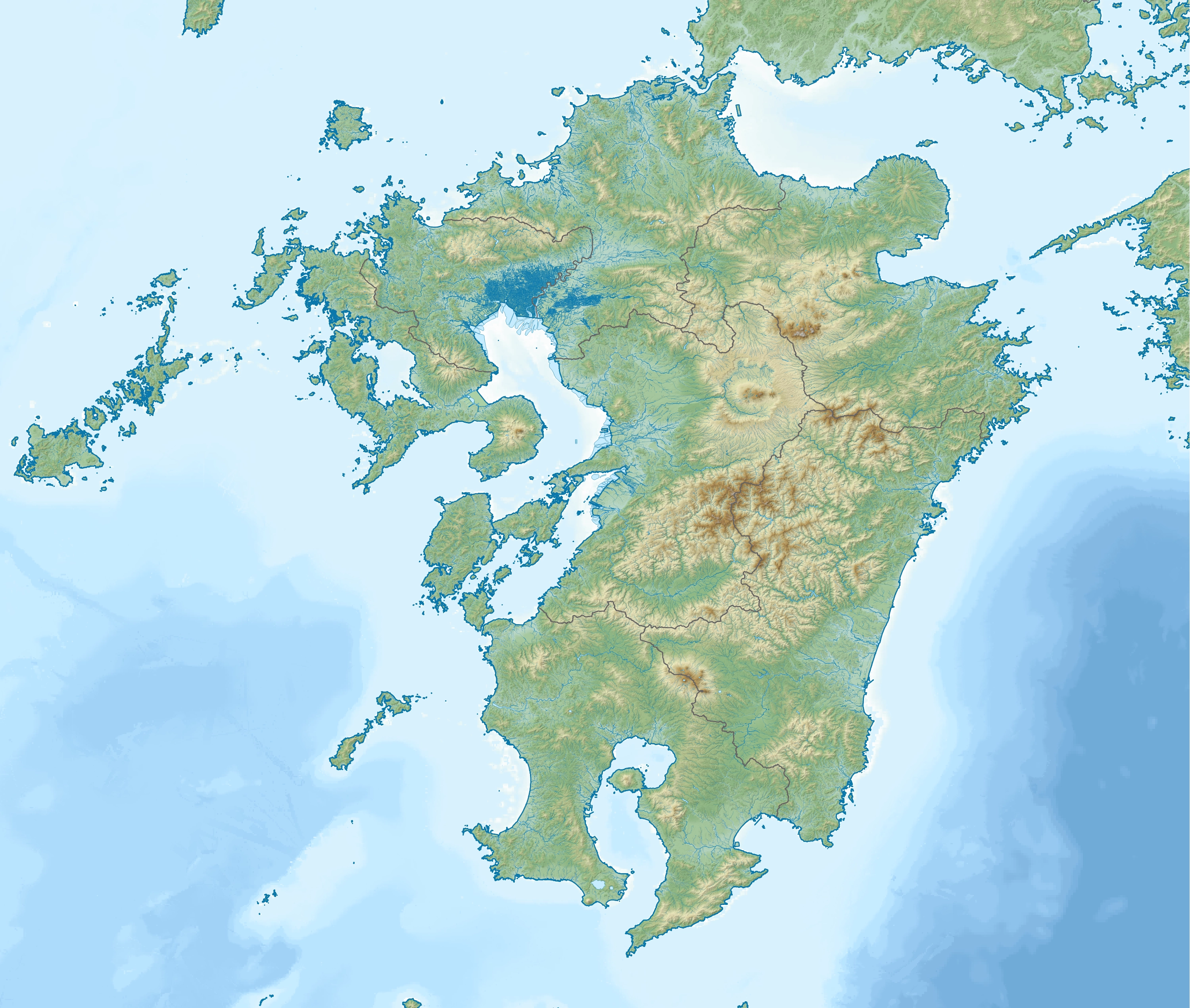
- Location within Japan Location within Kyushu
- Location: Beppu, Ōita, Japan
- Topo map: Geographical Survey Institute 25000:1 別府東

Geology
- Mountain type: Lava dome
- Last eruption: March to May 867 CE

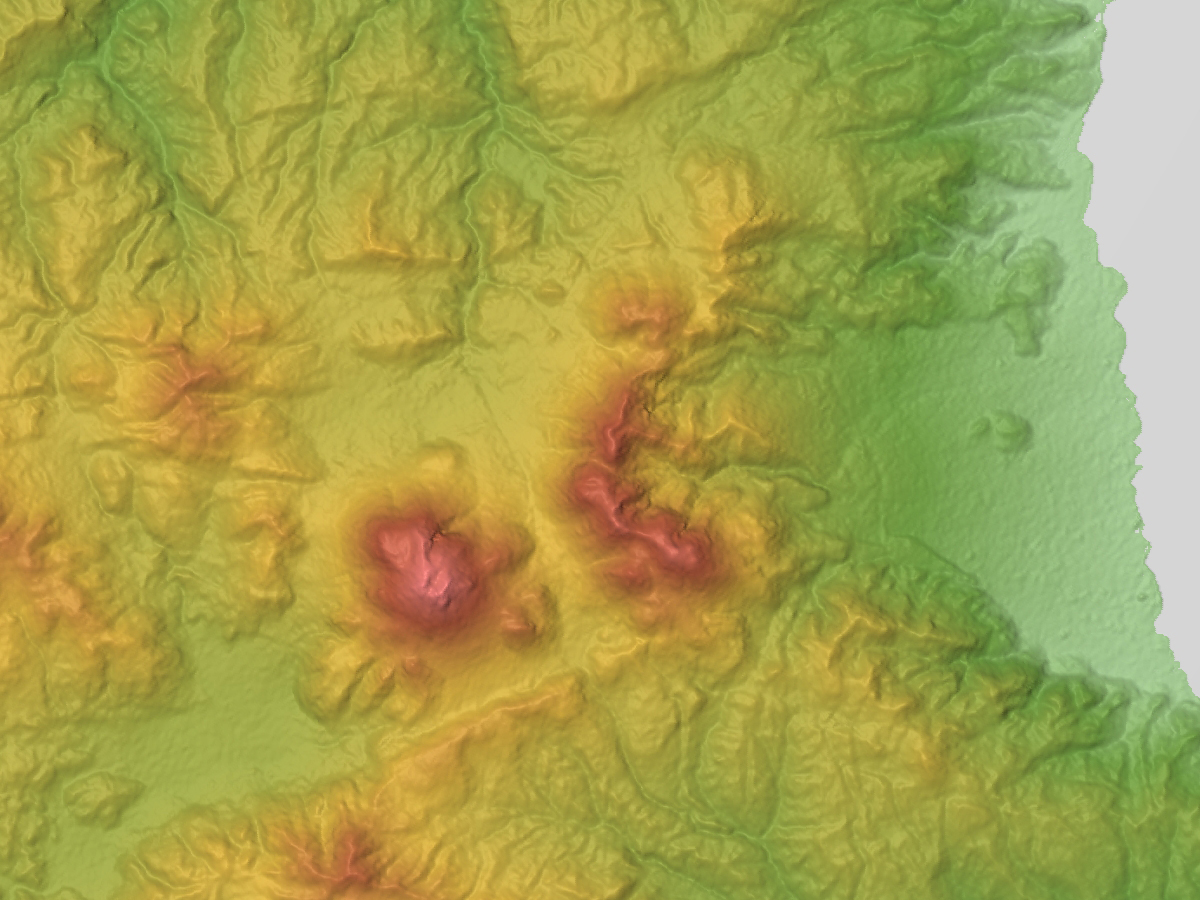
Tsurumi volcano (center) Yufu volcano (left)

Mount Tsurumi (鶴見岳, Tsurumi-dake) is a 1,374.5 m (4,510 ft) volcano in Beppu, Ōita, Japan.

== Outline ==
Mount Tsurumi is a lava dome. It has several peaks, including Mount Kuranoto, Mount Uchi, and Mount Garan. This mountain is one of the Japan 300 mountains, and a part of Aso Kujū National Park.

== Route ==
The easiest way to reach to the top of Mount Tsurumi is to use Kintetsu Beppu Ropeway. When walking up to the top, it takes about two hours from Toriimae Bus Stop and two and half hours from Higashi Tozanguchi Bus Stop.

== Access ==
- Tsurumi Sanjo Station
- Toriimae Bus Stop
- Higashi Tozanguchi Bus Stop

== Gallery ==
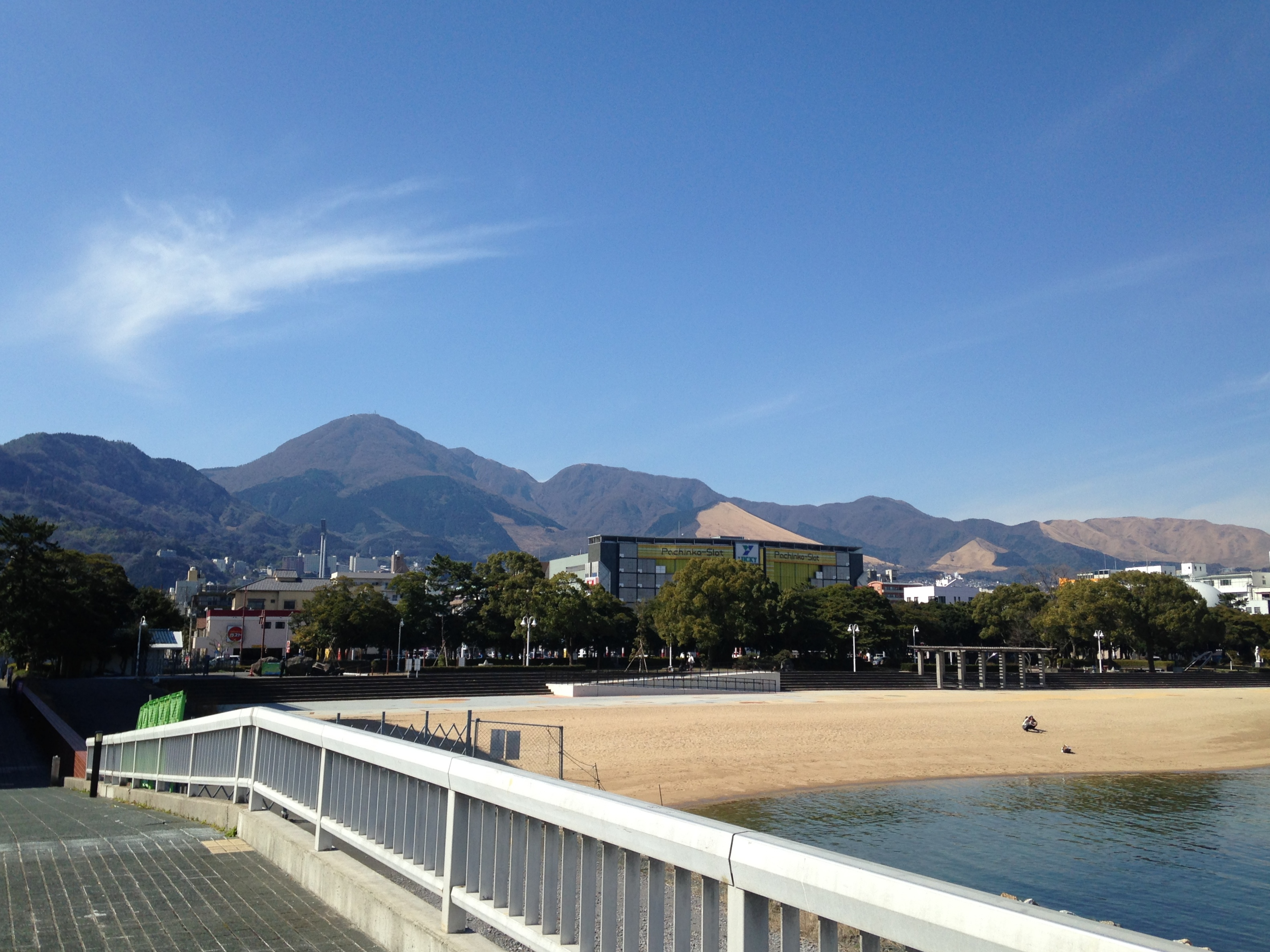
ESE side

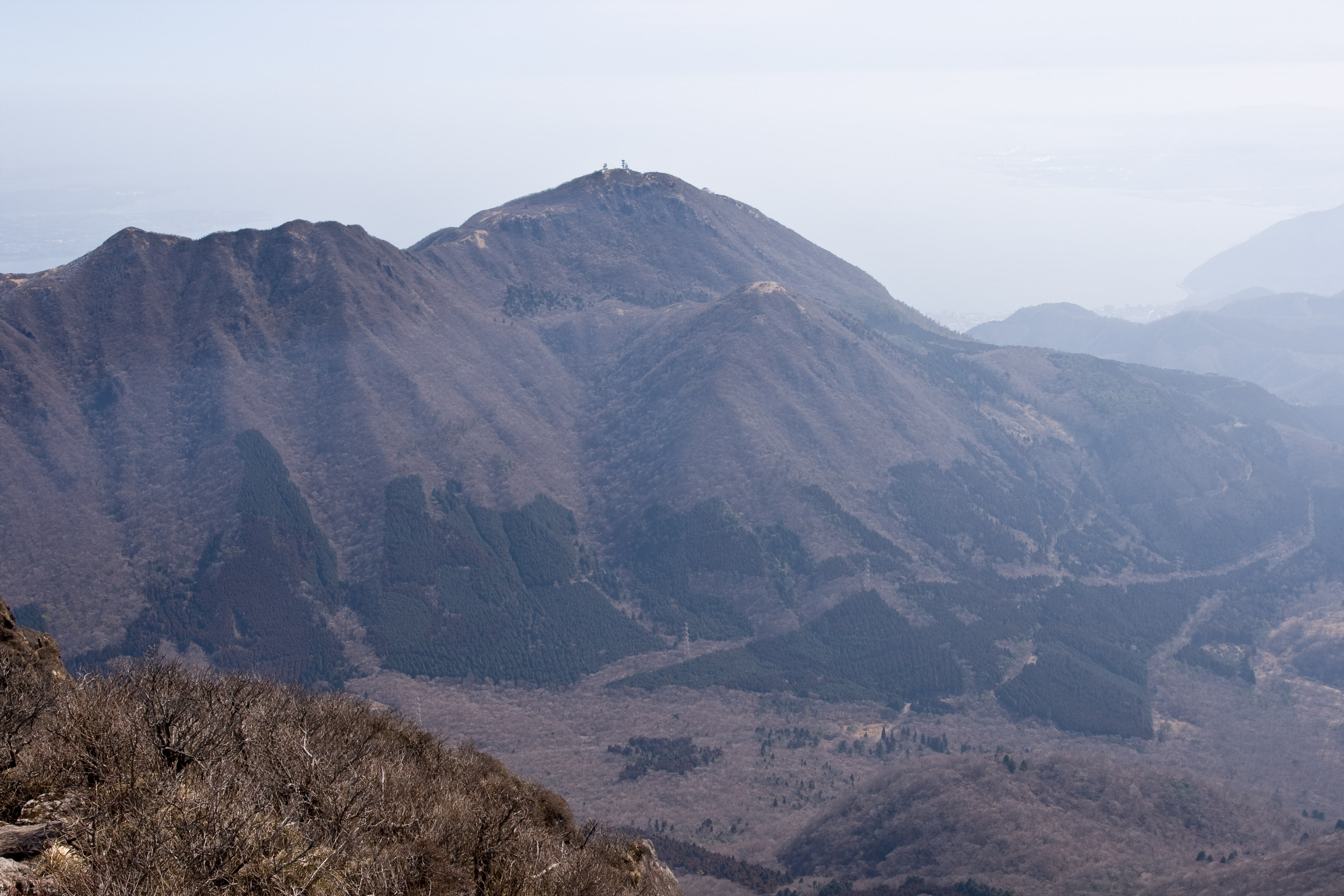
West side

== See also ==
- List of volcanoes in Japan
