= Beppu Tower =

- 別府タワー
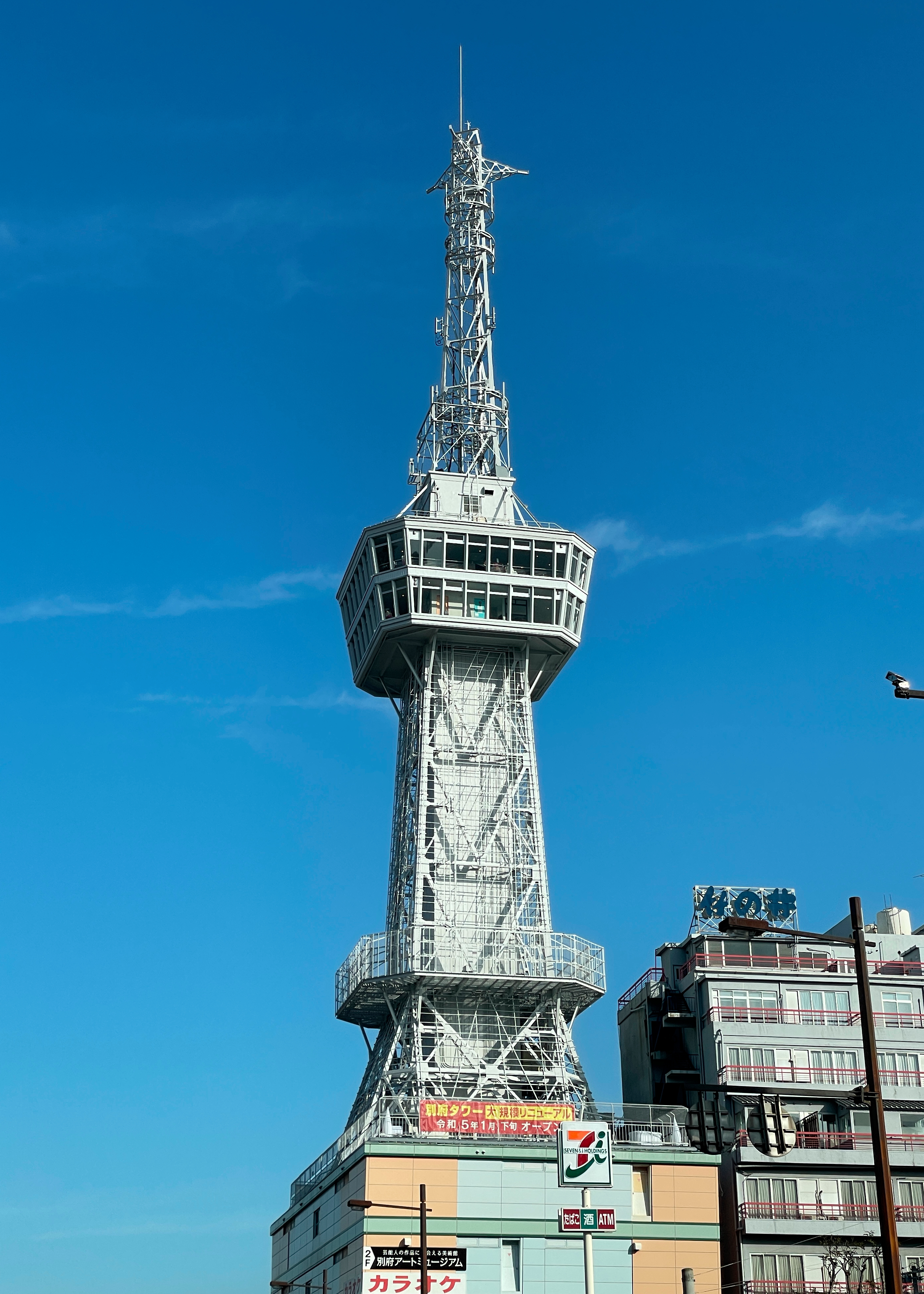

General information
- Type: Communications tower Observation tower
- Location: 3-10-2 Kitahama, Beppu, Ōita
- Coordinates: 33°16′54″N 131°30′20.8″E
- Construction started: 1956
- Completed: 1957
- Opening: May 10, 1957
- Cost: ¥280 million ($777,777 in 1956)

Height
- Antenna spire: 100 metres (328 ft)

Design and construction
- Architect: Tachū Naitō

Beppu Tower (別府タワー, Beppu Tawā) is a 100-meter-tall (330-foot) lattice tower located in Beppu, Ōita, Japan. Initially built to help boost tourism in the area, today the tower is primarily used as TV transmission tower. It has an observation deck at a height of 55 metres (180 ft).

== History ==
Beppu Tower was built in two years, from 1956 to 1957 and was originally planned to open the Beppu Tourism Exhibition, held from March 20 through May 20, 1957. Construction was slightly delayed, however, and the tower was not completed until May 10, ten days before the exhibition ended. Its original name was Sightseeing Center TV Tower (観光センターテレビ塔, Kankō-sentā-terebitō) until 1961 when it was officially changed to Beppu Tower.

The tower first displayed advertising for National. Currently, it displays eight neon Asahi signs—four in English, four in Japanese. Beppu Tower was designated a Registered Tangible Cultural Property of Japan in 2007, and it has long been regarded as a symbol of Beppu overlooking Beppu Bay. It is one of the towers designed by Tachū Naitō, a leading authority on tall structures, and is grouped with Tokyo Tower, Tsutenkaku and others as the "six tower brothers". It is also described as the third tower of its kind built in Japan, older than Tokyo Tower.

Visitors often describe the tower's slightly retro, Showa-era atmosphere as part of its appeal. The tower contains more than an observation deck. A second-floor gallery, the Beppu Art Museum, displays works by well-known figures. According to Asoview, it also has restaurants, a bar, karaoke rooms, a local souvenir shop and a 16th-floor lounge, CELINE, which stays open until 1 a.m., after the observation deck closes. Free Wi-Fi and coin lockers are available, but re-entry, pets and outside food and drink are not allowed.

== In popular culture ==
- Godzilla vs. SpaceGodzilla

== See also ==
- List of towers
