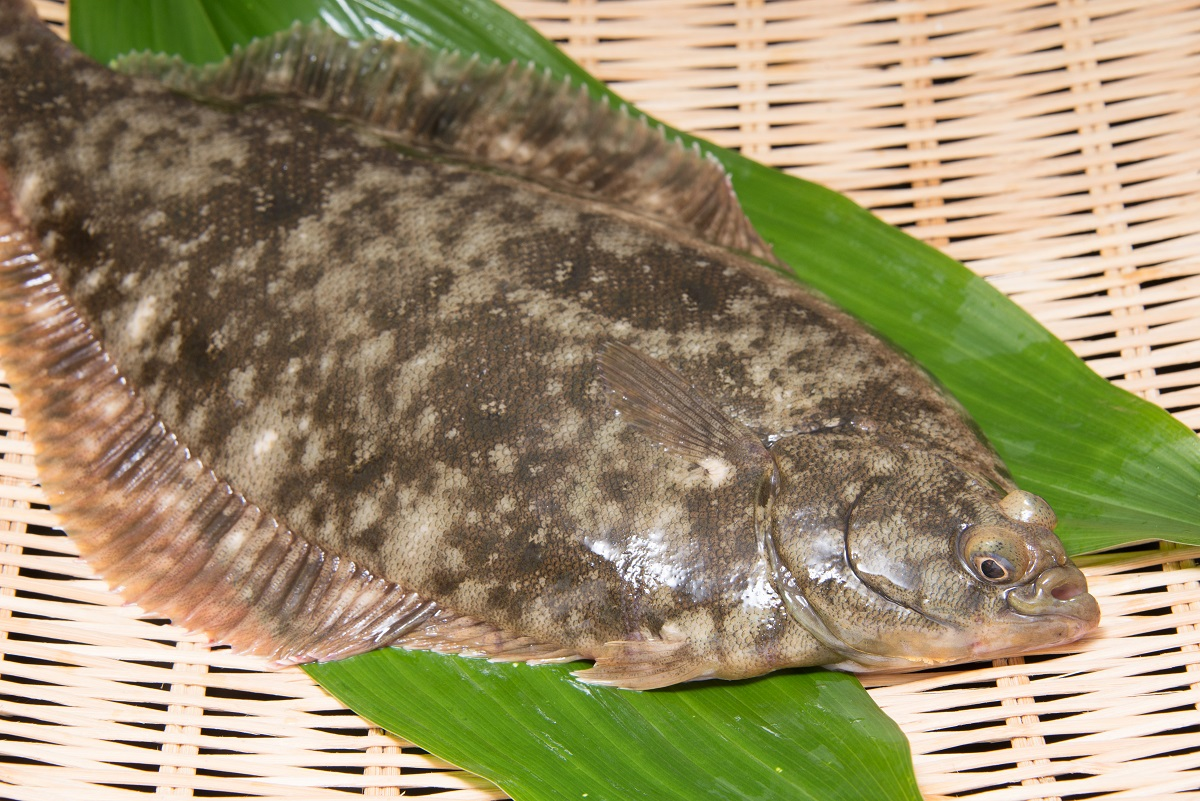
- Shiroshita Karei, Pleuronectes yokohamae

Conservation status
- Near Threatened (IUCN 3.1)

Scientific classification
- Kingdom: Animalia
- Phylum: Chordata
- Class: Actinopterygii
- Order: Carangiformes
- Suborder: Pleuronectoidei
- Family: Pleuronectidae
- Genus: Pseudopleuronectes
- Species: P. yokohamae

Binomial name
- Pseudopleuronectes yokohamae (Günther, 1877)

Synonyms
- Pleuronectes yokohamae Günther, 1877; Limanda yokohamae (Günther, 1877)

= Marbled flounder =

Species of fish

The marbled flounder, Pseudopleuronectes yokohamae, is a flatfish of the family Pleuronectidae. It is a demersal fish that lives on saltwater sand and mud bottoms. Its natural habitat is the temperate coastal waters of the northwestern Pacific, from southern Hokkaido, Japan, to the Yellow Sea, Gulf of Bohai, East China Sea and Korean Peninsula. It can grow up to 45 centimetres (18 in) in length, and its maximum recorded weight is 1.9 kilograms (4.2 lb).

== Diet ==
The diet of the marbled flounder consists primarily of benthic organisms such as amphipods, polychaetes, shrimps, crabs and other benthos crustaceans.

== As food ==
In Japan, the marbled flounder is found in Beppu Bay, and considered a specialty in the town of Hiji, where it is called shiroshita karei ("under-the-castle flounder"), because it is caught under the waters of Hiji Castle. The town holds an annual flounder festival. It is eaten raw in sashimi, in soups, or deep fried.

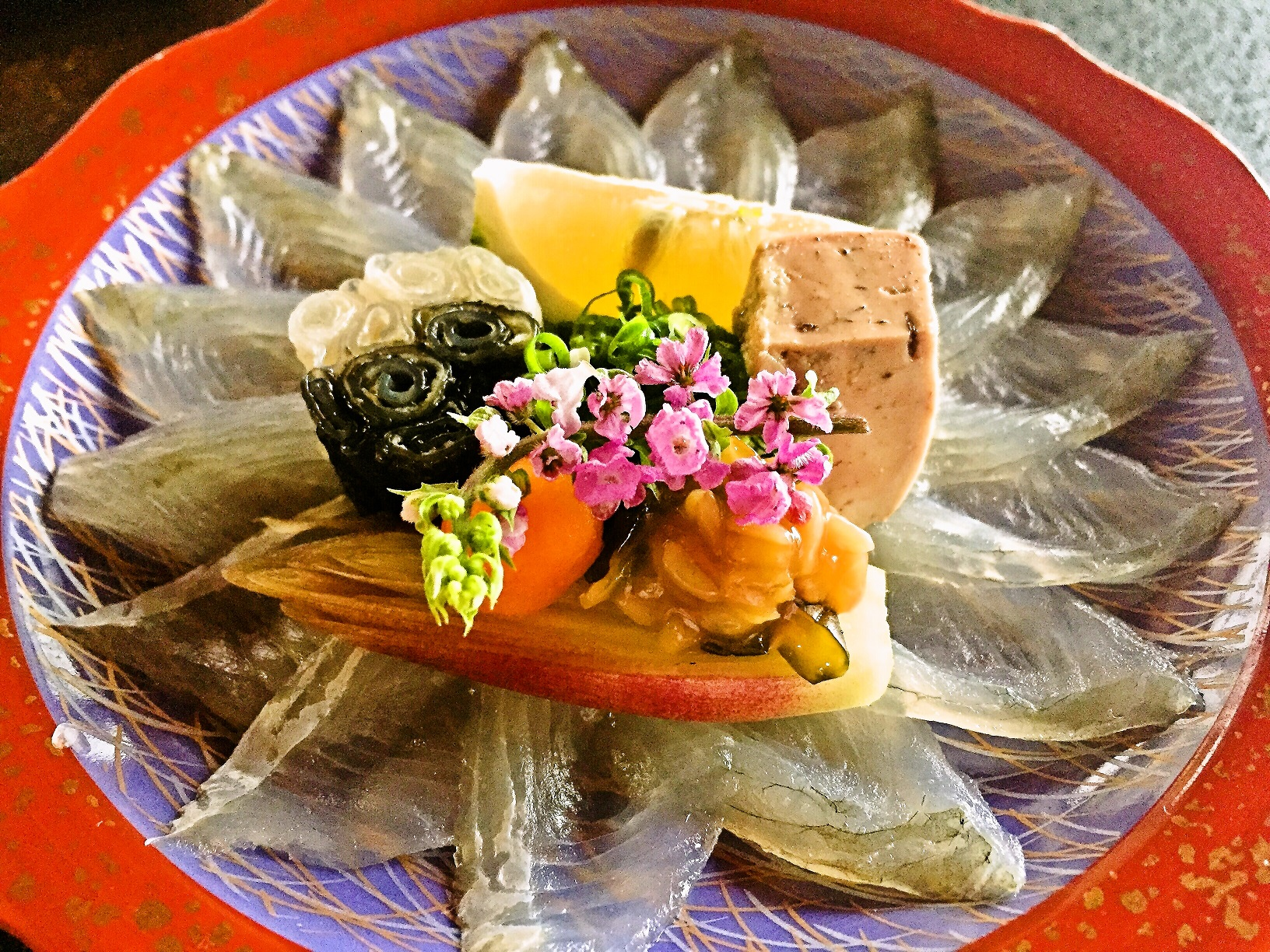
Sashimi

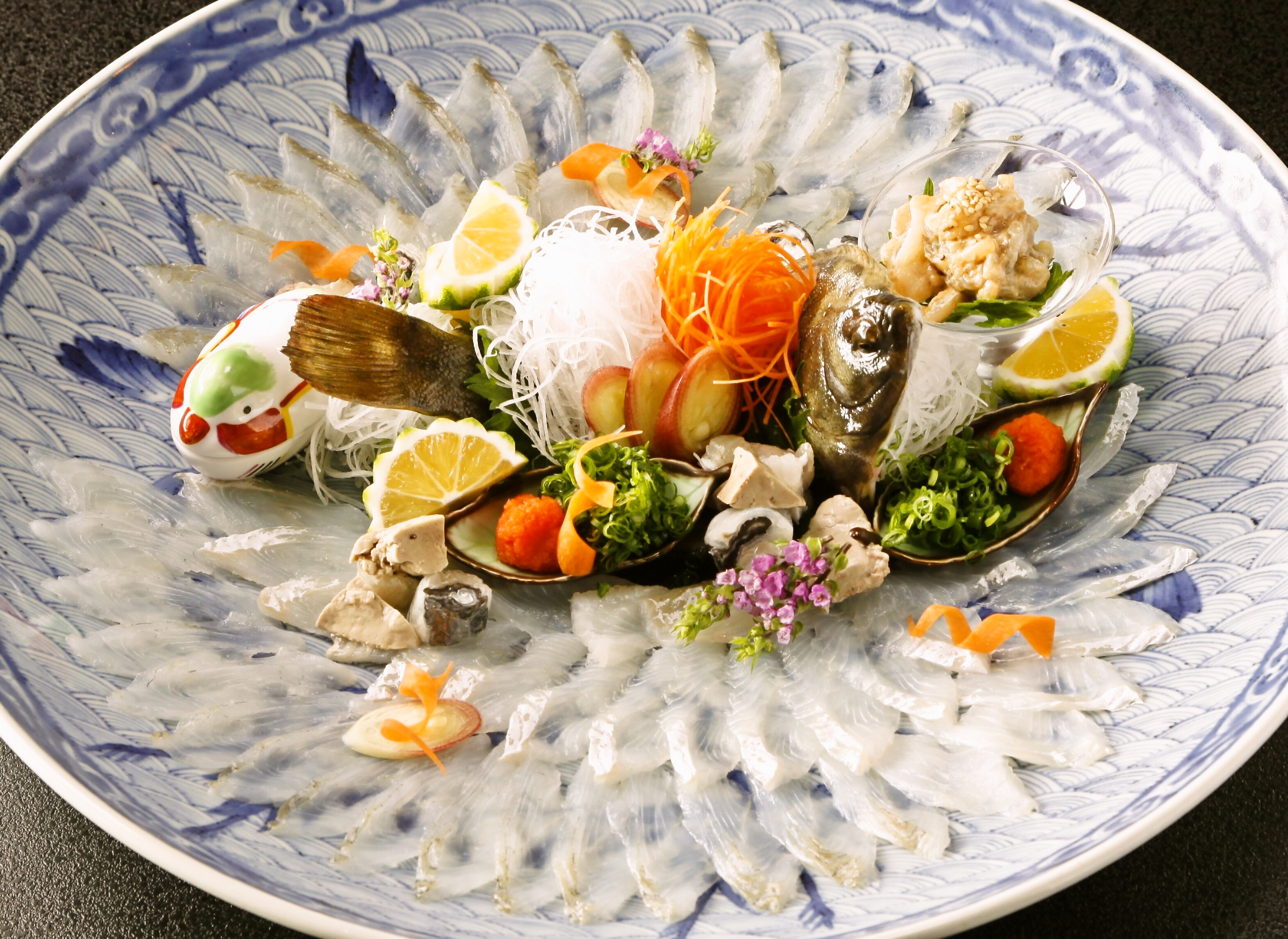

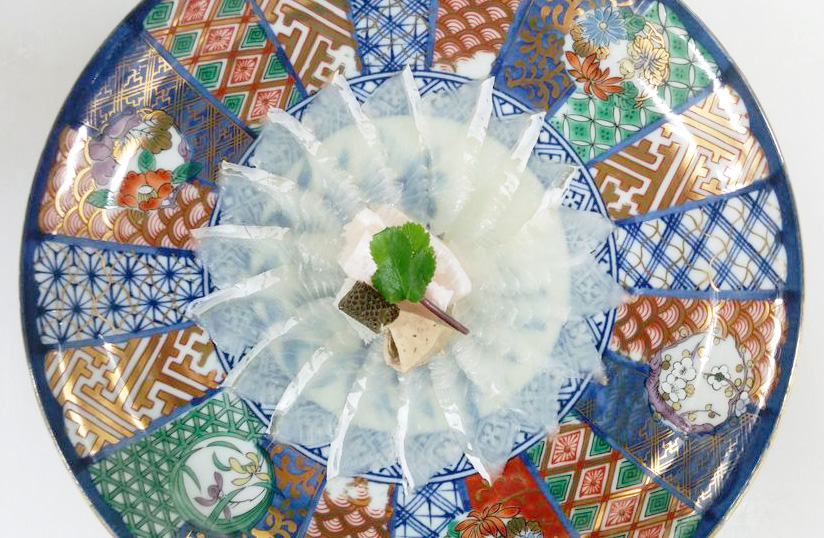
