= Kamegawa Station =

Railway station in Beppu, Ōita Prefecture, Japan

Kamegawa Station 亀川駅
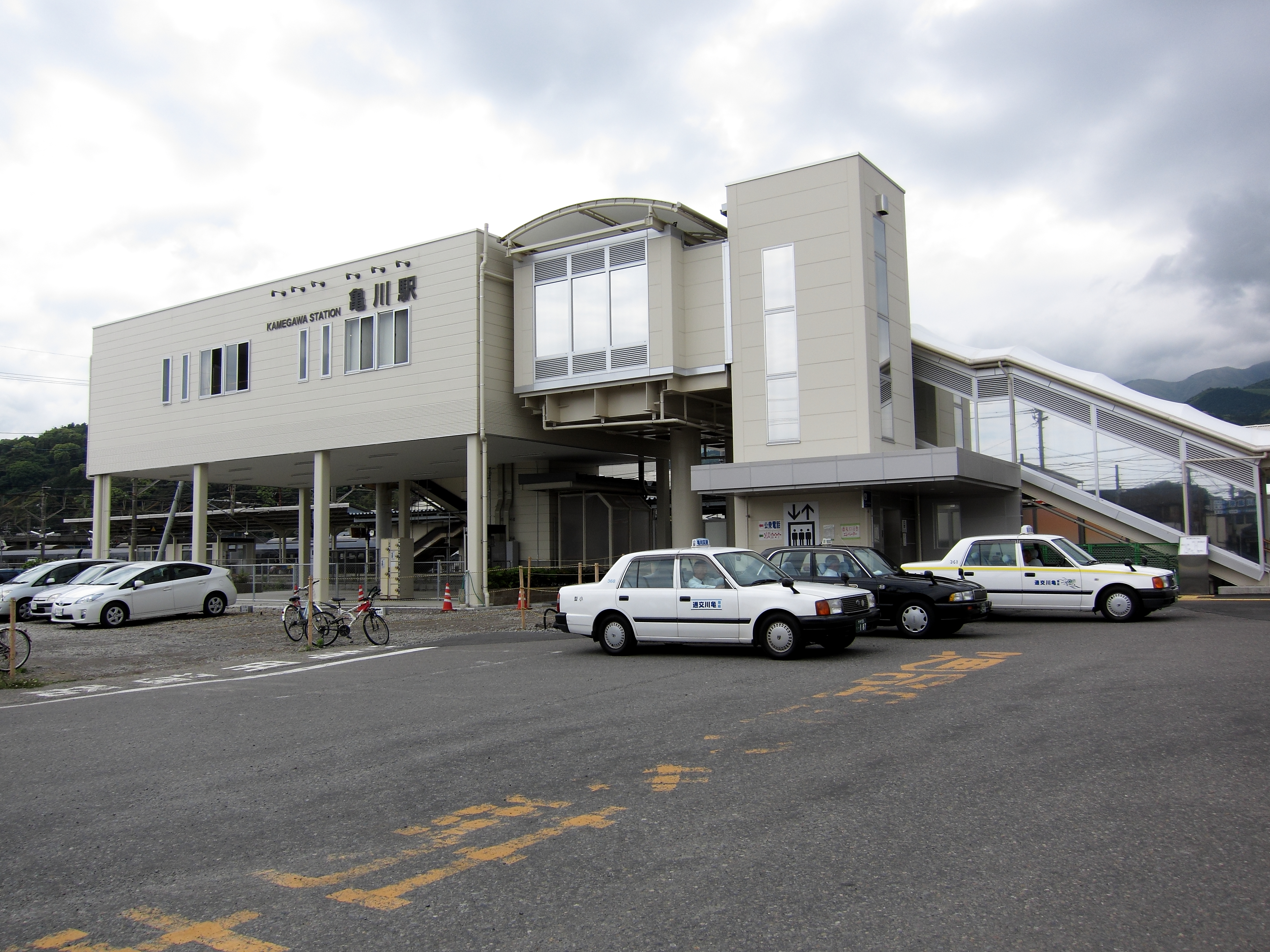
- Kamegawa Station in June 2011

General information
- Location: 2 Kamegawahamadamachi, Beppu-shi, Ōita 874-0014; Japan
- Coordinates: 33°19′53″N 131°29′35″E
- Operator: JR Kyushu
- Line: ■ Nippō Main Line
- Distance: 114.9 km from Kokura
- Platforms: 1 side + 1 island platforms
- Tracks: 3 + several sidings

Construction
- Structure type: At grade
- Parking: Available
- Accessible: Yes - footbridge to platform served by elevators

Other information
- Status: Staffed (Midori no Madoguchi) (outsourced)
- Website: Official website

History
- Opened: 16 July 1911

Passengers
- FY2016: 1,546 daily
- Rank: 116th (among JR Kyushu stations)

Services
Preceding station	JR Kyushu	Following station
Beppu Daigaku towards Kagoshima	Nippō Main Line	Bungo-Toyooka towards Kokura
Location
- Location within Oita Prefecture Location within Japan

Kamegawa Station (亀川駅, Kamegawa-eki) is a passenger railway station located in the city of Beppu, Ōita Prefecture, Japan. It is operated by JR Kyushu.

== Lines ==
The station is served by the Nippō Main Line and is located 114.9 km from the starting point of the line at Kokura.

== Layout ==
The station consists of a side platform and an island platform serving three tracks at grade with several sidings branching off. The station building is located on the west side of the tracks and is a modern hashigami structure where the station facilities are located on a bridge spanning the tracks. An enclosed waiting room, a staffed ticket window and an automatic ticket machine are located all on level 2 of the building which can be accessed from street level by means of steps or an elevator. After the ticket gate, separate sets of elevators lead to the platforms. The bridge also serves as a free passage, with a separate entrance to the station on the west side of the tracks.

Management of the station has been outsourced to the JR Kyushu Tetsudou Eigyou Co., a wholly owned subsidiary of JR Kyushu specialising in station services. It staffs the ticket booth which is equipped with a Midori no Madoguchi facility.

=== Platforms ===
1	■ ■ Nippō Main Line	for Beppu and Ōita
2, 3	■ ■ Nippō Main Line	for Nakatsu and Kokura

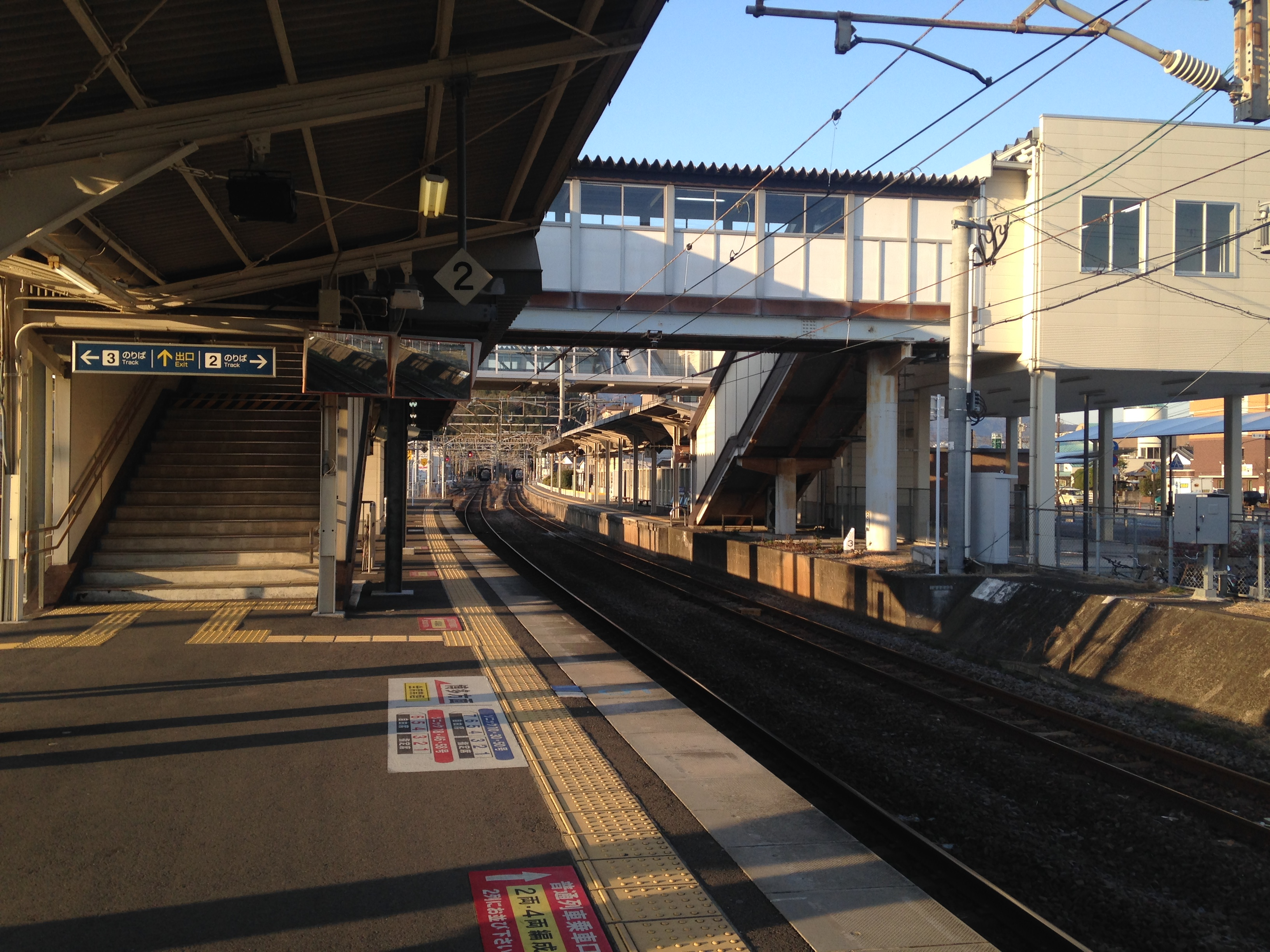
The island platform to the left, side platform to the right. Note the bridge above.

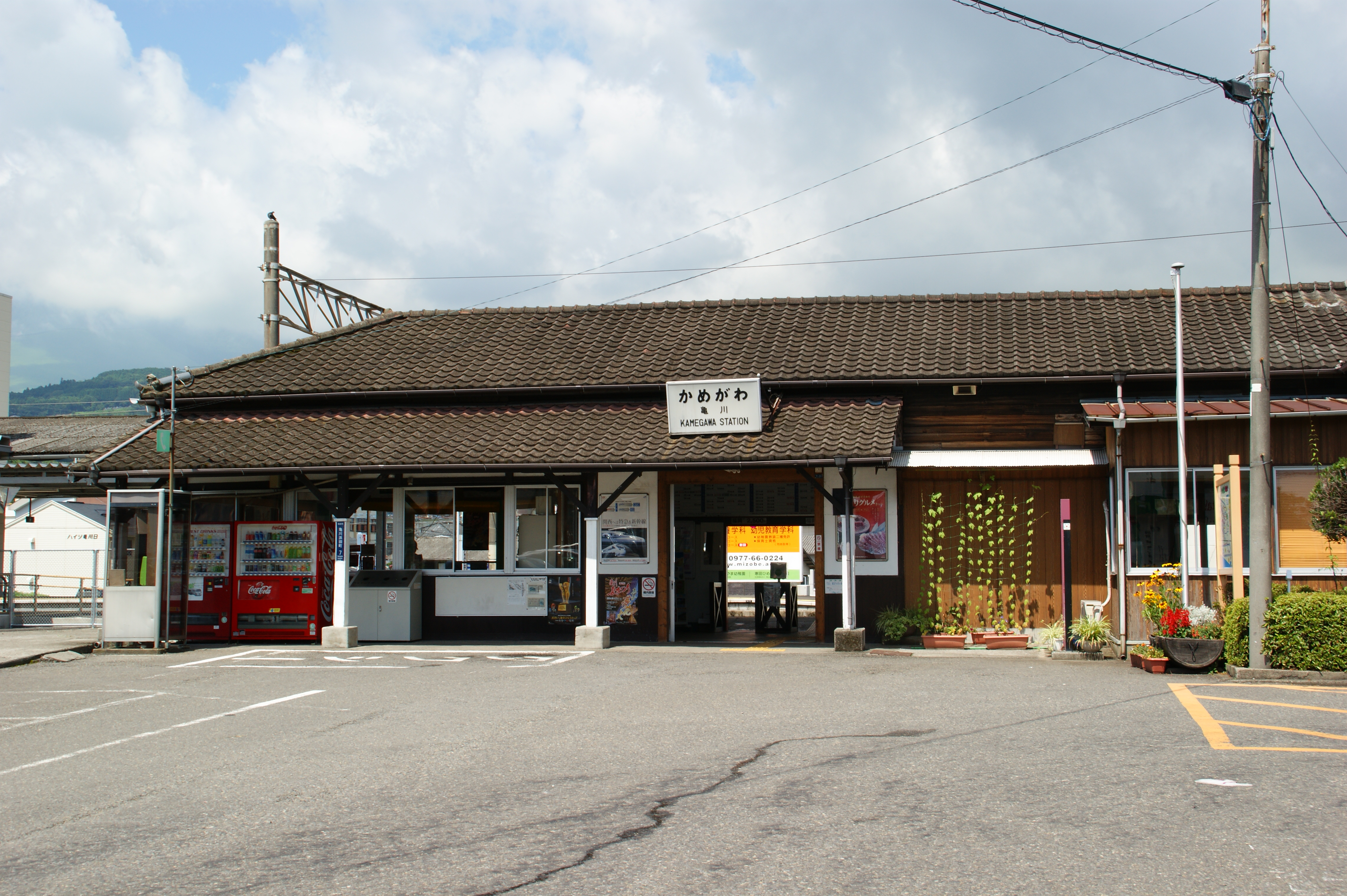
The old station building. This picture was taken in 2008.

== History ==
The private Kyushu Railway had, by 1909, through acquisition and its own expansion, established a track from Kokura to Yanagigaura. The Kyushu Railway was nationalised on 1 July 1907. Japanese Government Railways (JGR), designated the track as the Hōshū Main Line on 12 October 1909 and expanded it southwards in phases, with Beppu opening as the new southern terminus on 16 July 1911. On the same day, Kamegawa was opened as an intermediate station on the new track. With the privatization of Japanese National Railways (JNR), the successor of JGR, on 1 April 1987, the station came under the control of JR Kyushu.

== Passenger statistics ==
In fiscal 2016, the station was used by an average of 1,546 passengers daily (boarding passengers only), and it ranked 116th among the busiest stations of JR Kyushu.

== Surrounding area ==
- Kamegawa Onsen
- Beppu City Kamegawa Elementary School
- Beppu City Northern Junior High School
- Ritsumeikan Asia Pacific University - Many domestic and international students live around Kamegawa Station

== See also ==
- List of railway stations in Japan
