= Ōga Station =

Railway station in Hiji, Ōita Prefecture, Japan

Ōga Station 大神駅
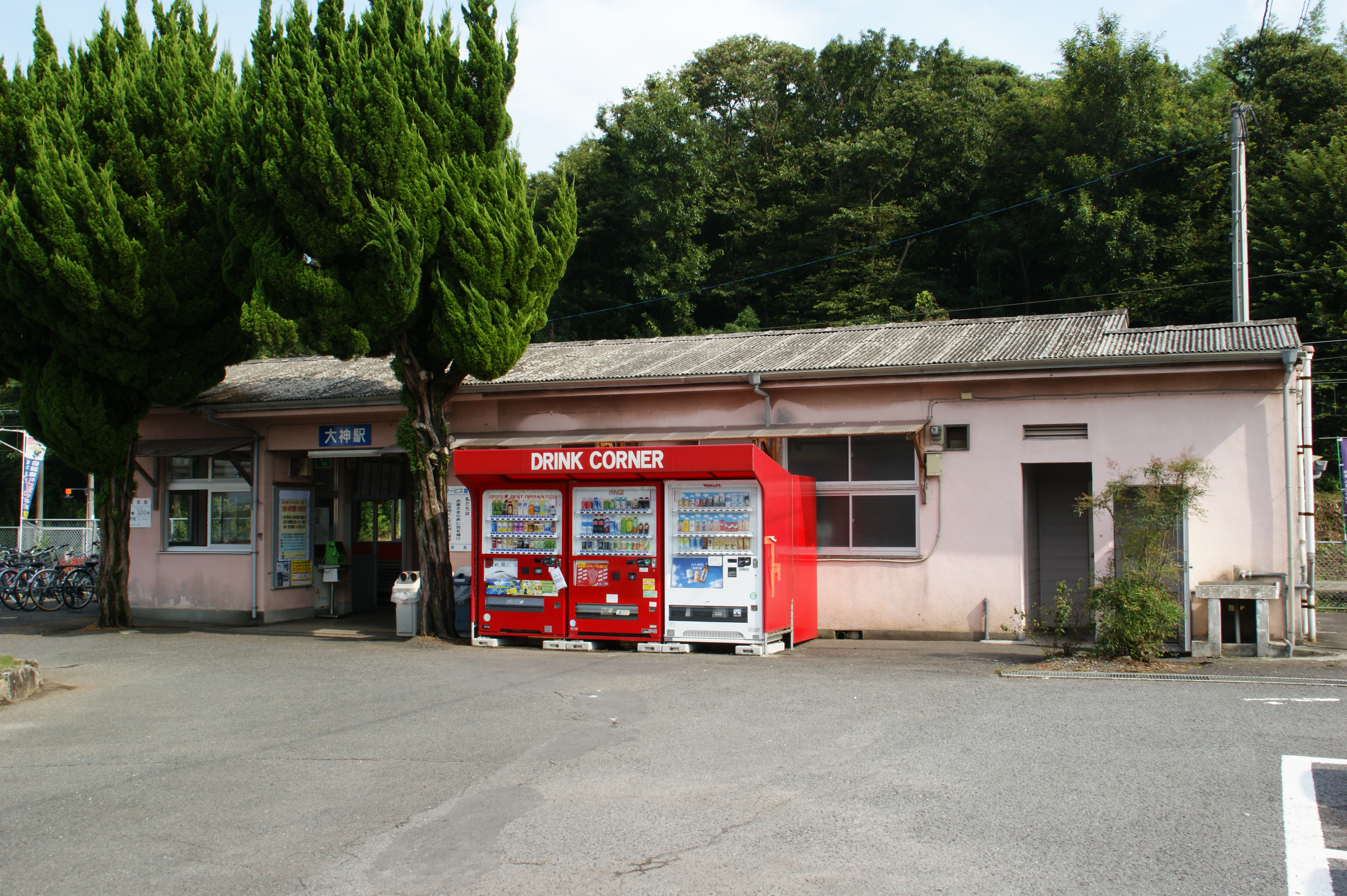
- Ōga Station in August 2008

General information
- Location: Oga, Hiji-cho, Hayami-gun, Oita-ken 879-1504; Japan
- Coordinates: 33°23′01″N 131°34′30″E
- Operator: JR Kyushu
- Line: ■ Nippō Main Line
- Distance: 103.3 km from Kokura
- Platforms: 1 island platform
- Tracks: 2

Construction
- Structure type: At grade
- Accessible: No - level crossing to platform has steps

Other information
- Status: Staffed ticket window (outsourced)
- Website: Official website

History
- Opened: 1 June 1952

Passengers
- FY2016: 481 daily
- Rank: 248th (among JR Kyushu stations)

Services
Preceding station	JR Kyushu	Following station
Hiji towards Kagoshima	Nippō Main Line	Kitsuki towards Kokura
Location
- Location within Oita Prefecture Location within Japan

Ōga Station (大神駅, Ōga-eki) is a passenger railway station located in the town of Hiji, Ōita Prefecture, Japan. It is operated by JR Kyushu.

== Lines ==
The station is served by the Nippō Main Line and is located 103.3 km from the starting point of the line at Kokura.

== Layout ==
The station consists of an island platform serving two tracks at grade. The station building is a modern concrete structure which houses an enclosed waiting room and a staffed ticket window. Access to the island platform is by means of a level crossing with steps at both ends.

Management of the station has been outsourced to the JR Kyushu Tetsudou Eigyou Co., a wholly owned subsidiary of JR Kyushu specialising in station services. It staffs the ticket booth which is equipped with a POS machine but does not have a Midori no Madoguchi facility.

=== Platforms ===
1	■ ■ Nippō Main Line	for Nakatsu and Kokura
2	■ ■ Nippō Main Line	for Beppu and Ōita

== History ==
Japanese National Railways (JNR) opened the station on 1 June 1952 as an additional station on the existing track of the Nippō Main Line. With the privatization of JNR on 1 April 1987, the station came under the control of JR Kyushu.

== Passenger statistics ==
In fiscal 2016, the station was used by an average of 481 passengers daily (boarding passengers only), and it ranked 248th among the busiest stations of JR Kyushu.

== Surrounding area ==
- Oita Prefectural Hiji Special Needs Education School
- Oita Prefectural Hidashidani High School
- Oita Prefectural Hiji Sogo High School

== See also ==
- List of railway stations in Japan
