= Yōkoku Station =

Railway station in Hiji, Ōita Prefecture, Japan

Yōkoku Station 杵築駅
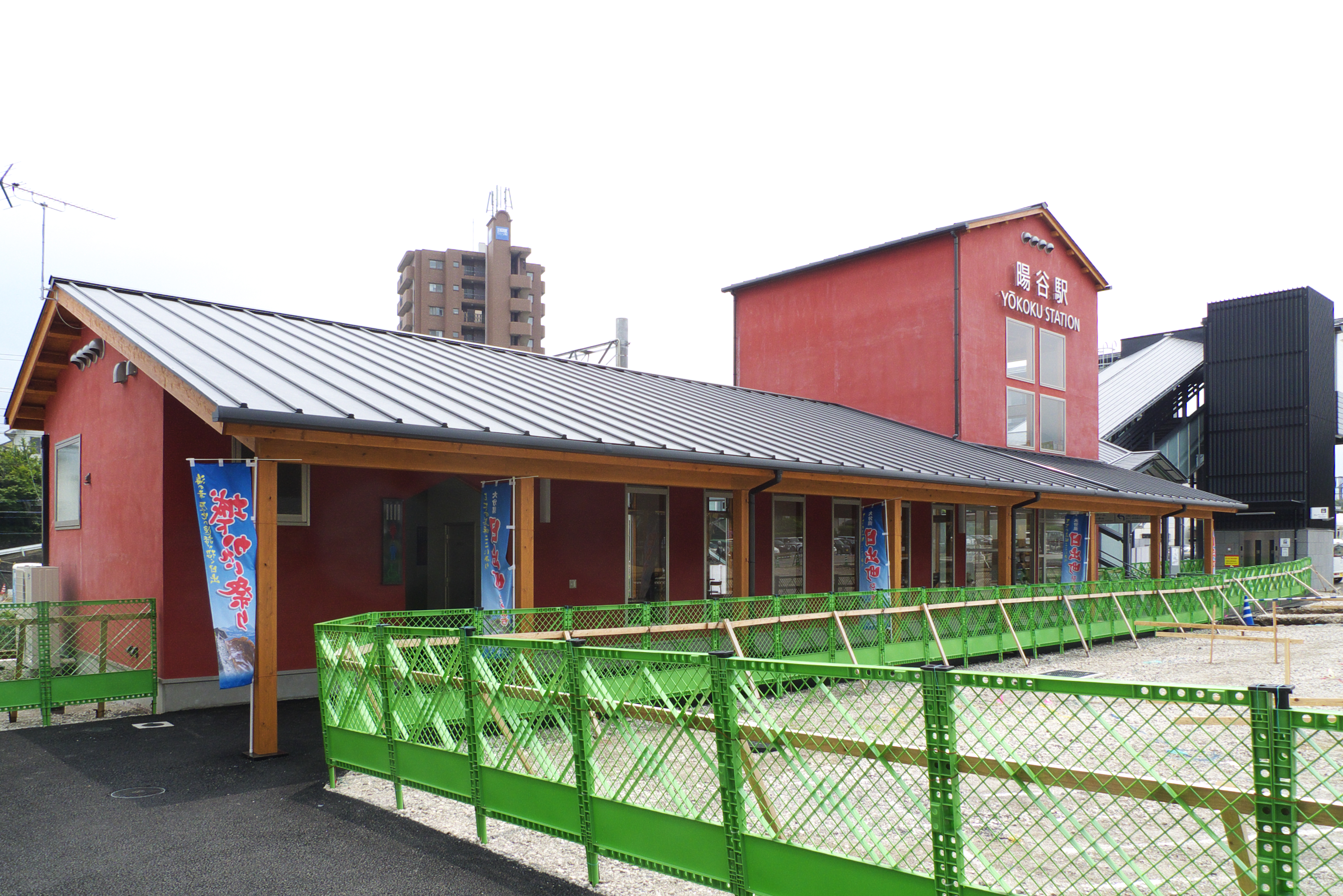
- Yōkoku Station in June 2016

General information
- Location: Hiji-cho, Hayami-gun, Oita-ken 879-1506; Japan
- Coordinates: 33°22′12″N 131°31′48″E
- Operator: JR Kyushu
- Line: ■ Nippō Main Line
- Distance: 108.4 km from Kokura
- Platforms: 2 side platforms
- Tracks: 2

Construction
- Structure type: At grade
- Accessible: Yes - footbridge to platform served by elevators

Other information
- Status: Staffed ticket window (outsourced)
- Website: Official website

History
- Opened: 9 March 1987

Passengers
- FY2016: 810 daily
- Rank: 189th (among JR Kyushu stations)

Services
Preceding station	JR Kyushu	Following station
Bungo-Toyooka towards Kagoshima	Nippō Main Line	Hiji towards Kokura
Location
- Location within Oita Prefecture Location within Japan

Yōkoku Station (暘谷駅, Yōkoku-eki) is a passenger railway station located in the town of Hiji, Ōita Prefecture, Japan. It is operated by JR Kyushu.

== Lines ==
The station is served by the Nippō Main Line and is located 108.4 km from the starting point of the line at Kokura.

== Layout ==
The station consists of two side platforms serving two tracks at grade. The station building is a modern concrete structure, built in 2016, which houses a staffed ticket window, a waiting area and various community facilities. There is also a footbridge, served by elevators, which provides access to the opposite platform as well as 24-hour free passage to the street on the other side of the station.

Management of the station has been outsourced to the JR Kyushu Tetsudou Eigyou Co., a wholly owned subsidiary of JR Kyushu specialising in station services. It staffs the ticket booth which is equipped with a POS machine but does not have a Midori no Madoguchi facility.

=== Platforms ===
1	■ ■ Nippō Main Line	for Beppu and Ōita
2	■ ■ Nippō Main Line	for Nakatsu and Kokura

== History ==
Japanese National Railways (JNR) opened the station on 9 March 1987 as an additional station on the existing track of the Nippō Main Line. With the privatization of JNR on 1 April 1987, the station came under the control of JR Kyushu.

In 2016, the town of Hiji completed a major urban redevelopment project involving the station. The station was moved 100 metres to the east and a new station building was constructed, incorporated a waiting room, a community interaction area and gallery as well as a footbridge which is available as a free passage to the street on the other side of the tracks.

== Passenger statistics ==
In fiscal 2016, the station was used by an average of 810 passengers daily (boarding passengers only), and it ranked 189th among the busiest stations of JR Kyushu.

== Surrounding area ==
- Hiji Town Hall
- Hiji Town Hiji Library
- Hiji Town Hiji Elementary School
- Hiji Town Hiji Junior High School

== See also ==
- List of railway stations in Japan
