= Hiji Station =

Railway station in Hiji, Ōita Prefecture, Japan

Hiji Station 日出駅
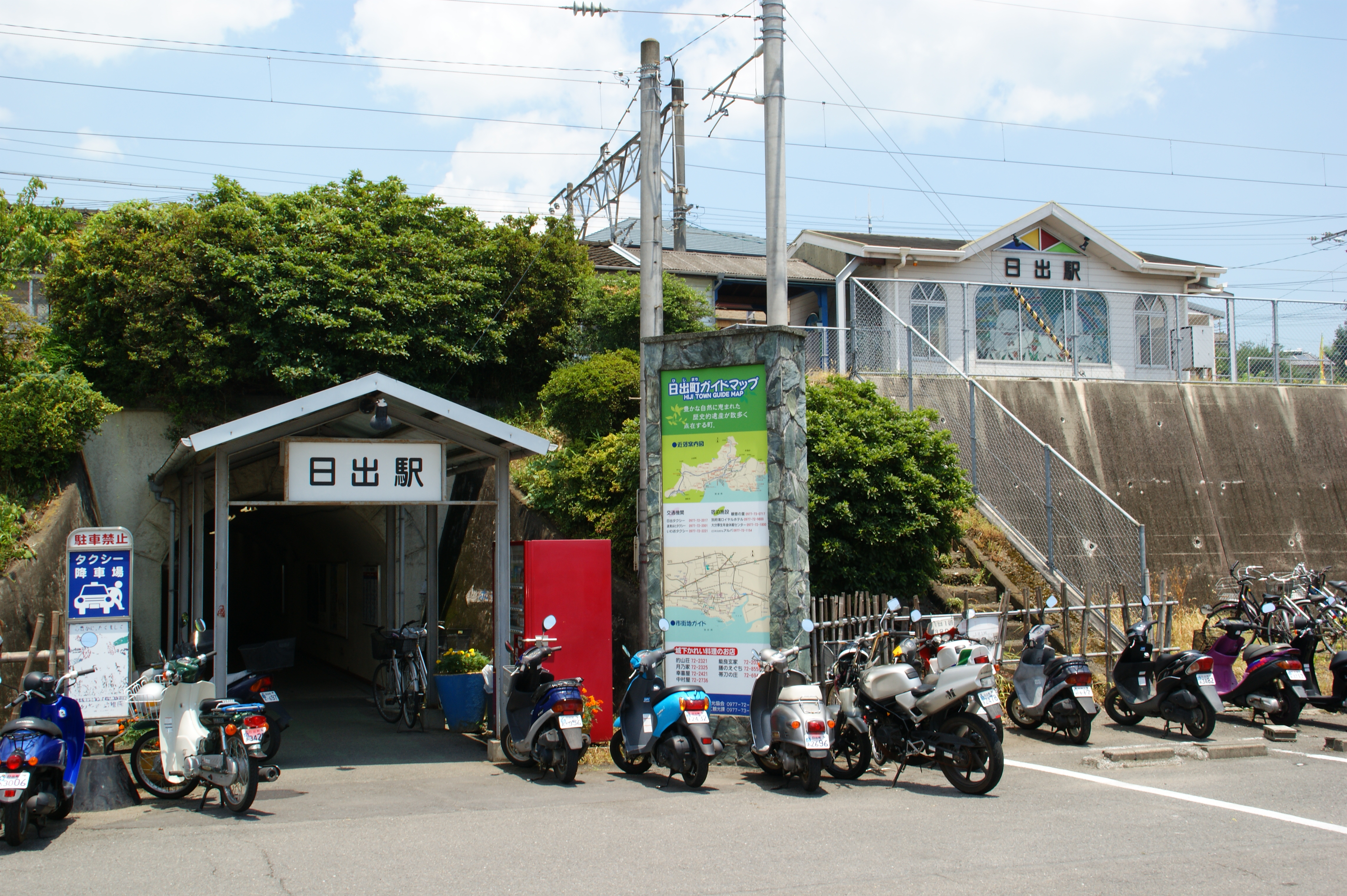
- Hiji Station in July 2008

General information
- Location: Kawasaki, Hiji-cho, Hayami-gun, Oita-ken 879-1505; Japan
- Coordinates: 33°22′09″N 131°32′32″E
- Operator: JR Kyushu
- Line: ■ Nippō Main Line
- Distance: 107.2 km from Kokura
- Platforms: 1 island platform
- Tracks: 2

Construction
- Structure type: Embankment
- Accessible: No - steps up to platform

Other information
- Status: Kan'i itaku station
- Website: Official website

History
- Opened: 22 March 1911

Passengers
- FY2016: 533 daily
- Rank: 238th (among JR Kyushu stations)

Services
| Preceding station | JR Kyushu | Following station |
|---|---|---|
| Yōkoku towards Kagoshima | Nippō Main Line | Ōga towards Kokura |
Location
- Location within Oita Prefecture Location within Japan

Hiji Station (日出駅, Hiji-eki) is a passenger railway station located in the town of Hiji, Ōita Prefecture, Japan. It is operated by JR Kyushu.

== Lines ==
The station is served by the Nippō Main Line and is located 107.2 km from the starting point of the line at Kokura.

== Layout ==
The station consists of an island platform serving two tracks on an embankment. Access to the platform is by a flight of steps from within an underpass which goes through the embankment and which also serves as a free passage, connecting the streets on both sides of the tracks. A simple timber station building on the island platform houses a staffed ticket window and awaiting area.

The station is not staffed by JR Kyushu but the local town authorities act as a kan'i itaku agent manages the ticket window which is equipped with a POS machine.

=== Platforms ===
| 1 | ■ ■ Nippō Main Line | for Beppu and Ōita |
| 2 | ■ ■ Nippō Main Line | for Nakatsu and Kokura |

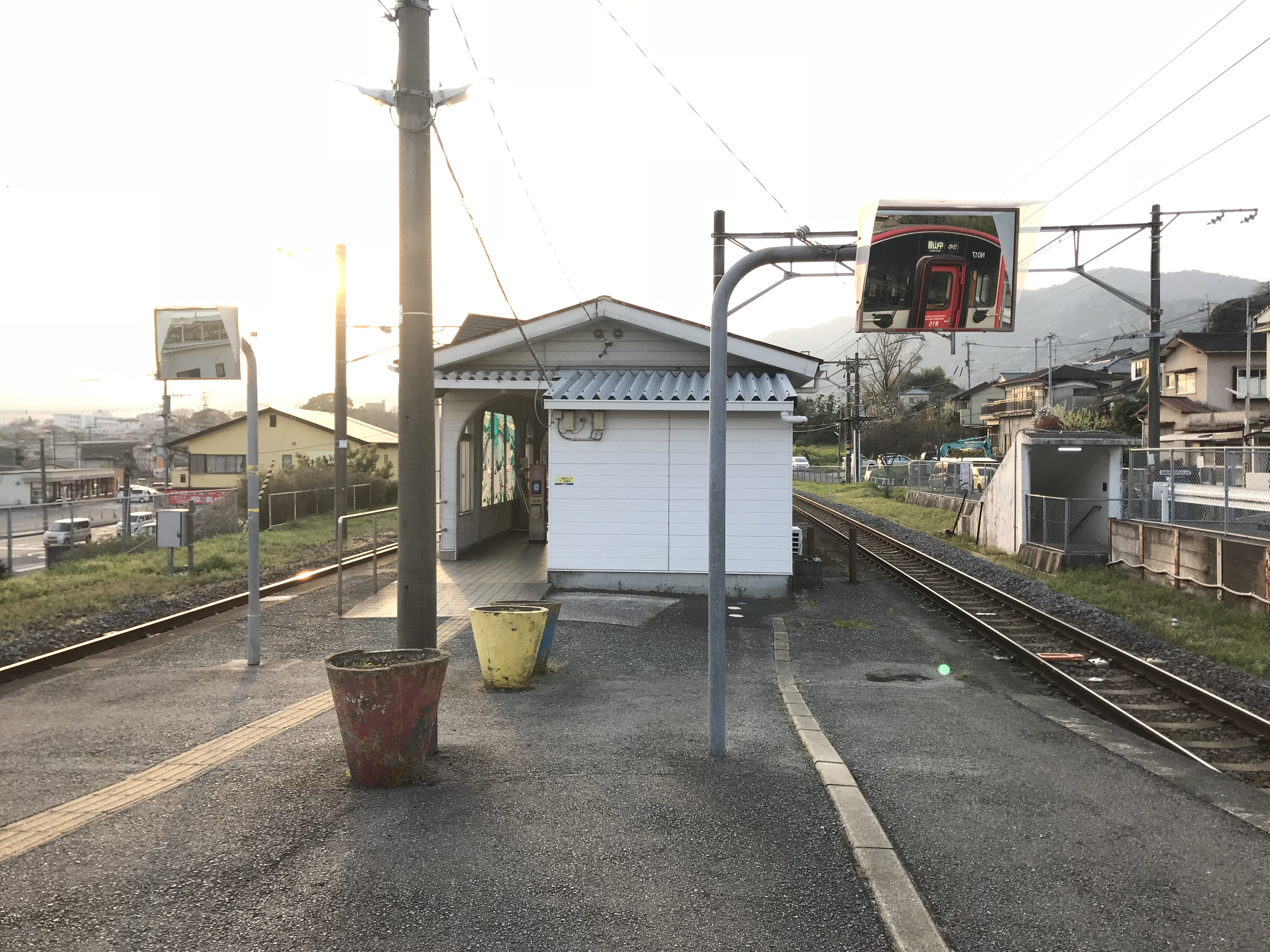
The station building sited on the island platform.

== History ==
The private Kyushu Railway had, by 1909, through acquisition and its own expansion, established a track from Kokura to Yanagigaura. The Kyushu Railway was nationalised on 1 July 1907. Japanese Government Railways (JGR), designated the track as the Hōshū Main Line on 12 October 1909 and expanded it southwards in phases, with Hiji opening as the new southern terminus on 22 March 1911. It became a through-station on 16 July 1911 when the track was extended further south to Beppu. On 15 December 1923, the Hōshū Main Line was renamed the Nippō Main Line. With the privatization of Japanese National Railways (JNR), the successor of JGR, on 1 April 1987, the station came under the control of JR Kyushu.

The station became unstaffed on 1 April 2016. In order to maintain service to the residents, the Hiji town authorities took over the staffing of the ticket window as a kan'i itaku agent.

== Passenger statistics ==
In fiscal 2016, the station was used by an average of 533 passengers daily (boarding passengers only), and it ranked 238th among the busiest stations of JR Kyushu.

== Surrounding area ==
- Japan National Route 10
- Japan National Route 213

== See also ==
- List of railway stations in Japan
