= Nishi-Ōita Station =

Railway station in Ōita, Ōita Prefecture, Japan

Nishi-Ōita Station 西大分駅
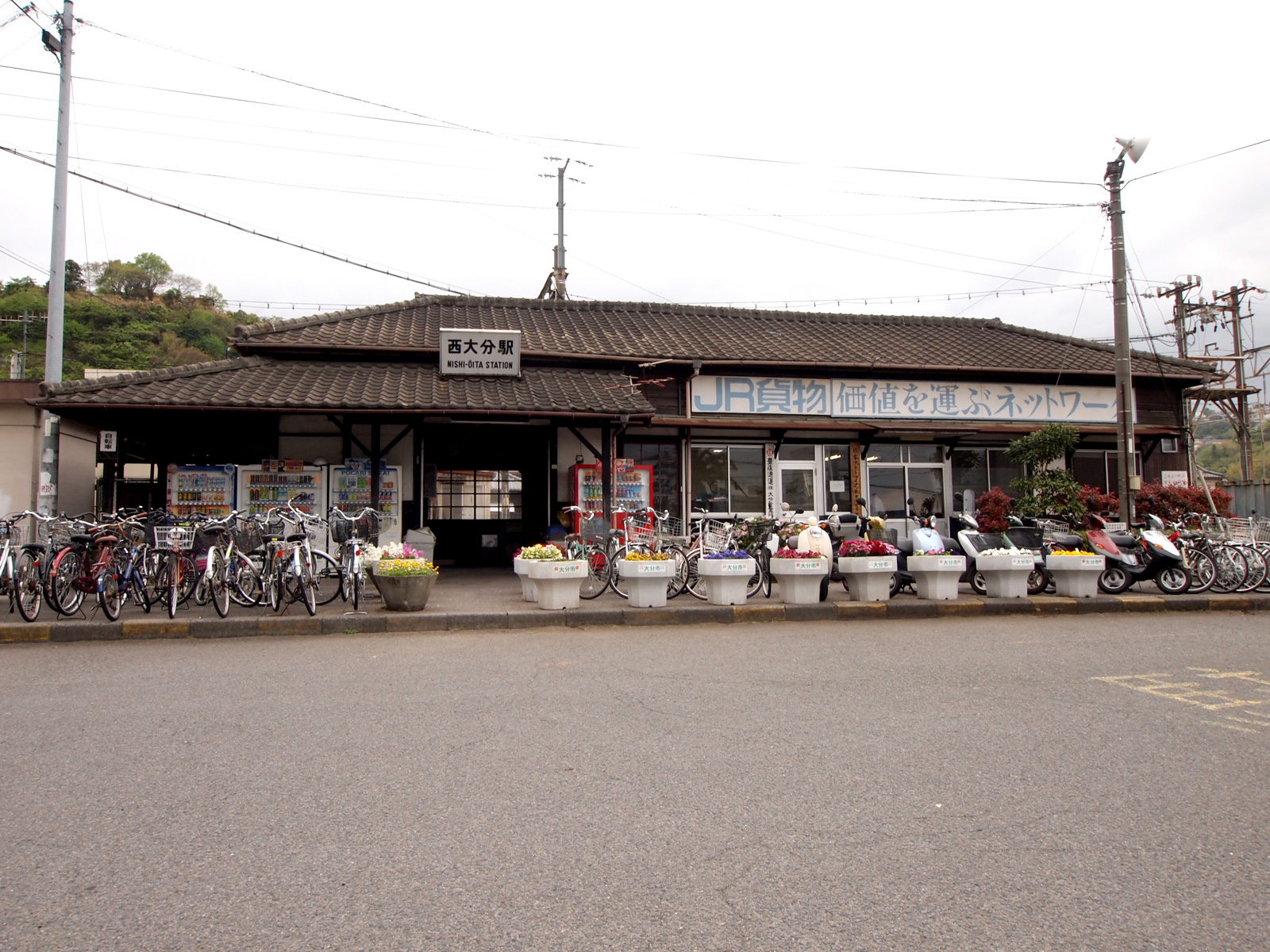
- Nishi-Ōita Station in May 2011

General information
- Location: 1-chōme-1 Hamanoichi, Ōita-shi, Ōita-ken, 870-0002; Japan
- Coordinates: 33°14′43″N 131°34′58″E
- Operator: JR Kyushu; JR Freight
- Line: ■ Nippō Main Line
- Distance: 130.4 km from Kokura
- Platforms: 1 island platform
- Tracks: 2 + numerous sidings

Construction
- Structure type: At grade

Other information
- Status: Staffed ticket window (outsourced)
- Website: Official website

History
- Opened: 1 November 1911

Passengers
- FY2016: 478 daily
- Rank: 249th (among JR Kyushu stations)

Services
Preceding station	JR Kyushu	Following station
Ōita towards Kagoshima	Nippō Main Line	Higashi-Beppu towards Kokura
Location
- Location within Oita Prefecture Location within Japan

Nishi-Ōita Station (西大分駅, Nishi-Ōita-eki) is a passenger railway station located in Ōita City, Ōita Prefecture, Japan. It is operated by JR Kyushu. It is also a freight deport for the Japan Freight Railway Company (JR Freight)

== Lines ==
The station is served by the Nippō Main Line and is located 130.4 km from the starting point of the line at Kokura.

== Layout ==
The station consists of an island platform serving two tracks at grade. The station building is an old timber structure of traditional Japanese design but is now largely used by JR Freight with only a small portion devoted to passenger waiting area. Access to the island platform is by means of a footbridge. A staffed ticket window is located on the island platform. On both sides of the island platform are numerous sidings used by JR freight.

Management of the passenger facilities at the station has been outsourced to the JR Kyushu Tetsudou Eigyou Co., a wholly owned subsidiary of JR Kyushu specialising in station services. It staffs the ticket booth on the island platform which is equipped with a POS machine but does not have a Midori no Madoguchi facility.

=== Platforms ===
3	■ ■ Nippō Main Line	for Ōita and Saiki
4	■ ■ Nippō Main Line	for Beppu and Kokura

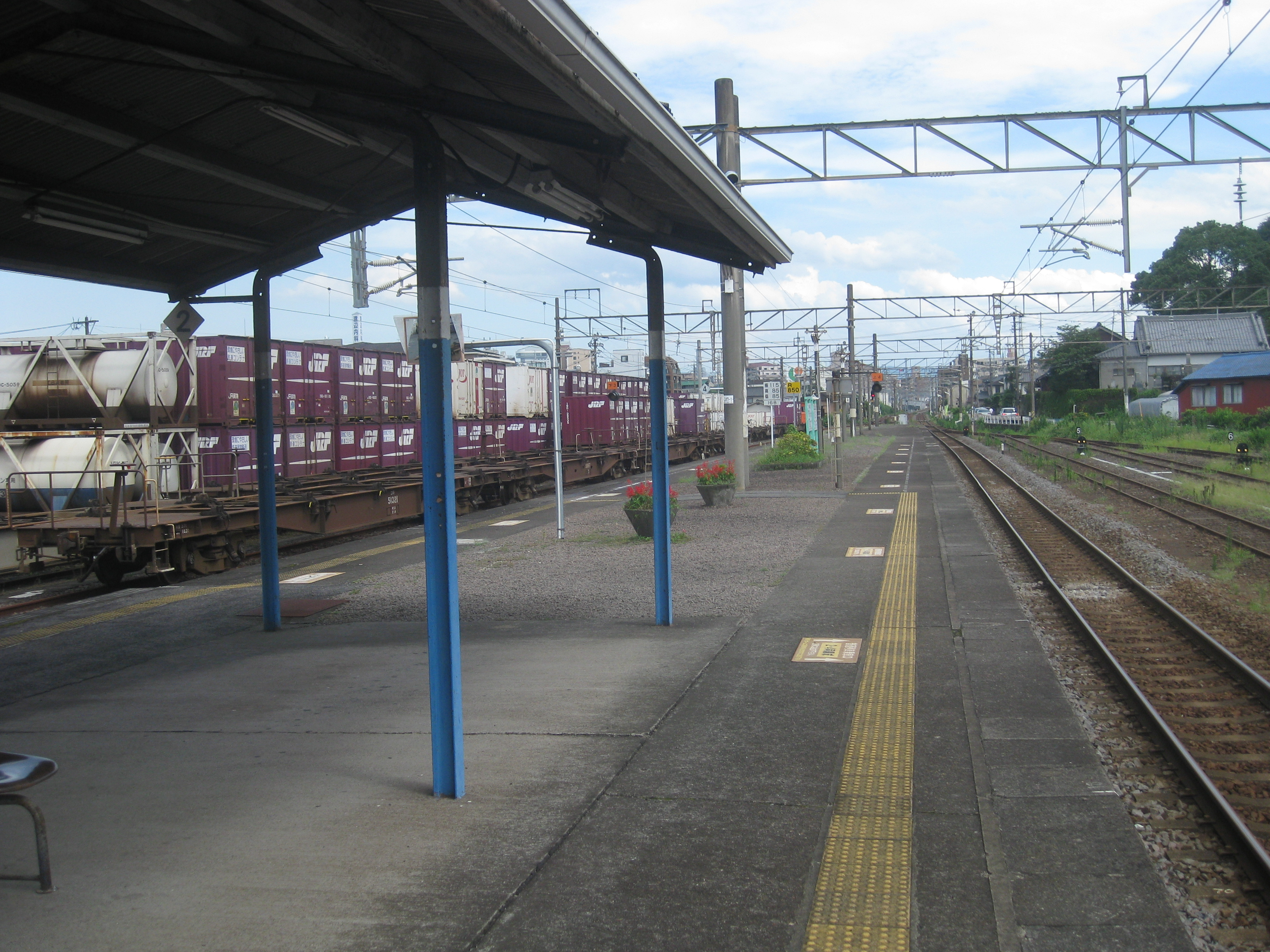
A view of the island platform.

== History ==
The private Kyushu Railway had, by 1909, through acquisition and its own expansion, established a track from Kokura to Yanagigaura. The Kyushu Railway was nationalised on 1 July 1907. Japanese Government Railways (JGR), designated the track as the Hōshū Main Line on 12 October 1909 and expanded it southwards in phases. Ōota opened as the new southern terminus on 1 November 1911 after the track was extended there from Beppu. On the same day, this station was opened as an intermediate station on the new track. On 15 December 1923, the Hōshū Main Line was renamed the Nippō Main Line. With the privatization of Japanese National Railways (JNR), the successor of JGR, on 1 April 1987, the station came under the control of JR Kyushu.

== Passenger statistics ==
In fiscal 2016, the station was used by an average of 478 passengers daily (boarding passengers only), and it ranked 249th among the busiest stations of JR Kyushu.

== Freight operations ==
On the southeast side of the station building (northeast side of the passenger platform) is a two-track container platform used by JR Freight. There is no arrival/departure track exclusively for freight trains, and the tracks parallel to the outside of the upper and lower main lines are all siding tracks. One of the siding lines on the down side touches the container platform and serves as a cargo handling line, and there is another deadhead type cargo handling line outside the container platform. These siding lines are entered via pull-up lines. The container platforms are not long enough for container trains to enter the line as a whole, and it is necessary to divide the trains or move the trains to accommodate cargo handling operations, and shunting locomotives (small diesel locomotives) are used for these operations.

== Surrounding area ==
- Yusuhara Hachimangū Shrine's mid-autumn festival, Hamanoichi, is held around the station from September 14 to 20 every year.
- Oita Port Nishi-Oita Port Ferry Terminal
- Japan National Route 10

== See also ==
- List of railway stations in Japan
