= Cresthead flounder =

Scientific classification
- Kingdom: Animalia
- Phylum: Chordata
- Class: Actinopterygii
- Order: Carangiformes
- Suborder: Pleuronectoidei
- Family: Pleuronectidae
- Genus: Pseudopleuronectes
- Species: P. schrenki

Binomial name
- Pseudopleuronectes schrenki (P. J. Schmidt, 1904)

Synonyms
- Limanda schrenki Schmidt, 1904; Pleuronectes schrenki (Schmidt, 1904)

Species of fish

The cresthead flounder (Pseudopleuronectes schrenki) is a flatfish of the family Pleuronectidae. It is a demersal fish that lives on bottoms in salt water in the temperate waters of the northwestern Pacific, from the southern parts of the Sea of Okhotsk and the Kuril Islands to Korea and northern Honshu, Japan. It can grow up to 50 centimetres (20 in) in length, though it more commonly reaches lengths of around 32.5 centimetres (12.8 in). Its maximum recorded weight is 2.5 kilograms (5.5 lb).
