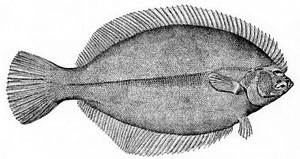
- Pseudopleuronectes americanus

Scientific classification
- Kingdom: Animalia
- Phylum: Chordata
- Class: Actinopterygii
- Order: Carangiformes
- Suborder: Pleuronectoidei
- Family: Pleuronectidae
- Subfamily: Pleuronectinae
- Genus: Pseudopleuronectes; Bleeker, 1862

Type species
- Pleuronectes planus Mitchill, 1814

Synonyms
- Gareus Hubbs, 1915; Limandella Jordan & Starks, 1906

= Pseudopleuronectes =

Genus of fishes

Pseudopleuronectes is a genus of righteye flounders mostly native to the northwestern Pacific Ocean with one species (P. americanus) found in the northwestern Atlantic Ocean.

== Species ==
There are currently five recognized species in this genus:

- Pseudopleuronectes americanus (Walbaum, 1792) (Winter flounder)
- Pseudopleuronectes herzensteini (D. S. Jordan & Snyder, 1901) (Yellow-striped flounder)
- Pseudopleuronectes obscurus (Herzenstein, 1890) (Dark flounder)
- Pseudopleuronectes schrenki (P. J. Schmidt, 1904) (Cresthead flounder)
- Pseudopleuronectes yokohamae (Günther, 1877) (Marbled flounder)
