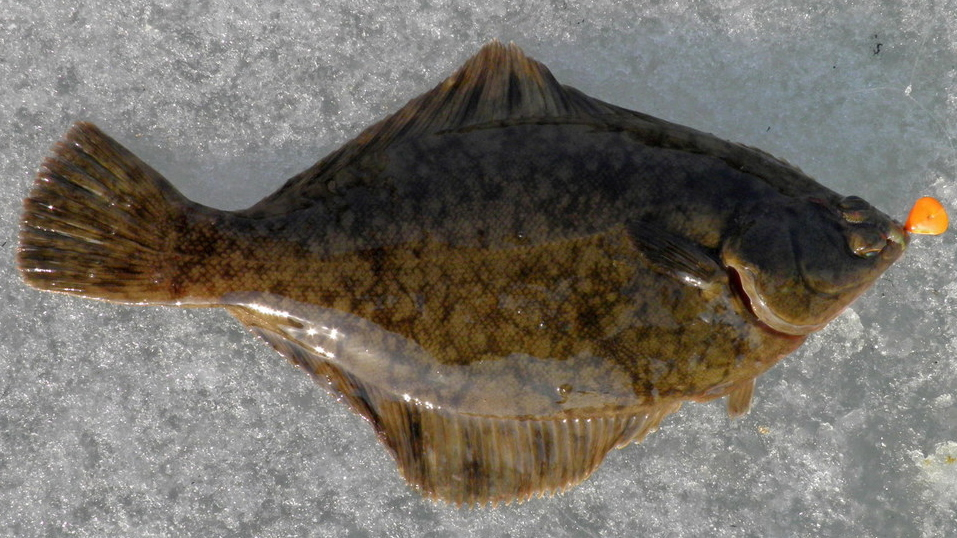

Scientific classification
- Domain: Eukaryota
- Kingdom: Animalia
- Phylum: Chordata
- Class: Actinopterygii
- Order: Carangiformes
- Suborder: Pleuronectoidei
- Family: Pleuronectidae
- Genus: Pseudopleuronectes
- Species: P. obscurus

Binomial name
- Pseudopleuronectes obscurus (Herzenstein, 1890)

Synonyms
- Pleuronectes obscurus Herzenstein, 1890; Liopsetta obscura (Herzenstein, 1890)

= Pseudopleuronectes obscurus =

Species of fish

Pseudopleuronectes obscurus, or dark flounder is a flatfish of the family Pleuronectidae. It is a demersal fish that lives on salt bottoms in the temperate waters of the northwestern Pacific, from Hokkaido to the Kuril Islands, the Sea of Okhotsk, Sakhalin and the Tatar Strait to the northeastern coast of Korea and the Yellow Sea. It can grow up to 56 centimetres (22 in) in length, though it more commonly reaches around 35 centimetres (14 in), and its maximum recorded weight is 2.6 kilograms (5.7 lb).
