= Higashi-Beppu Station =

Railway station in Beppu, Ōita Prefecture, Japan

Higashi-Beppu Station 東別府駅
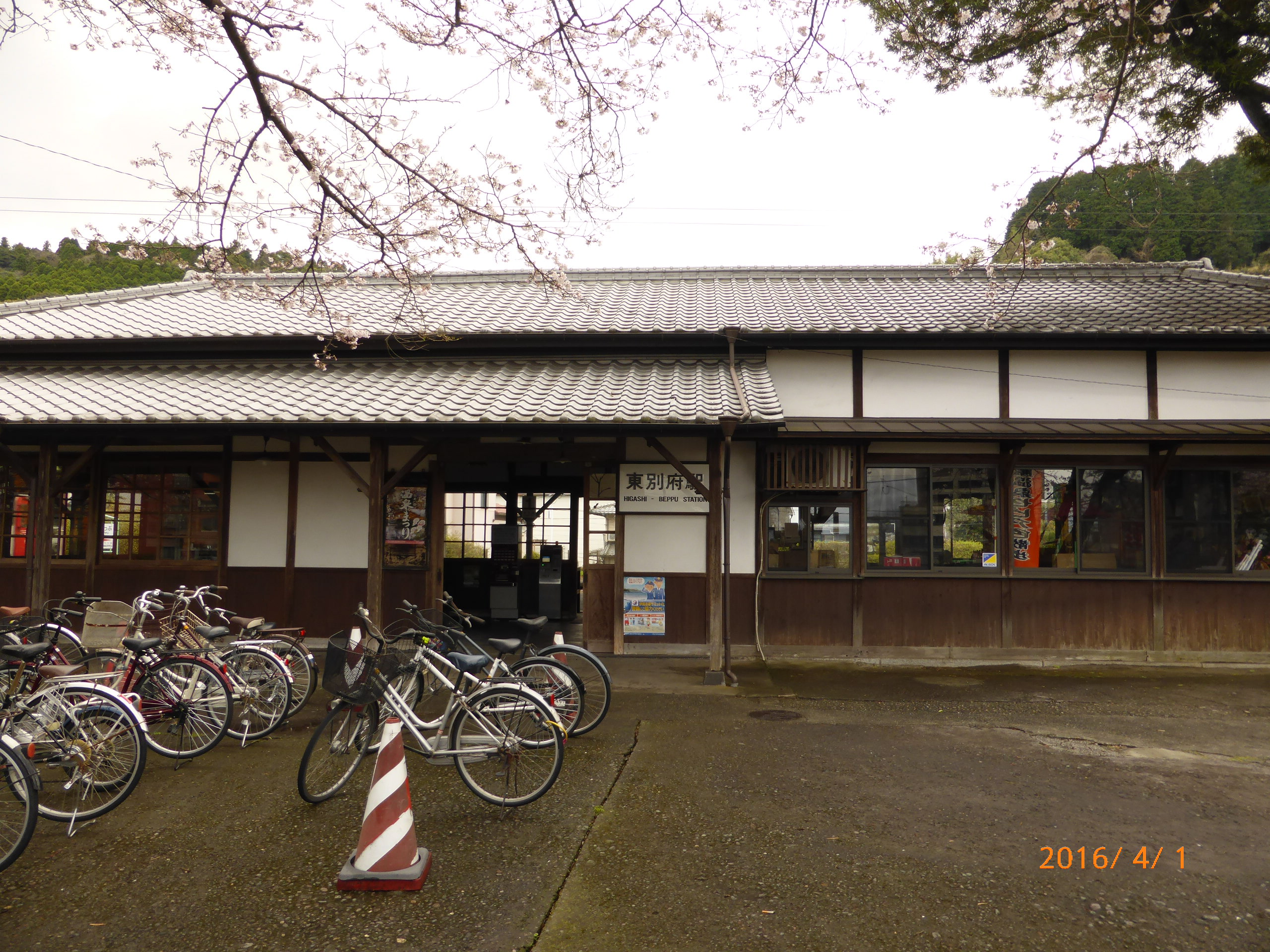
- Higashi-Beppu Station in April 2016

General information
- Location: 1-chōme-15 Hamawaki, Beppu-shi, Ōita-ken 874-0947; Japan
- Coordinates: 33°16′04″N 131°30′38″E
- Operator: JR Kyushu
- Line: ■ Nippō Main Line
- Distance: 122.8 km from Kokura
- Platforms: 2 side platforms
- Tracks: 2

Construction
- Structure type: At grade

Other information
- Status: Staffed ticket window (outsourced)
- Website: Official website

History
- Opened: 1 November 1911
- Former names: Hamawaki (until 15 April 1934)

Passengers
- FY2015: 255 daily

Services
Preceding station	JR Kyushu	Following station
Nishi-Ōita towards Kagoshima	Nippō Main Line	Beppu towards Kokura
Location
- Location within Oita Prefecture Location within Japan

Higashi-Beppu Station (東別府駅, Higashi-Beppu-eki) is a passenger railway station located in the city of Beppu, Ōita Prefecture, Japan. It is operated by JR Kyushu.

== Lines ==
The station is served by the Nippō Main Line and is located 122.8 km from the starting point of the line at Kokura.

== Layout ==
The station consists of two side platforms serving two tracks at grade. The station building is an original Meiji-period Japanese style wooden structure from the time the station was opened and it has been designated by Beppu City as a tangible cultural property. The station facilities include a waiting area and a staffed ticket window. Access to the opposite side platform is by means of a footbridge.

Management of the station has been outsourced to the JR Kyushu Tetsudou Eigyou Co., a wholly owned subsidiary of JR Kyushu specialising in station services. It staffs the ticket booth which is equipped with a POS machine but does not have a Midori no Madoguchi facility.

=== Platforms ===
1	■ ■ Nippō Main Line	for Ōita and Saiki
2	■ ■ Nippō Main Line	for Beppu and Kokura

== History ==
The private Kyushu Railway had, by 1909, through acquisition and its own expansion, established a track from Kokura to Yanagigaura. The Kyushu Railway was nationalised on 1 July 1907. Japanese Government Railways (JGR), designated the track as the Hōshū Main Line on 12 October 1909 and expanded it southwards in phases. Ōita opened as the new southern terminus on 1 November 1911 after the track was extended there from Beppu. On the same day, this station was opened as an intermediate station on the new track with the name of Hamawaki (浜脇). On 15 December 1923, the Hōshū Main Line was renamed the Nippō Main Line. On 15 April 1934, the station was renamed Higashi-Beppu. With the privatization of Japanese National Railways (JNR), the successor of JGR, on 1 April 1987, the station came under the control of JR Kyushu.

On 5 February 2005, the station building was designated as a tangible cultural property (i.e. given protected heritage status) by Beppu City.

== Passenger statistics ==
In fiscal 2015, there were a total of 93,088 boarding passengers, giving a daily average of 255 passengers.

== Surrounding area ==
- Beppu City Hamawaki Junior High School
- Japan National Route 10

== See also ==
- List of railway stations in Japan
