= Hiji Domain =

Administrative division in Japan during the Edo period (1601–1871)

Hiji Domain 日出藩
- Domain of Japan
- 1600–1871
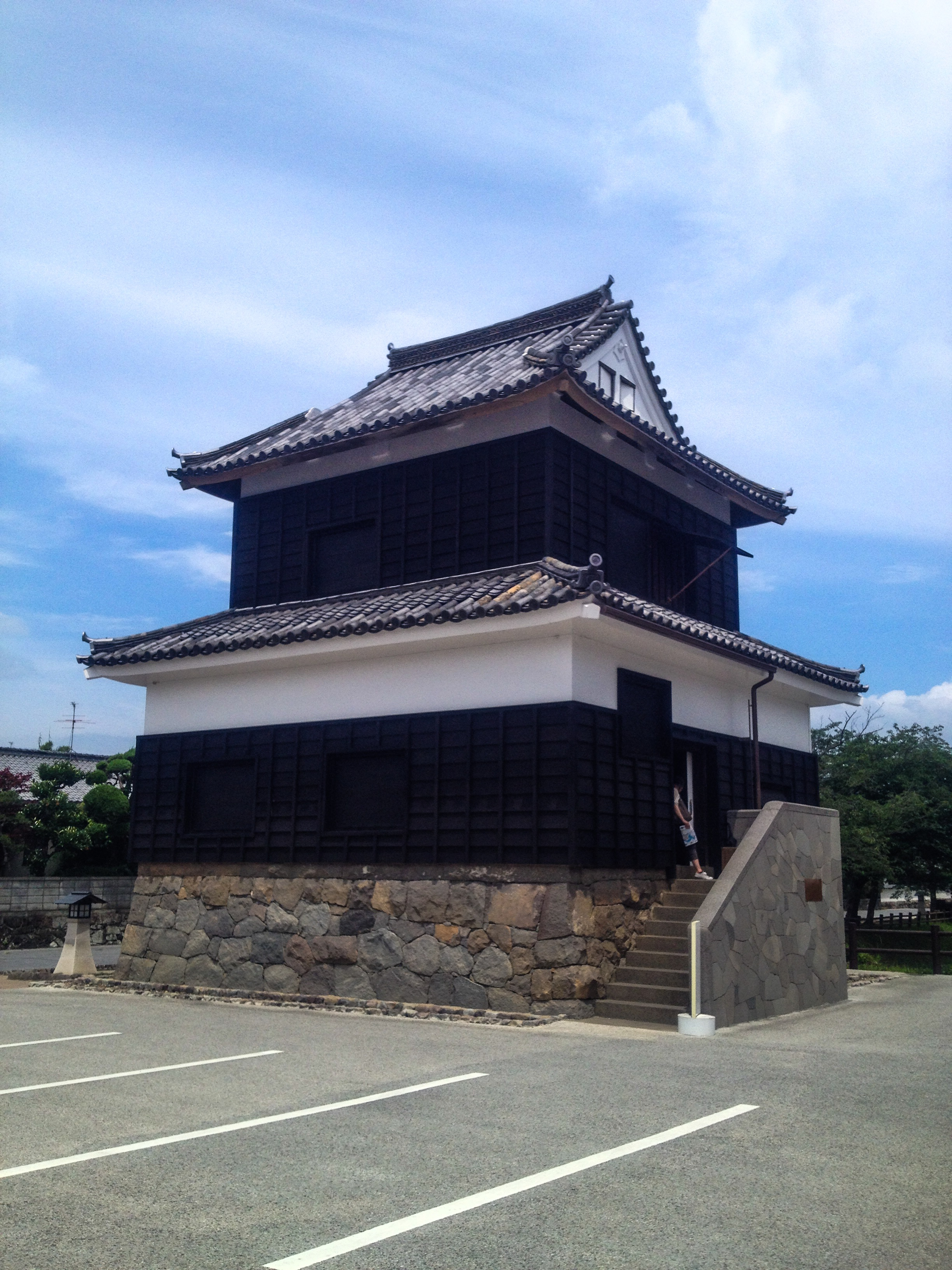
- Yagura of Hiji Castle

- Mon of the Kinoshita clan
- Capital: Hiji Castle
- Area
  - Coordinates: 33°22′0.26″N 131°31′54.14″E
- Historical era: Edo period
  - Established: 1600
  - Abolition of the han system: 1871
- Contained within
  - Province: Bungo Province
- Today part of: Oita Prefecture

Location of Hiji Castle
Hiji Domain (Japan)

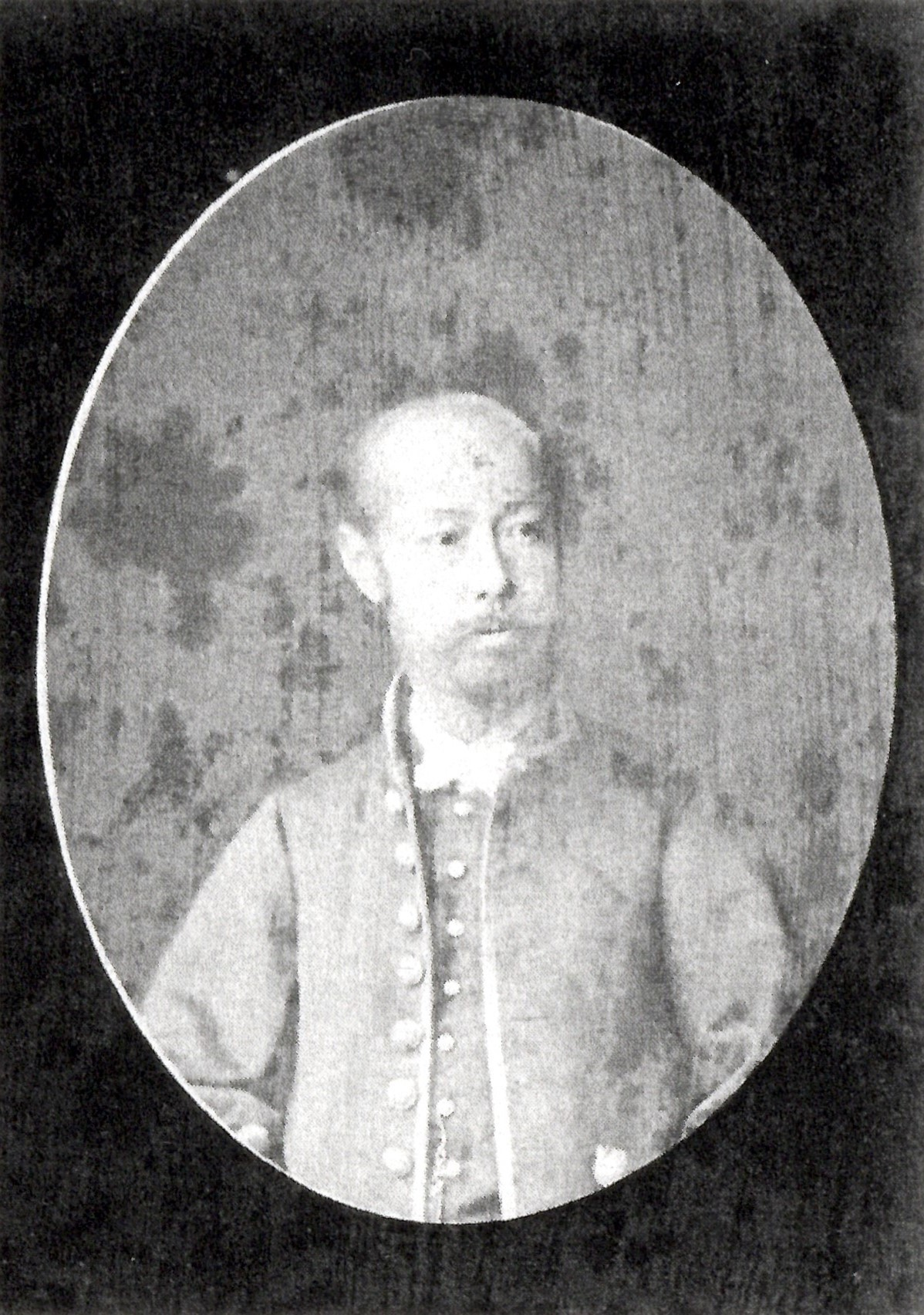
Kinoshita Toshimasa, final daimyō of Hiji Domain

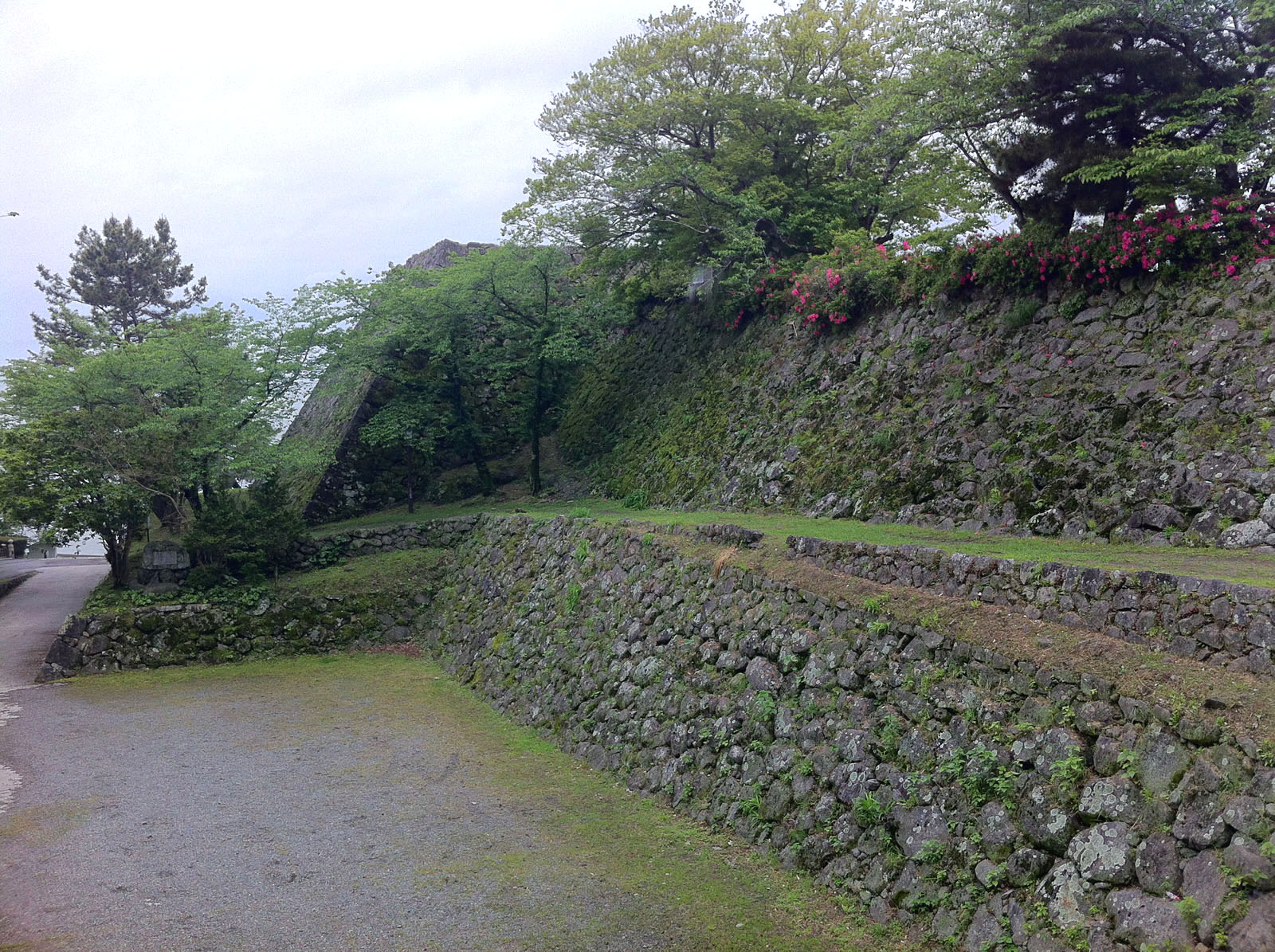
Stone walls of Hiji Castle

Hiji Domain (日出藩, Hiji-han) was a feudal domain under the Tokugawa shogunate of Edo period Japan, in what is now central Ōita Prefecture. It was centered around Hiji Castle in what is now the town of Hiji, Ōita and was ruled by the tozama daimyō Kinoshita clan for all of its history.

== History ==
Hiji Domain was founded by Kinoshita Nobutoshi, the third son of Kinoshita Iesada, the older brother of Toyotomi Hideyoshi's legal wife Kōdai-in (Nene). During the Battle of Sekigahara in 1600, Kinoshita Nobutoshi was active in the Eastern Army from the start of the campaign, and after the war, Tokugawa Ieyasu awarded him a domain with a kokudaka of 30,000 koku in Hayami District, Bungo Province. Furthermore, his father Iesada was also given a separate territory from Nobutoshi and established Ashimori Domain in Bitchū Province (25,000 koku). Furthermore, since the daimyō of Hiji and Ashimori clans were close relatives of Kōdai-in, they were allowed to continue to use the surname "Toyotomi" even after the defeat of the Toyotomi clan at the Siege of Osaka in 1615

Kinoshita Toshiharu, son of Nobutoshi and the second daimyō distributed a territory of 5,000 koku to his younger brother Nobuyoshi to establish a cadet branch of the clan, so the territory of Hiji Domain was reduced to 25,000 koku. Throughout the Edo period, the Kinoshita clan continued to rule Hiji for 16 generations, without any transfer or further reduction of territory. The domain was an early supporter of the imperial side in the Boshin War. Following the Meiji restoration in 1871, it became Hiji Prefecture due to the abolition of the han system, and was later incorporated into Ōita Prefecture. The Kinoshita clan was elevated to the kazoku peerage with the title of viscount in 1884.

== Holdings at the end of the Edo period ==
As with most domains in the han system, Hiji Domain consisted of several discontinuous territories calculated to provide the assigned kokudaka, based on periodic cadastral surveys and projected agricultural yields, g.

- Bungo Province
  - 18 villages in Hayami District

== List of daimyō ==
#	Name	Tenure	Courtesy title	Court Rank	kokudaka
Kinoshita clan, 1600–1871 (Tozama)
1	Kinoshita Nobutoshi (木下延俊)	1601–1642	Uemon-no-taifu (右衛門大夫)	Junior 5th Rank, Lower Grade (従五位下)	30,000 koku
2	Kinoshita Toshiharu (木下俊治)	1642–1661	Iga-no-kami (伊賀守)	Junior 5th Rank, Lower Grade (従五位下)	25,000 koku
3	Kinoshita Toshinaga (木下俊長)	1661–1707	Kura-no-kami (内蔵頭)	Junior 5th Rank, Lower Grade (従五位下)	27,000 koku
4	Kinoshita Toshikazu (木下俊量)	1707–1729	Iga-no-kami (伊賀守)	Junior 5th Rank, Lower Grade (従五位下)	27,000 koku
5	Kinoshita Toshiari (木下俊在)	1729–1731	Iga-no-kami (伊賀守)	Junior 5th Rank, Lower Grade (従五位下)	27,000 koku
6	Kinoshita Toshiyasu (木下俊保)	1731–1738	Izumi-no-kami (和泉守)	Junior 5th Rank, Lower Grade (従五位下)	27,000 koku
7	Kinoshita Toshiteru (木下俊監)	1741–1748	< unknown >	Junior 5th Rank, Lower Grade (従五位下)	27,000 koku
8	Kinoshita Toshiyoshi (木下俊能)	1741–1748	Shikibu-no-sho (式部少輔)	Junior 5th Rank, Lower Grade (従五位下)	27,000 koku
9	Kinoshita Toshiyasu (木下俊泰)	1748–1768	Yamato-no-kami (大和守)	Junior 5th Rank, Lower Grade (従五位下)	27,000 koku
10	Kinoshita Toshitane (木下俊胤)	1768–1776	Saimon-no-suke (左衛門佐)	Junior 5th Rank, Lower Grade (従五位下)	27,000 koku
11	Kinoshita Toshimasa (木下俊懋)	1776–1810	Kazue-no-kami (主計頭)	Junior 5th Rank, Lower Grade (従五位下)	27,000 koku
12	Kinoshita Toshiyoshi (木下俊良)	1810–1815	Sado-no-kami (佐渡守)	Junior 5th Rank, Lower Grade (従五位下)	27,000 koku
13	Kinoshita Toshiatsu (木下俊敦)	1815–1847	Yamato-no-kami (大和守)	Junior 5th Rank, Lower Grade (従五位下)	27,000 koku
14	Kinoshita Toshikata (木下俊方)	1847–1854	Kazue-no-kami (主計頭)	Junior 5th Rank, Lower Grade (従五位下)	27,000 koku
15	Kinoshita Toshinori (木下俊程)	1854–1867	Hida-no-kami (飛騨守)	Junior 5th Rank, Lower Grade (従五位下)	27,000 koku
16	Kinoshita toshimasa (木下俊愿)	1867–1871	Yamato-no-kami (大和守)	Junior 5th Rank, Lower Grade (従五位下)	27,000 koku

== See also ==
- List of Han
- Abolition of the han system
