= Hiji Castle =

Coordinates: 33°22′01″N 131°31′54″E

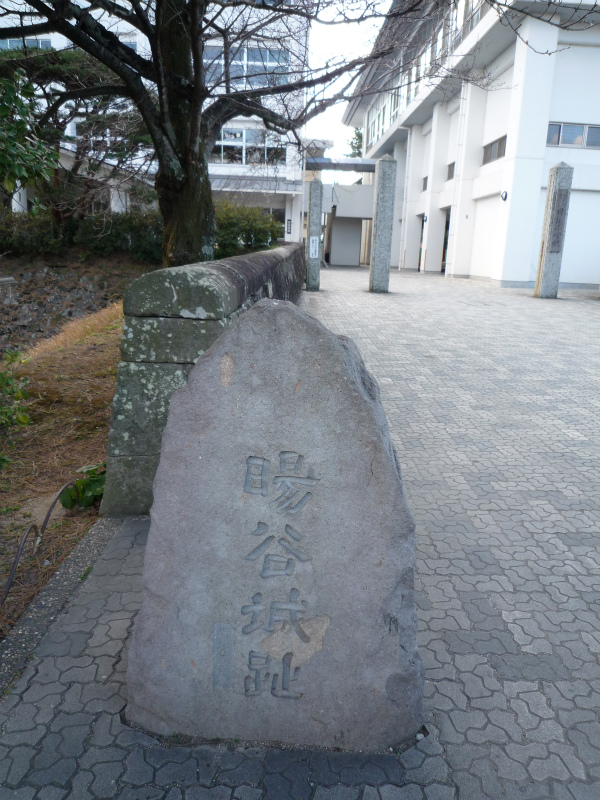
Monument marking the ruins of Hiji Castle. "Yōkoku Castle Ruins" (暘谷城趾) is written in kanji

Hiji Castle (日出城, Hiji-jō), also known as Yōkoku Castle, Aoyagi Castle, and Ukitsu Castle, was a castle located in Hiji, Ōita Prefecture, Japan. The construction of the castle began in 1601, under Kinoshita Nobutoshi's orders, when he was transferred to Hiji from Himeji. The castle was designed by Nobutoshi's brother-in-law, Hosokawa Tadaoki. It held a strategic location, as it overlooked Beppu Bay. The castle was destroyed after the Hiji Domain was abolished during the Meiji era. Today, the castle's ruins (all that remains are the stone walls and the Sumi yagura) are a park, though Hiji Elementary School is also located on the grounds.
