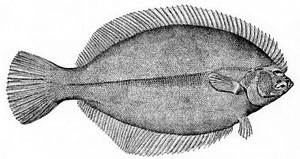

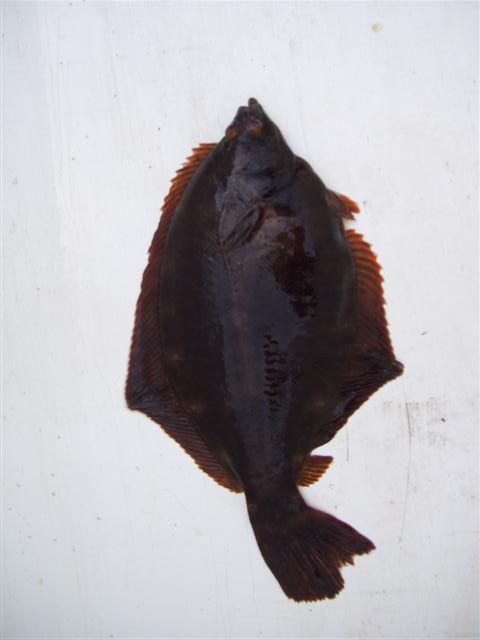

Conservation status
- Vulnerable (IUCN 3.1)

Scientific classification
- Kingdom: Animalia
- Phylum: Chordata
- Class: Actinopterygii
- Order: Carangiformes
- Suborder: Pleuronectoidei
- Family: Pleuronectidae
- Genus: Pseudopleuronectes
- Species: P. americanus

Binomial name
- Pseudopleuronectes americanus (Walbaum, 1792)

Synonyms
- Pleuronectes americanus Walbaum, 1792; Pleuronectes planus Mitchill, 1814; Platessa pusilla De Kay, 1842; Pseudopleuronectes dignabilis Kendall, 1912

= Winter flounder =

Species of fish

The winter flounder (Pseudopleuronectes americanus), also known as the black back, is a right-eyed ("dextral") flatfish of the family Pleuronectidae. It is native to coastal waters of the western north Atlantic coast, from Labrador, Canada to Georgia, United States, although it is less common south of Delaware Bay. It is the most common near-shore (shallow-water) flounder in the waters from Newfoundland down through Massachusetts Bay, reaching a maximum size around 61 cm in length and 2.25 kg in weight. The species grows larger on Georges Bank, where they can reach a length of 70 cm and weight of 3.6 kg. Although winter flounder historically supported large commercial and recreational fisheries, biomass and landings have decreased since the 1980s.

== Life cycle ==
Winter flounder lay up to 3.3 million demersal, adhesive eggs that are retained within their spawning grounds. Depending on temperature, larvae of approximately 3 mm in length hatch in two to three weeks. These larvae are planktonic at first, but transition to a bottom-oriented lifestyle over time. Around five to six weeks after hatching, the left eye of the larval flounder begins to migrate to the right side of the body. The "flounder-like" juveniles then settle onto the seafloor and move into saltwater coves, coastal salt ponds, estuaries, and protected bays, where they may grow up to 100 mm within the first year. Adult winter flounder may grow as large as 70 cm and reach ages of 15+ years. Growth varies across their distribution, with northern populations generally growing slower than those at the southern end of their range.

== Taxonomy ==
The winter flounder is one of five species in the genus Pseudopleuronectes along with the Yellow-striped flounder, Cresthead flounder, Marbled flounder, and Dark flounder. It is the only congener to inhabit the Atlantic Ocean.

Winter flounder can be differentiated from the commonly co-occurring summer flounder (Paralichthys dentatus) by their small teeth and eyes nearly always positioned on the right side of their bodies. Meanwhile, summer flounder have their eyes on the left side of their bodies and possess large, conspicuous teeth.

== Feeding and diet ==
Larval winter flounder are known to feed on nauplii, harpacticoids, calanoids, polychaetes, invertebrate eggs, and phytoplankton. As they grow, copepods, amphipods, and polychaetes all become more important elements of their diet. Adult winter flounder are opportunistic sight-feeders that target annelids, crustaceans, bivalves, and fish depending upon prey availability.

== Reproduction ==
Winter flounder reach sexual maturity at about two to three years of age and a total length of 25–30 cm, with variance across their range. Mature adults (excluding those on Georges Bank) generally migrate in two phases, where adults enter shallow estuaries in the late fall and early spring to spawn in late winter or early spring before returning to deeper parts of the estuary or offshore waters. However, these migration patterns may be altered or individuals may stay inshore year round if temperatures remain at 15 °C or lower or if enough food is available. Genetic analyses and tagging studies indicate that there is little mixing between the Winter flounder populations in the Gulf of Maine, South of Cape Cod, and on Georges Bank.

== Fisheries ==
Winter flounder are highly regarded for their delicious white meat and are sometimes called lemon sole in the U.S. They once supported large commercial and recreational fisheries, with peak harvests of 40.3 million pounds and 16.4 million pounds respectively. However, landings in both sectors have declined since the 1980s to 6 million pounds and 77,000 pounds respectively in 2013.

Winter flounder are managed as three stock units in U.S. coastal waters; Southern New England/Mid-Atlantic (SNE), Georges Bank (GB), and Gulf of Maine (GOM), where the status of each stock is as follows: SNE- overfished, overfishing is not occurring; GB- not overfished and overfishing is not occurring; GOM- unknown if they are overfished, overfishing is not occurring. Despite continued management efforts, habitat degradation, heavy fishing pressure, low genetic variability, and possibly climate change are combining to hinder the recovery of depleted Winter flounder populations.
