= Beppu Daigaku Station =

Railway station in Beppu, Ōita Prefecture, Japan

Beppu Daigaku Station 別府大学駅
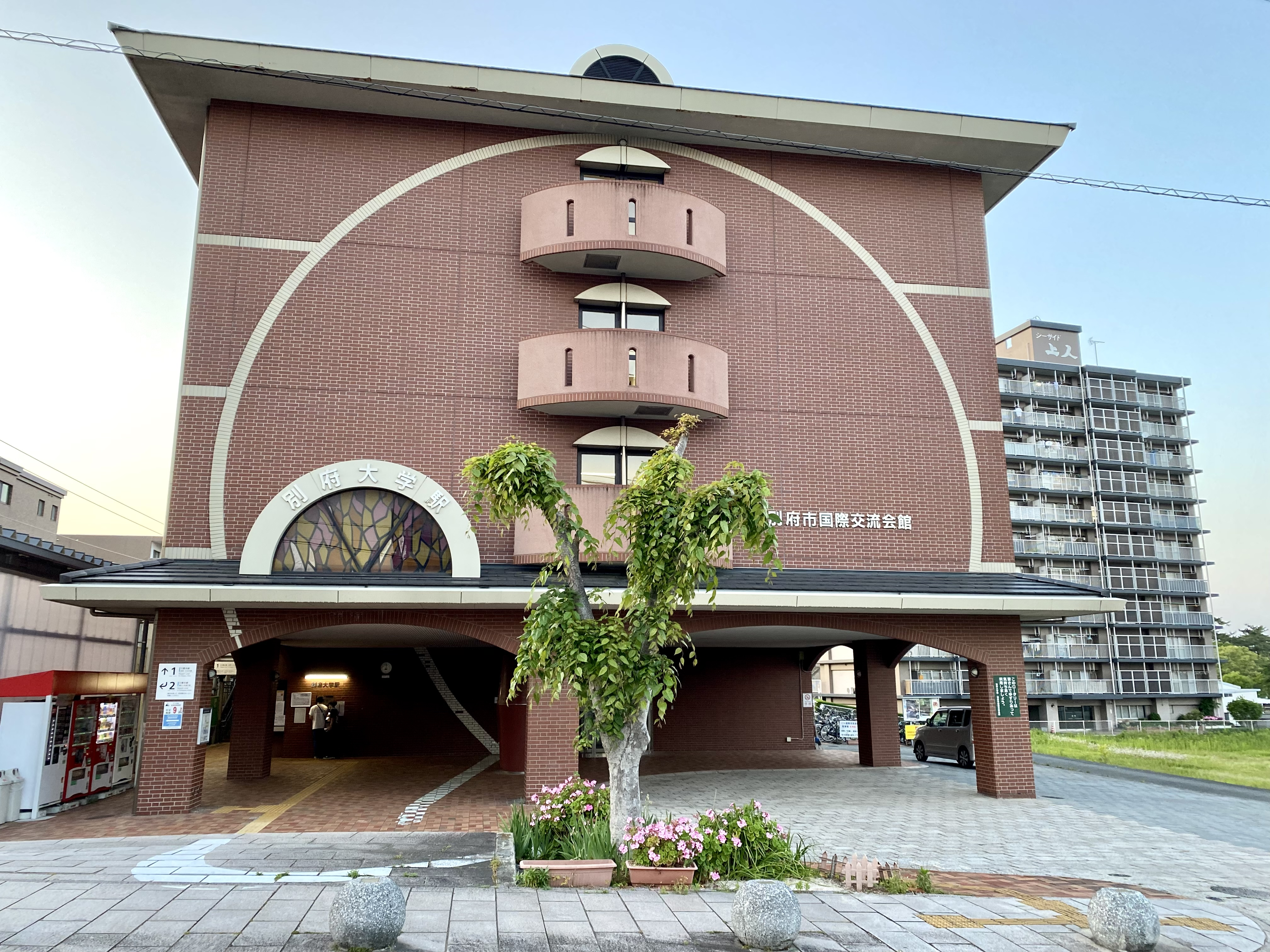
- Beppu Daigaku Station in May 2022

General information
- Location: 1 Shōninhonmachi, Beppu-shi, Ōita-ken 874-0032; Japan
- Coordinates: 33°18′47″N 131°29′58″E
- Operator: JR Kyushu
- Line: ■ Nippō Main Line
- Distance: 117.0 km from Kokura
- Platforms: 2 side platforms
- Tracks: 2

Construction
- Structure type: At grade

Other information
- Status: Staffed ticket window (outsourced)
- Website: Official website

History
- Opened: 9 March 1987

Passengers
- FY2016: 1,828 daily
- Rank: 101st (among JR Kyushu stations)

Services
Preceding station	JR Kyushu	Following station
Beppu towards Kagoshima	Nippō Main Line	Kamegawa towards Kokura
Location
- Location within Oita Prefecture Location within Japan

Beppu Daigaku Station (別府大学駅, Beppu-Daigaku-eki) is a passenger railway station located in the city of Beppu, Ōita Prefecture, Japan. It is operated by JR Kyushu.

== Lines ==
The station is served by the Nippō Main Line and is located 117.0 km from the starting point of the line at Kokura.

== Layout ==
The station consists of two side platforms serving two tracks at grade. There is no standalone station building. The ticket window is located on the ground floor of the Beppu City International Exchange Centre (別府市国際交流会館), a hostel with rooms to let. The platforms are linked by a footbridge.

Management of the station has been outsourced to the JR Kyushu Tetsudou Eigyou Co., a wholly owned subsidiary of JR Kyushu specialising in station services. It staffs the ticket booth which is equipped with a POS machine but does not have a Midori no Madoguchi facility.

=== Platforms ===
1	■ ■ Nippō Main Line	for Beppu and Ōita
2	■ ■ Nippō Main Line	for Nakatsu and Kokura

== History ==
Japanese National Railways (JNR) opened the station on 9 March 1987 as an additional station on the existing track of the Nippō Main Line. With the privatization of JNR on 1 April 1987, the station came under the control of JR Kyushu.

== Passenger statistics ==
In fiscal 2016, the station was used by an average of 1,828 passengers daily (boarding passengers only), and it ranked 101st among the busiest stations of JR Kyushu.

== Surrounding area ==
- Beppu University

== See also ==
- List of railway stations in Japan
