= Yellow striped flounder =

Scientific classification
- Domain: Eukaryota
- Kingdom: Animalia
- Phylum: Chordata
- Class: Actinopterygii
- Order: Carangiformes
- Suborder: Pleuronectoidei
- Family: Pleuronectidae
- Genus: Pseudopleuronectes
- Species: P. herzensteini

Binomial name
- Pseudopleuronectes herzensteini (Jordan & Snyder, 1901)

Synonyms
- Limanda herzensteini Jordan & Snyder, 1901; Pleuronectes herzensteini (Jordan & Snyder, 1901); Pleuronectes japonicus Herzenstein, 1890; Limanda angustirostris Jordan & Starks, 1906

Species of fish

The yellow striped flounder (also known as the littlemouth flounder), Pseudopleuronectes herzensteini, is a flatfish of the family Pleuronectidae. It is a demersal saltwater fish that occurs in the temperate waters of the northwestern Pacific, from the Sea of Japan to the Kuril Islands, Sakhalin, Korea, the Yellow Sea, Gulf of Bohai and the East China Sea. It can grow up to 50 centimetres (20 in) in length, though commonly it reaches around 28.5 centimetres (11.2 in); its maximum recorded weight is 1.3 kilograms (2.9 lb) and its maximum reported lifespan is 15 years.
