= Hiji =

Hiji 日出町
- Town
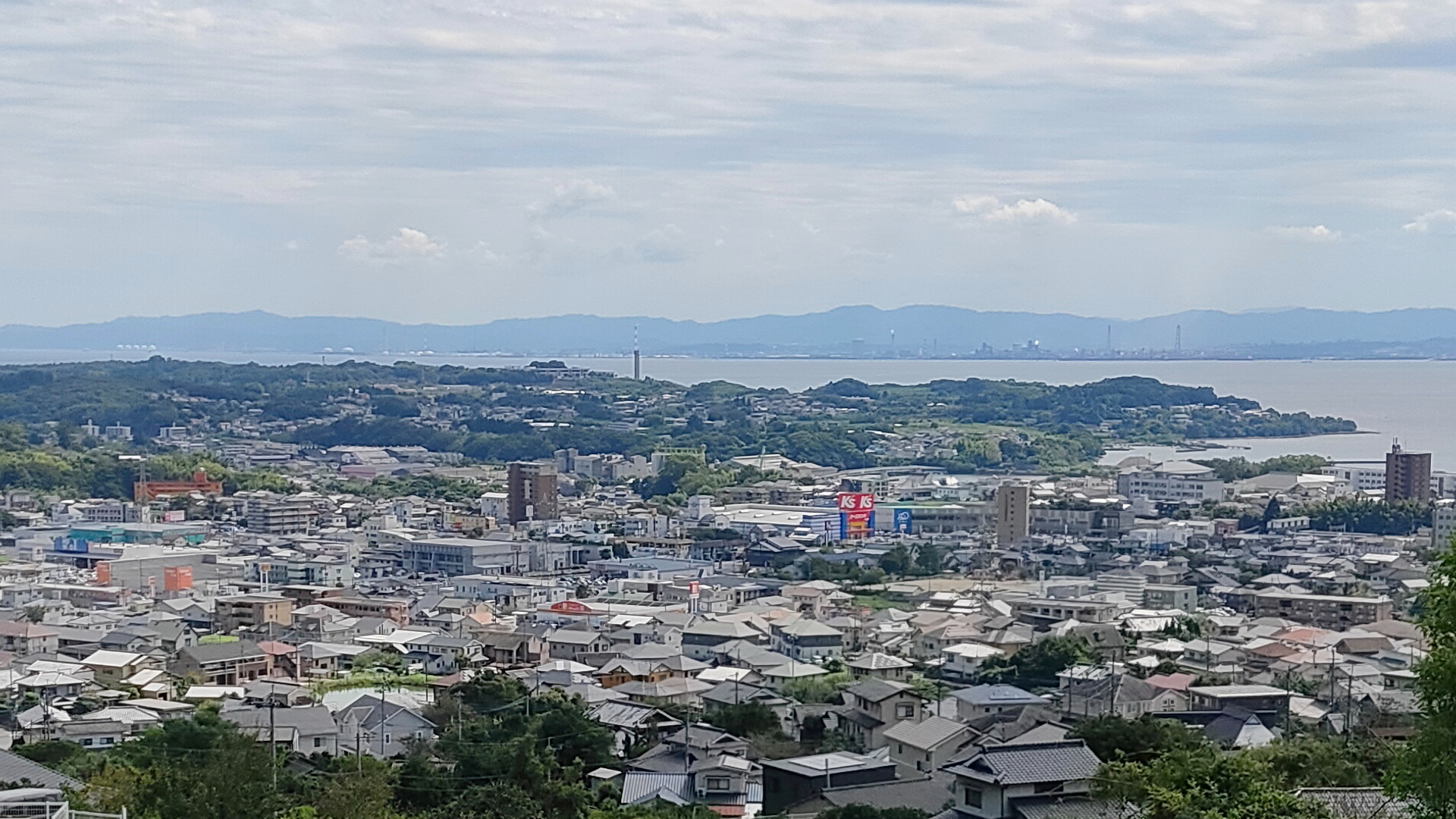
- Hiji Town Center

- Flag Emblem
- Interactive map of Hiji
- Location in Japan
- Coordinates: 33°22′10″N 131°31′56″E
- Country: Japan
- Region: Kyushu
- Prefecture: Ōita
- District: Hayami

Area
  - Total: 73.32 km^{2} (28.31 sq mi)

Population (November 30, 2023)
  - Total: 28,025
  - Density: 382.2/km^{2} (990.0/sq mi)
- Time zone: UTC+09:00 (JST)
- City hall address: 2974-1 Hijichō, Hayami-gun, Ōita-ken 879-1506
- Website: Official website
- Symbols
- Flower: Camellia sasanqua
- Tree: Camellia sasanqua

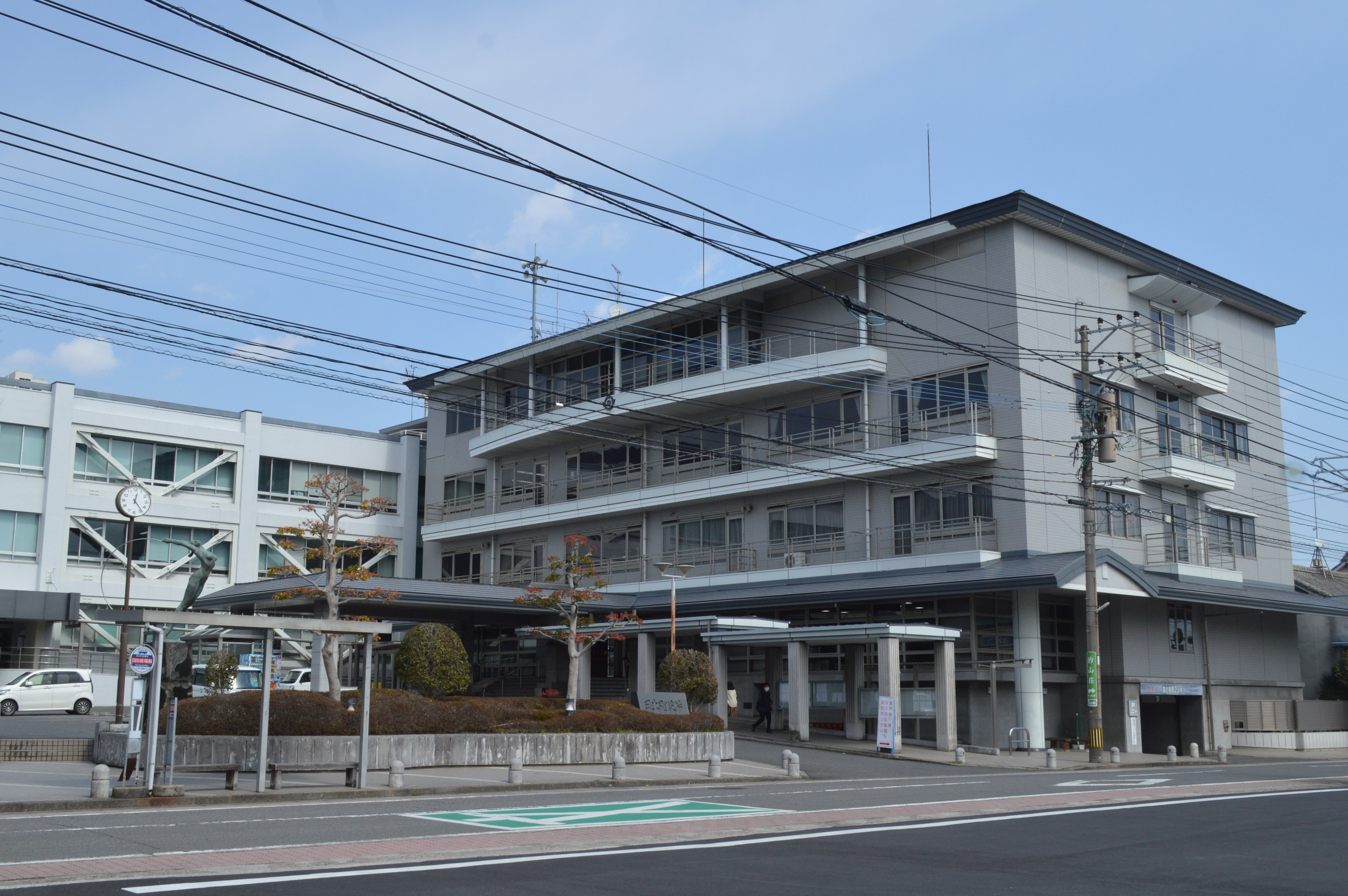
Hiji Town Hall

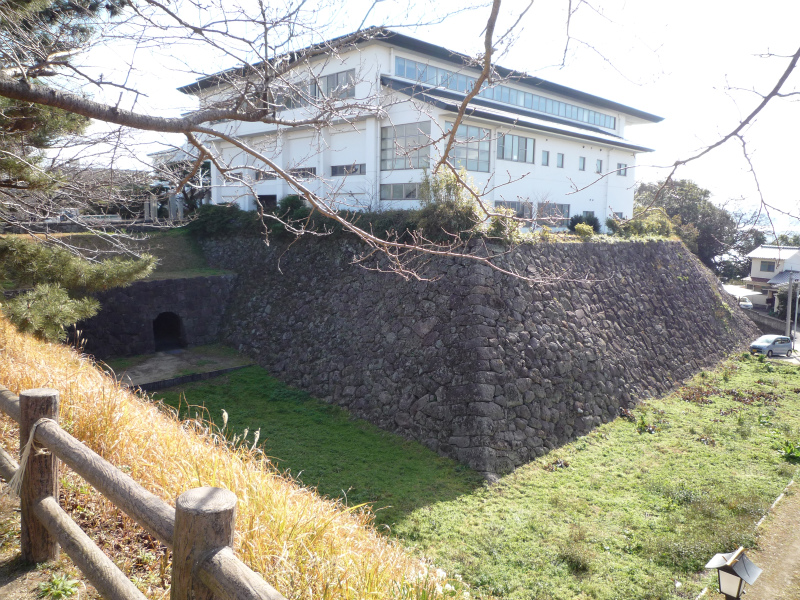
Hiji Castle ruins

Hiji (日出町, Hiji-machi) is a town located in Hayami District, Ōita Prefecture, Japan. As of 30 November 2023, the town had an estimated population of 28,025 in 12811 households, and a population density of 380 persons per km^{2}. The total area of the town is 73.32 km^{2} (28.31 sq mi).

== Geography ==
Hiji is located in central Ōita Prefecture, at the southern tip of the Kunisaki Peninsula, about 25 kilometers north of the prefectural capital at Ōita City. It occupies the northern shore of Beppu Bay.

=== Neighbouring municipalities ===
Ōita Prefecture

- Beppu
- Kitsuki
- Usa

=== Climate ===
Hiji has a humid subtropical climate (Köppen Cfa) characterized by warm summers and cool winters with light to no snowfall. The average annual temperature in Hiji is 16.0 °C. The average annual rainfall is 1623 mm with September as the wettest month. The temperatures are highest on average in August, at around 26.6 °C, and lowest in January, at around 5.6 °C.

=== Demographics ===
Per Japanese census data, the population of Hiji is as shown below

Historical population
Year	Pop.	±%
1960	21,494	—
1970	20,207	−6.0%
1980	21,464	+6.2%
1990	24,433	+13.8%
2000	27,640	+13.1%
2010	28,058	+1.5%
2020	27,723	—

== History ==
The area of Hiji was part of ancient Bungo Province. During the Edo period it was mostly under control of Hiji Domain and was ruled by the Kinoshita clan, relatives of Toyotomi Hideyoshi. The town of Hiji within Hayami District, Ōita was established on May 1, 1889, with the creation of the modern municipalities system. on March 31, 1954, Hiji expanded through a merger with the town of Toyooka and villages of Ogami, Kawasaki, and Fujiwara in Hayami District.

== Government ==
Hiji has a mayor-council form of government with a directly elected mayor and a unicameral town council of 16 members. Hiji contributes one member to the Ōita Prefectural Assembly. In terms of national politics, the town is part of the Ōita 3rd district of the lower house of the Diet of Japan.

== Economy ==
The economy of Hiji has traditionally been centered on agriculture and commercial fishing, with flounder from Beppu Bay a notable local speciality. The area has been designated as a new industrial urban development area in the Ōita area and as a technopolis in the northern Kunisaki area of the prefecture, and many companies are moving into the area. The population has increased significantly as a commuter town for Ōita City and Beppu City.

== Education ==
Hiji has five public elementary schools and two public junior high schools operated by the city government and one public high school operated by the Ōita Prefectural Board of Education. The prefecture operates one special education school for the handicapped.

== Transportation ==
=== Railways ===
JR Kyushu - Nippō Main Line

- Ōga - Hiji - Yōkoku - Bungo-Toyooka

=== Highways ===
- Ōita Expressway
- Higashikyushu Expressway
- National Route 10
- National Route 213
- National Route 500

== Places of interests ==
The town has a trappist monastery and is also the home of Sanrio's Harmonyland theme park.

== Noted people from Hiji ==
- Megumi Asaoka, singer, actress
