= Beppu Station =

Railway station in Beppu, Ōita Prefecture, Japan

Beppu Station 別府駅
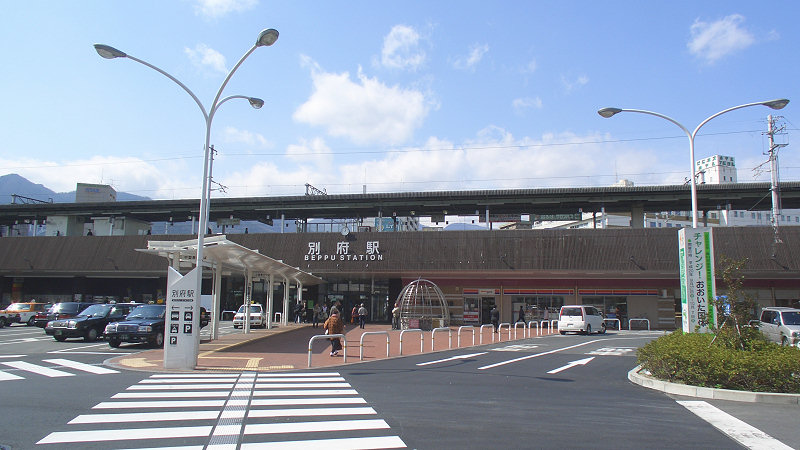
- Beppu Station in March 2007

General information
- Location: 12-13 Ekimaecho, Beppu-shi, Ōita-ken 874-0935; Japan
- Coordinates: 33.279541°N 131.500265°E
- Operator: JR Kyushu
- Line: ■ Nippō Main Line
- Distance: 120.8 km from Kokura
- Platforms: 2 side + 1 island platforms

Other information
- Status: Staffed (Midori no Madoguchi)
- Website: Official website

History
- Opened: 16 July 1911

Passengers
- FY2016: 5,933 daily
- Rank: 31st (among JR Kyushu stations)

Services
Preceding station	JR Kyushu	Following station
Higashi-Beppu towards Kagoshima	Nippō Main Line	Beppu Daigaku towards Kokura
Location
- Location within Oita Prefecture Location within Japan

Beppu Station (別府駅, Beppu-eki) is a passenger railway station located in the city of Beppu, Ōita Prefecture, Japan. It is operated by JR Kyushu.

== Lines ==
The station is served by the Nippō Main Line and is located 120.8 km from the starting point of the line at Kokura.

=== Limited Express Trains ===
- Sonic (Hakata - Ōita)
- Nichirin (Hakata - Miyazaki)
- Yufuin-no-mori, Yufu (Hakata - Beppu)
- Trans-Kyushu Limited Express (Beppu - Hitoyoshi)

== Layout ==
Beppu Station has two elevated island platforms and four tracks. In the past, two detention tracks were installed between the two island-style platforms, and were used to store trains arriving at and departing from this station. Now that the detention tracks have been removed, there is a large gap between the two platforms, Platforms 2 and 3. The station has a Midori no Madoguchi staffed ticket office.

=== Platforms ===
1	■ ■ Nippō Main Line	for Ōita, Saiki and Miyazaki Express trains
2	■ ■ Nippō Main Line	for Ōita, Saiki and Miyazaki Local trains
3	■ ■ Kyūdai Main Line	for Yufuin and Hita
3	■ ■ Hōhi Main Line	for Bungo-Taketa and Aso
3	■ ■ Nippō Main Line	for Nakatsu and Kokura local trains
4	■ ■ Nippō Main Line	for Nakatsu, Kokura Express trains

== History ==
The private Kyushu Railway had, by 1909, through acquisition and its own expansion, established a track from Kokura to Yanagigaura. The Kyushu Railway was nationalised on 1 July 1907. Japanese Government Railways (JGR), designated the track as the Hōshū Main Line on 12 October 1909 and expanded it southwards in phases, with Beppu opening as the new southern terminus on 16 July 1911. It became a through-station on 1 November 1911 when the track was extended further south to Ōita. On 15 December 1923, the Hōshū Main Line was renamed the Nippō Main Line. With the privatization of Japanese National Railways (JNR), the successor of JGR, on 1 April 1987, the station came under the control of JR Kyushu.

== Passenger statistics ==
In fiscal 2016, the station was used by an average of 5,933 passengers daily (boarding passengers only), and it ranked 31st among the busiest stations of JR Kyushu.

== Surrounding area ==
- Beppu Onsen
- Beppu City Hall

== See also ==
- List of railway stations in Japan
